= Pitcairnia inermis =

Scientific classification
- Kingdom: Plantae
- Clade: Tracheophytes
- Clade: Angiosperms
- Clade: Monocots
- Clade: Commelinids
- Order: Poales
- Family: Bromeliaceae
- Genus: Pitcairnia
- Species: P. inermis

Binomial name
- Pitcairnia inermis (Meyer in Presl) Meyer ex Schultes f.

Species of flowering plant

Pitcairnia inermis is a plant species in the genus Pitcairnia. This species is native to Bolivia.
