= Pitcairnia decidua =

Scientific classification
- Kingdom: Plantae
- Clade: Tracheophytes
- Clade: Angiosperms
- Clade: Monocots
- Clade: Commelinids
- Order: Poales
- Family: Bromeliaceae
- Genus: Pitcairnia
- Species: P. decidua

Binomial name
- Pitcairnia decidua L.B.Sm.

Species of flowering plant

Pitcairnia decidua is a plant species in the genus Pitcairnia. This species is endemic to Brazil.
