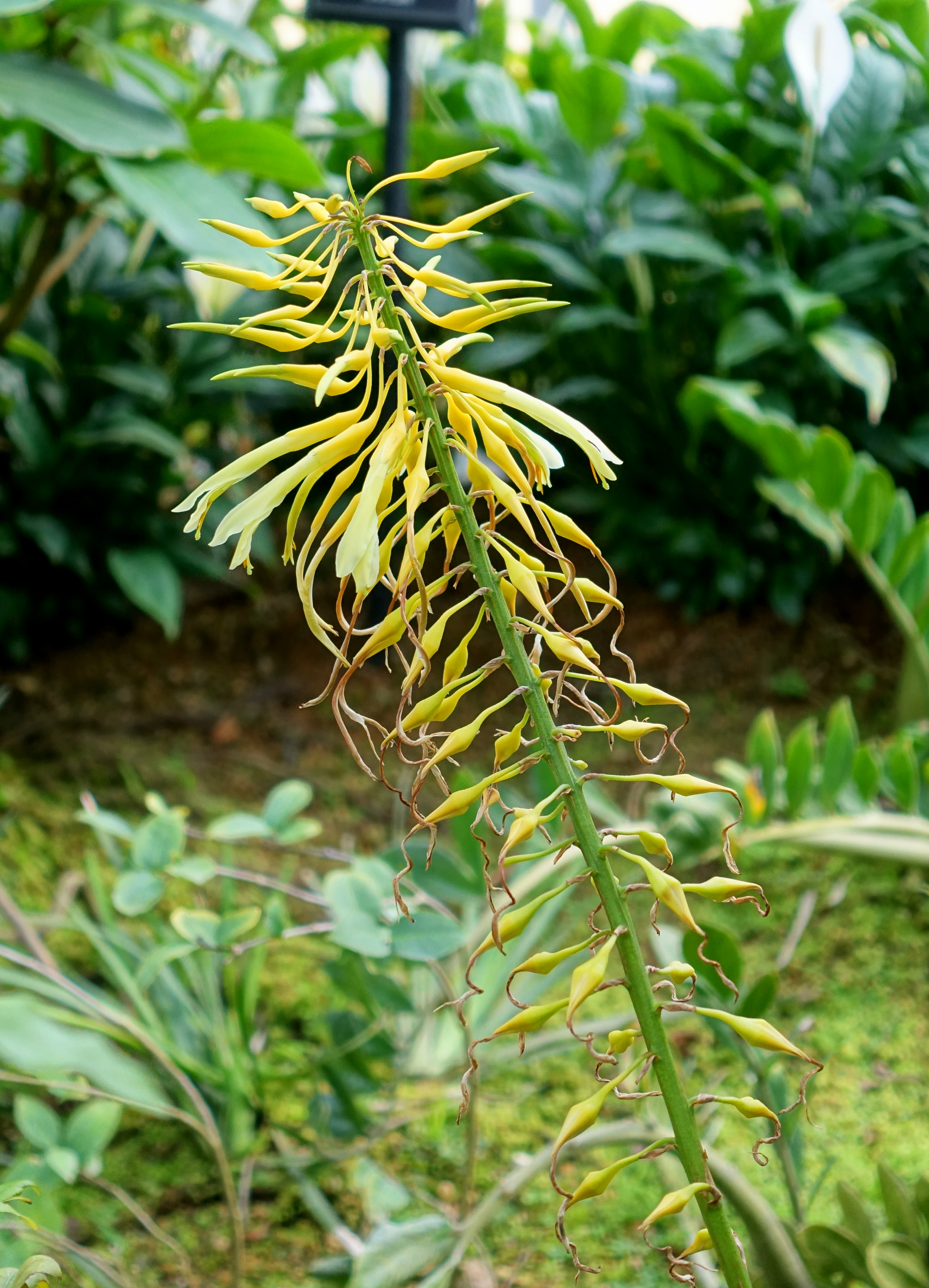
- The inflorescence from a Pitcairnia xanthocalyx

Scientific classification
- Kingdom: Plantae
- Clade: Tracheophytes
- Clade: Angiosperms
- Clade: Monocots
- Clade: Commelinids
- Order: Poales
- Family: Bromeliaceae
- Genus: Pitcairnia
- Species: P. xanthocalyx

Binomial name
- Pitcairnia xanthocalyx Martius

= Pitcairnia xanthocalyx =

Species of flowering plant

Pitcairnia xanthocalyx is a plant species in the genus Pitcairnia. This species is endemic to Mexico.

== Hybrids ==
- Pitcairnia 'Borincana' (Pitcairnia angustifolia X Pitcairnia xanthocalyx)
- Pitcairnia 'Mexican Blondes' (Pitcairnia chiapensis X Pitcairnia xanthocalyx)
- Pitcairnia 'Pinot Noir' (Pitcairnia rubronigriflora X Pitcairnia xanthocalyx)
