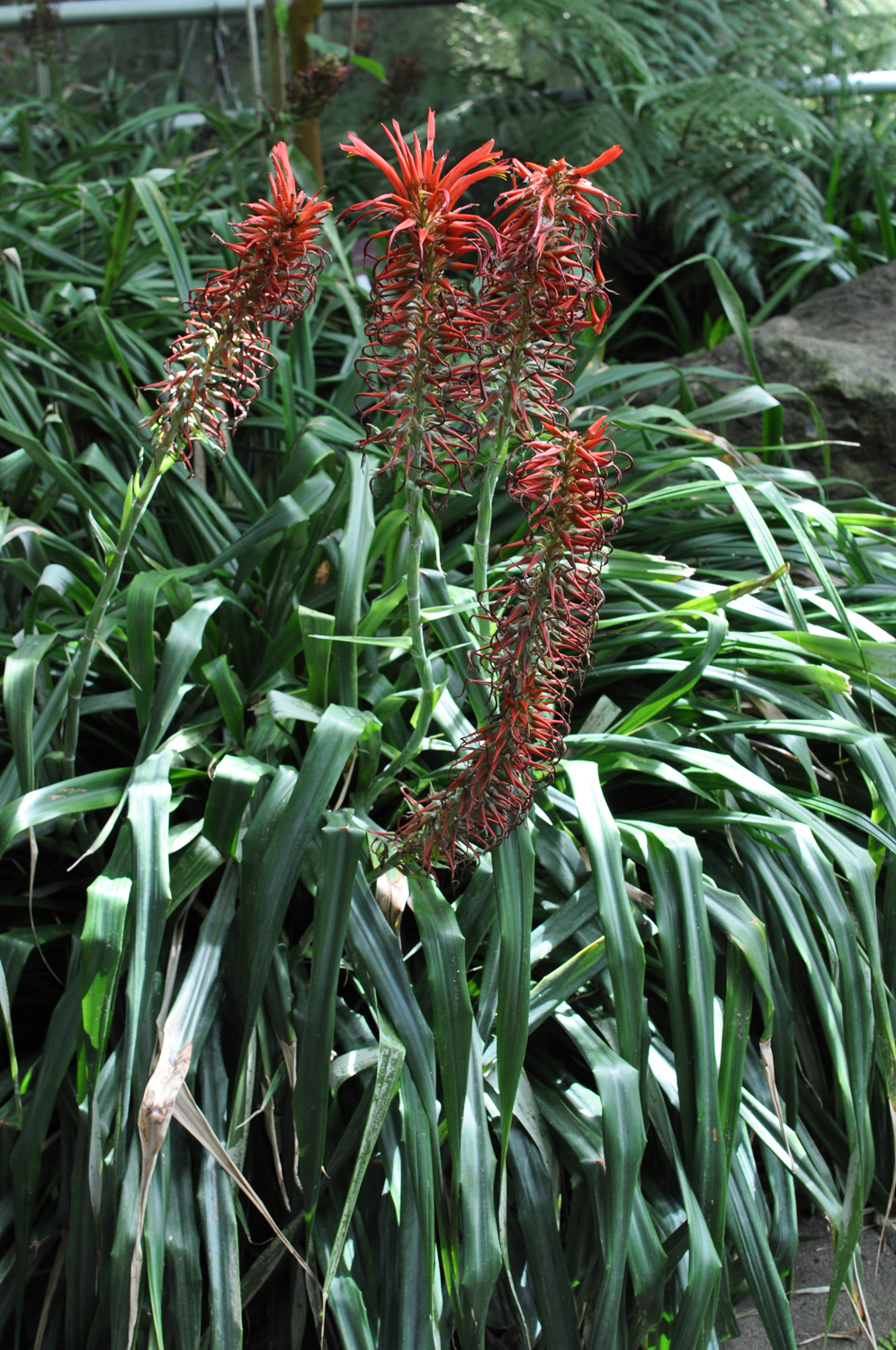

Scientific classification
- Kingdom: Plantae
- Clade: Tracheophytes
- Clade: Angiosperms
- Clade: Monocots
- Clade: Commelinids
- Order: Poales
- Family: Bromeliaceae
- Genus: Pitcairnia
- Species: P. spicata

Binomial name
- Pitcairnia spicata (Lamarck) Mez

Synonyms
- Bromelia spicata Lam.; Hepetis spicata (Lam.) Mez; Pitcairnia albucifolia Schrad.; Billbergia purpurea Beer; Pitcairnia affinis K.Koch; Hepetis albucifolia (Schrad.) Mez

= Pitcairnia spicata =

Species of flowering plant

Pitcairnia spicata is a plant species in the genus Pitcairnia. It is endemic to the Island of Martinique in the West Indies.

== Cultivars ==
- Pitcairnia 'Regia'
