= Pitcairnia multiramosa =

Scientific classification
- Kingdom: Plantae
- Clade: Embryophytes
- Clade: Tracheophytes
- Clade: Spermatophytes
- Clade: Angiosperms
- Clade: Monocots
- Clade: Commelinids
- Order: Poales
- Family: Bromeliaceae
- Genus: Pitcairnia
- Species: P. multiramosa

Binomial name
- Pitcairnia multiramosa (Mez) Mez

Synonyms
- Homotypic Synonyms: Hepetis multiramosa Mez

Species of flowering plant

Pitcairnia multiramosa is a species of flowering plant in the family Bromeliaceae. This species is endemic to Bolivia.
