= Pitcairnia lehmannii =

Scientific classification
- Kingdom: Plantae
- Clade: Tracheophytes
- Clade: Angiosperms
- Clade: Monocots
- Clade: Commelinids
- Order: Poales
- Family: Bromeliaceae
- Genus: Pitcairnia
- Species: P. lehmannii

Binomial name
- Pitcairnia lehmannii Baker

Synonyms
- Hepetis lehmannii (Baker) Mez; Pitcairnia auriculata Mez; Pitcairnia orgyalis Baker

Species of plant

Pitcairnia lehmannii is a species of flowering plant in the Bromeliaceae family. This species is native to Ecuador.
