= Pitcairnia brongniartiana =

Scientific classification
- Kingdom: Plantae
- Clade: Tracheophytes
- Clade: Angiosperms
- Clade: Monocots
- Clade: Commelinids
- Order: Poales
- Family: Bromeliaceae
- Genus: Pitcairnia
- Species: P. brongniartiana

Binomial name
- Pitcairnia brongniartiana André

Synonyms
- Hepetis brongniartiana (André) Mez; Hepetis klabochiana É.Morren ex Mez; Pitcairnia brongniartiana var. ornata Manzan. & W.Till; Pitcairnia brongniartiana var. variegata Manzan. & W.Till; Pitcairnia klabochiana (É.Morren ex Mez) Mez

Species of plant

Pitcairnia brongniartiana is a species of flowering plant in the Bromeliaceae family. It is native to Ecuador.

== Cultivars ==
- Pitcairnia 'Stardust'
