= Pitcairnia megasepala =

Scientific classification
- Kingdom: Plantae
- Clade: Tracheophytes
- Clade: Angiosperms
- Clade: Monocots
- Clade: Commelinids
- Order: Poales
- Family: Bromeliaceae
- Genus: Pitcairnia
- Species: P. megasepala

Binomial name
- Pitcairnia megasepala Baker

Synonyms
- Hepetis camptocalyx (André) Mez; Hepetis camptocalyx var. lutea (André) Mez; Hepetis camptocalyx var. robusta (André) Mez; Hepetis megasepala (Baker) Mez; Hepetis theae (Mez) Mez; Pitcairnia araneosa Baker; Pitcairnia camptocalyx André; Pitcairnia camptocalyx var. lutea André; Pitcairnia camptocalyx var. robusta André; Pitcairnia goudotiana André; Pitcairnia theae (Mez) Mez

Species of plant

Pitcairnia megasepala is a species of flowering plant in the Bromeliaceae family. This species is native to Costa Rica.
