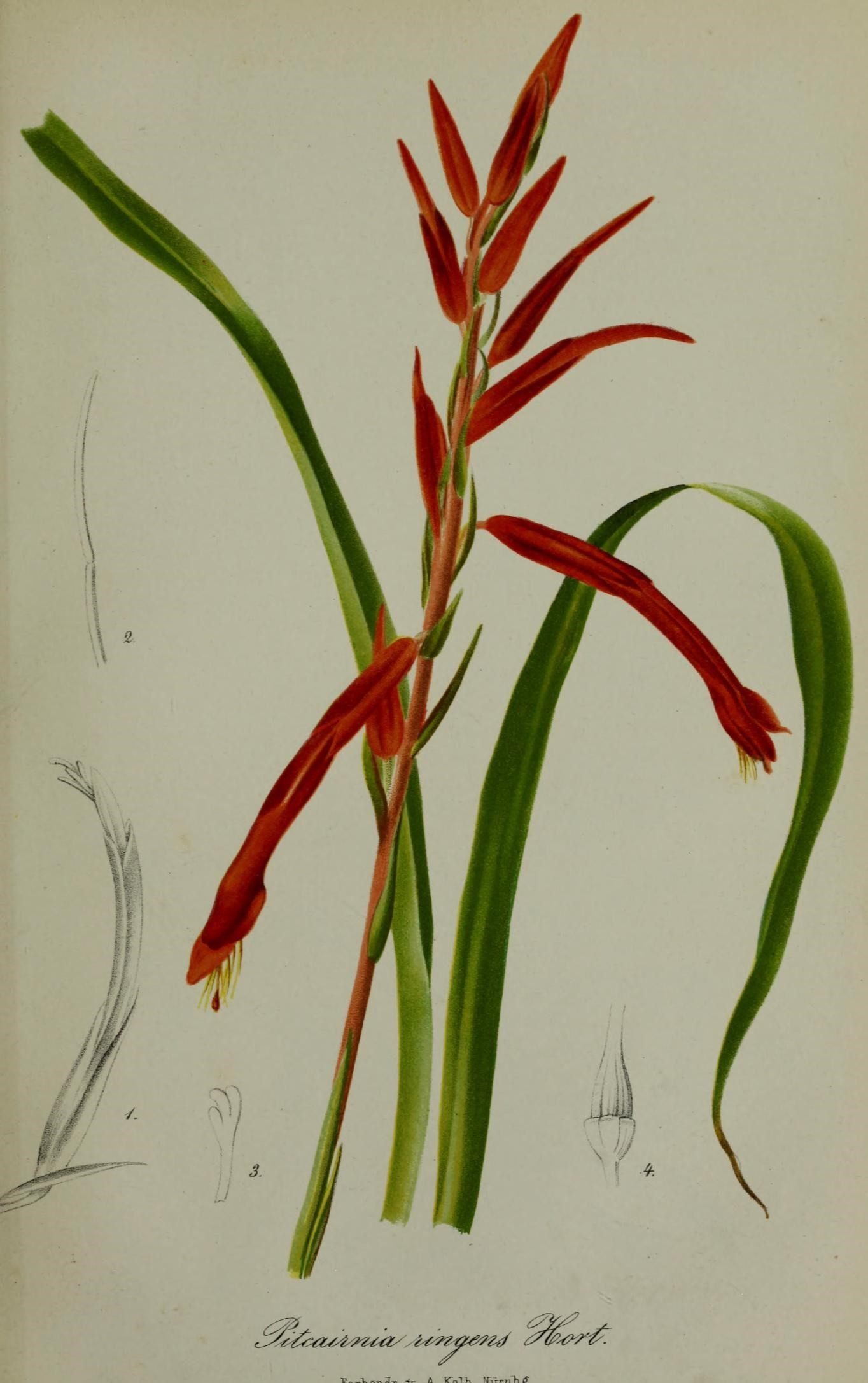

Scientific classification
- Kingdom: Plantae
- Clade: Tracheophytes
- Clade: Angiosperms
- Clade: Monocots
- Clade: Commelinids
- Order: Poales
- Family: Bromeliaceae
- Genus: Pitcairnia
- Species: P. ringens

Binomial name
- Pitcairnia ringens Klotzsch ex Link, Klotzsch & Otto

= Pitcairnia ringens =

Species of flowering plant

Pitcairnia ringens is a plant species in the genus Pitcairnia. This species is endemic to Mexico.
