= Pitcairnia brachysperma =

Scientific classification
- Kingdom: Plantae
- Clade: Tracheophytes
- Clade: Angiosperms
- Clade: Monocots
- Clade: Commelinids
- Order: Poales
- Family: Bromeliaceae
- Genus: Pitcairnia
- Species: P. brachysperma

Binomial name
- Pitcairnia brachysperma André

Synonyms
- Hepetis brachysperma (André) Mez

Species of plant

Pitcairnia brachysperma is a flowering plant in the Bromeliaceae family. It is native to Ecuador.
