= Pitcairnia curvidens =

Scientific classification
- Kingdom: Plantae
- Clade: Tracheophytes
- Clade: Angiosperms
- Clade: Monocots
- Clade: Commelinids
- Order: Poales
- Family: Bromeliaceae
- Genus: Pitcairnia
- Species: P. curvidens

Binomial name
- Pitcairnia curvidens L.B. Smith & R.W. Read

Species of flowering plant

Pitcairnia curvidens is a plant species in the genus Pitcairnia. This species is native to Brazil.
