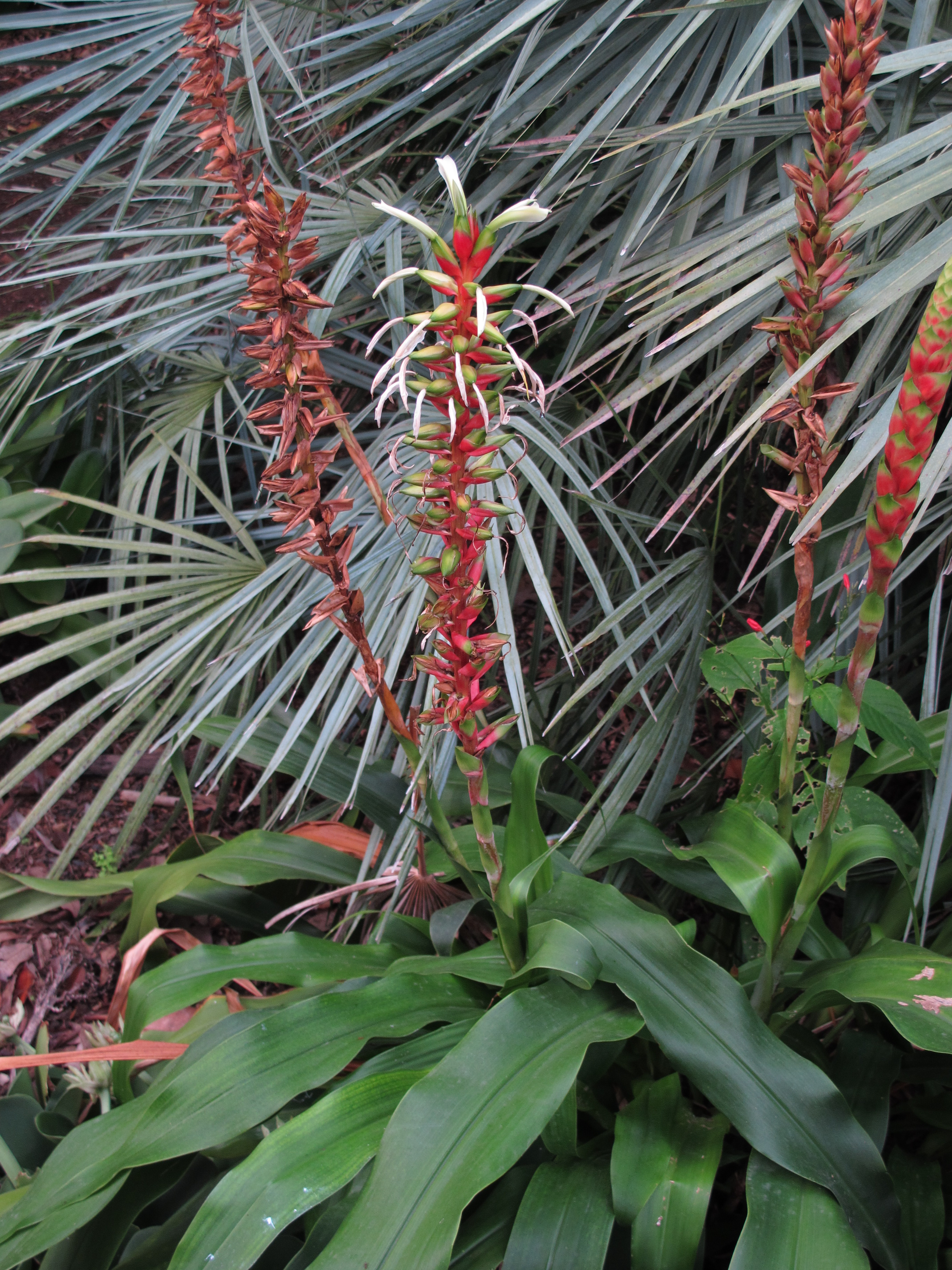

Scientific classification
- Kingdom: Plantae
- Clade: Tracheophytes
- Clade: Angiosperms
- Clade: Monocots
- Clade: Commelinids
- Order: Poales
- Family: Bromeliaceae
- Genus: Pitcairnia
- Species: P. maidifolia

Binomial name
- Pitcairnia maidifolia (C. Morren) Decaisne

Synonyms
- Puya maidifolia C.Morren; Neumannia maidifolia (C.Morren) K.Koch; Lamproconus maidifolia (C.Morren) Jacob-Makoy; Hepetis maidifolia (C.Morren) Mez; Pitcairnia funckiana A.Dietr.; Pitcairnia macrocalyx Hook.; Pitcairnia zeifolia K.Koch; Phlomostachys funckiana (A.Dietr.) Beer; Hepetis funckiana (A.Dietr.) Mez; Hepetis oerstediana Mez; Pitcairnia oerstediana (Mez) Mez

= Pitcairnia maidifolia =

Species of flowering plant

Pitcairnia maidifolia is a plant species in the genus Pitcairnia. This species is native to Central America (Honduras, El Salvador, Nicaragua, Panama, Costa Rica) and northern South America (Guyana, Suriname, Venezuela, Colombia and Ecuador).

== Cultivars ==
- Pitcairnia 'Jim Scrivner'
- Pitcairnia 'Stardust'
- Pitcairnia 'Verdia Lowe'
