= Pitcairnia trianae =

Scientific classification
- Kingdom: Plantae
- Clade: Tracheophytes
- Clade: Angiosperms
- Clade: Monocots
- Clade: Commelinids
- Order: Poales
- Family: Bromeliaceae
- Genus: Pitcairnia
- Species: P. trianae

Binomial name
- Pitcairnia trianae André

Synonyms
- Hepetis trianae (André) Mez

Species of plant

Pitcairnia trianae is a species of flowering plant in the Bromeliaceae family. It is native to Bolivia and Ecuador.
