= Pitcairnia recurvata =

Scientific classification
- Kingdom: Plantae
- Clade: Embryophytes
- Clade: Tracheophytes
- Clade: Spermatophytes
- Clade: Angiosperms
- Clade: Monocots
- Clade: Commelinids
- Order: Poales
- Family: Bromeliaceae
- Genus: Pitcairnia
- Species: P. recurvata

Binomial name
- Pitcairnia recurvata (Scheidweiler) K. Koch

Species of flowering plant

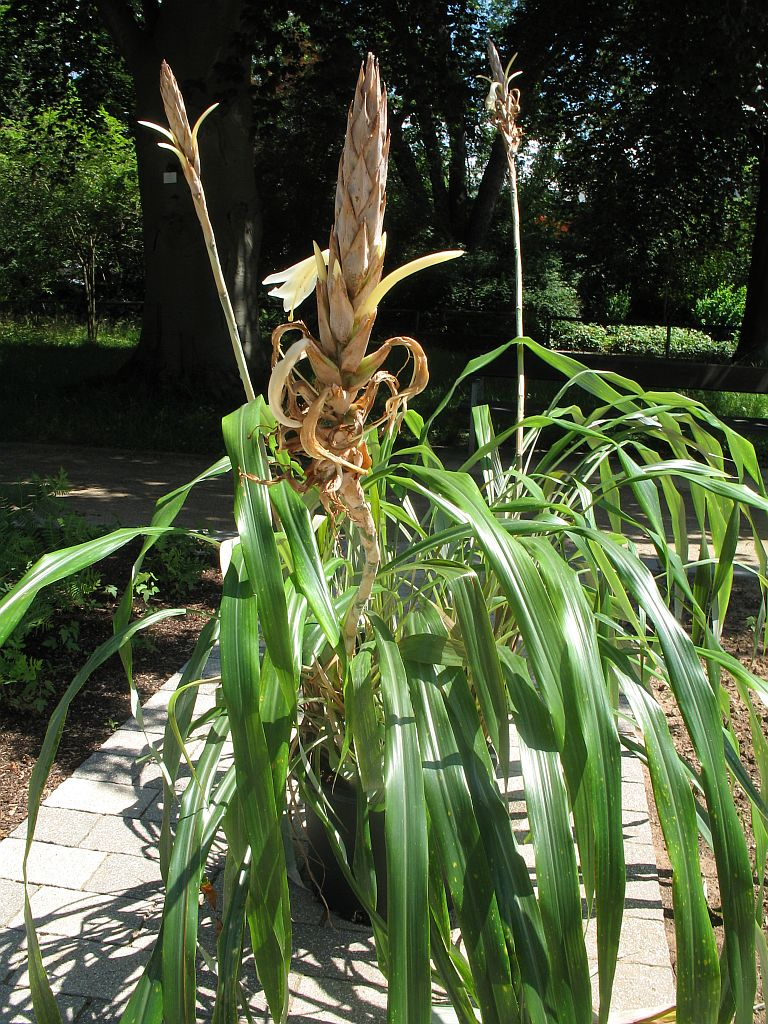

Pitcairnia recurvata is a plant species in the genus Pitcairnia. This species is native to Mexico.
