= Pitcairnia samuelssonii =

Scientific classification
- Kingdom: Plantae
- Clade: Tracheophytes
- Clade: Angiosperms
- Clade: Monocots
- Clade: Commelinids
- Order: Poales
- Family: Bromeliaceae
- Genus: Pitcairnia
- Species: P. samuelssonii

Binomial name
- Pitcairnia samuelssonii L.B.Sm.

Species of flowering plant

Pitcairnia samuelssonii is a plant species in the genus Pitcairnia.

== Cultivars ==
- Pitcairnia 'Hondo Valle'
