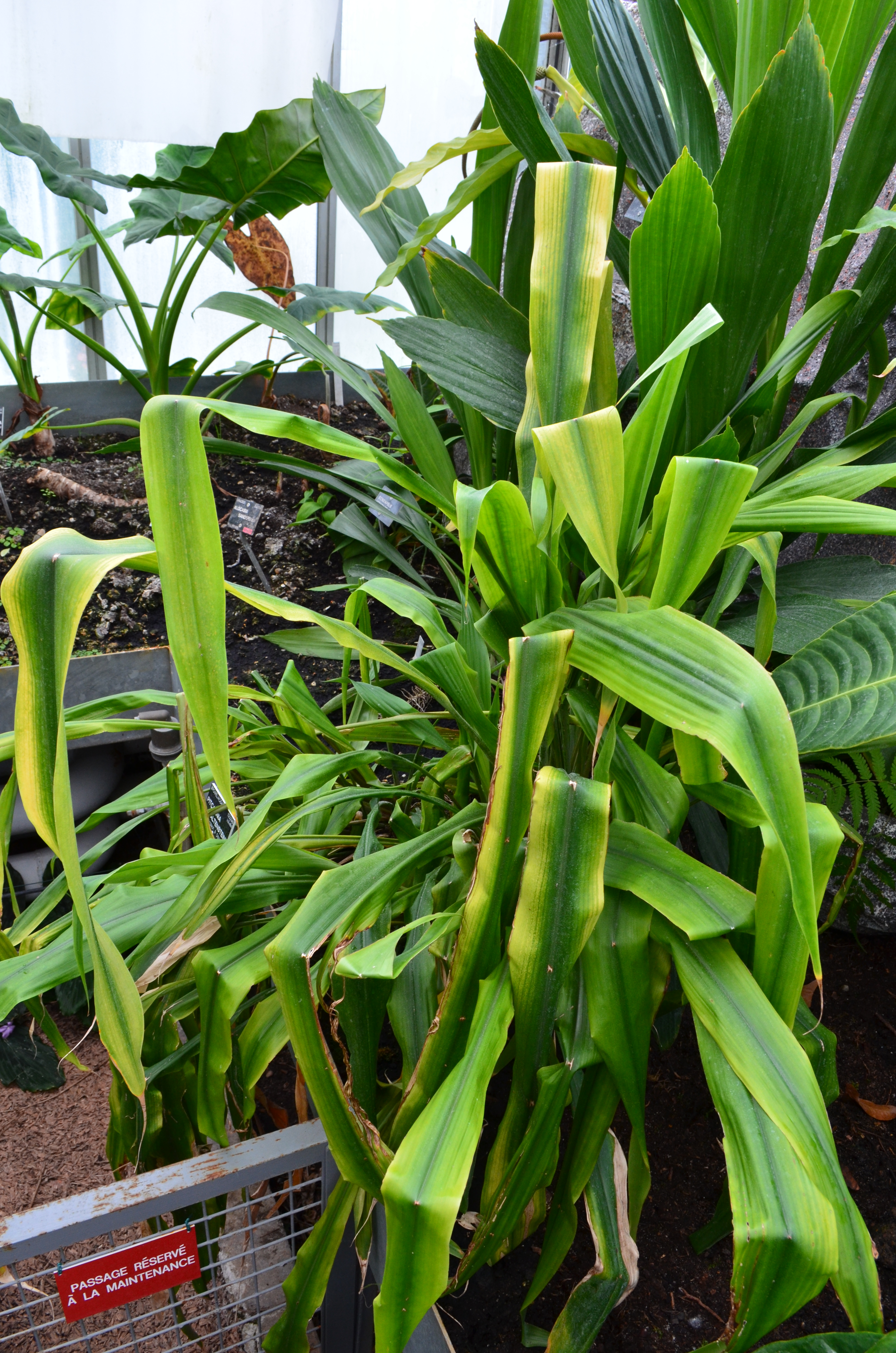

Scientific classification
- Kingdom: Plantae
- Clade: Tracheophytes
- Clade: Angiosperms
- Clade: Monocots
- Clade: Commelinids
- Order: Poales
- Family: Bromeliaceae
- Genus: Pitcairnia
- Species: P. altensteinii

Binomial name
- Pitcairnia altensteinii (Link, Klotzsch & Otto) Lemaire

= Pitcairnia altensteinii =

Species of flowering plant

Pitcairnia altensteinii is a plant species in the genus Pitcairnia. This species is endemic to Venezuela.

== Cultivars ==
- Pitcairnia 'Maroni'
