= Pitcairnia kalbreyeri =

Scientific classification
- Kingdom: Plantae
- Clade: Tracheophytes
- Clade: Angiosperms
- Clade: Monocots
- Clade: Commelinids
- Order: Poales
- Family: Bromeliaceae
- Genus: Pitcairnia
- Species: P. kalbreyeri

Binomial name
- Pitcairnia kalbreyeri Baker

Synonyms
- Hepetis kalbreyeri (Baker) Mez

Species of plant

Pitcairnia kalbreyeri is a species of flowering plant in the Bromeliaceae family. This species is native to Costa Rica.
