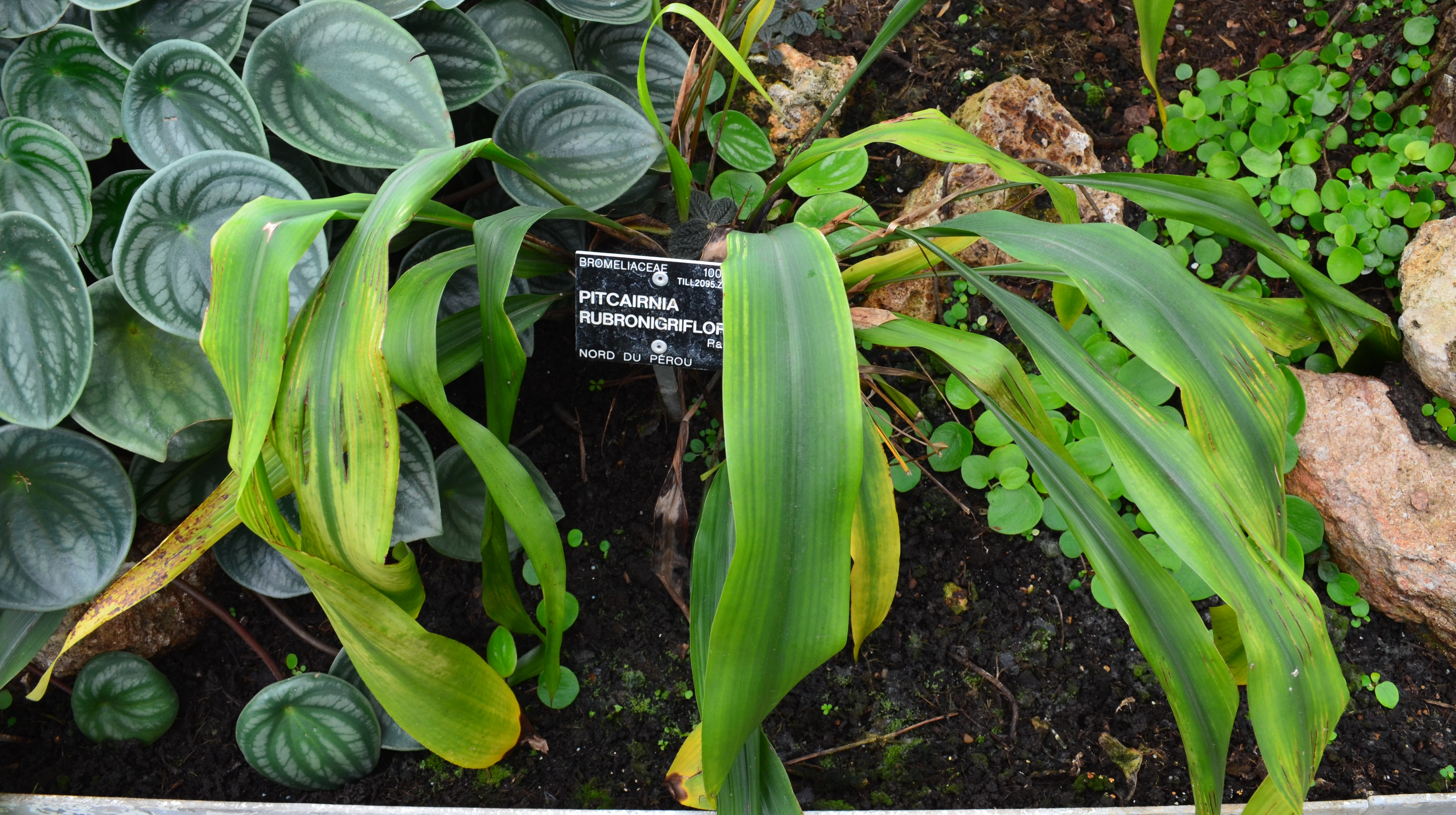

Scientific classification
- Kingdom: Plantae
- Clade: Tracheophytes
- Clade: Angiosperms
- Clade: Monocots
- Clade: Commelinids
- Order: Poales
- Family: Bromeliaceae
- Genus: Pitcairnia
- Species: P. rubronigriflora

Binomial name
- Pitcairnia rubronigriflora Rauh

= Pitcairnia rubronigriflora =

Species of flowering plant

Pitcairnia rubronigriflora is a plant species in the genus Pitcairnia.

== Cultivars ==
- Pitcairnia 'Beaujolais'
- Pitcairnia 'Coral Horizon'
- Pitcairnia 'Pinot Noir'
