= Pitcairnia longissimiflora =

Scientific classification
- Kingdom: Plantae
- Clade: Tracheophytes
- Clade: Angiosperms
- Clade: Monocots
- Clade: Commelinids
- Order: Poales
- Family: Bromeliaceae
- Genus: Pitcairnia
- Species: P. longissimiflora

Binomial name
- Pitcairnia longissimiflora Ibisch, Vásquez & Gross 1999

Species of flowering plant

Pitcairnia longissimiflora is a species of plant in the genus Pitcairnia that is endemic to Bolivia. It may reach heights of up to 140 centimetres (4.6 feet) and has an erect stem. Its dangling flowers of 16 cm (0.52 ft) consist of white or pale green petals.
