= Pitcairnia platystemon =

Conservation status
- Vulnerable (IUCN 3.1)

Scientific classification
- Kingdom: Plantae
- Clade: Embryophytes
- Clade: Tracheophytes
- Clade: Spermatophytes
- Clade: Angiosperms
- Clade: Monocots
- Clade: Commelinids
- Order: Poales
- Family: Bromeliaceae
- Genus: Pitcairnia
- Species: P. platystemon

Binomial name
- Pitcairnia platystemon (Mez) Mez

Synonyms
- Homotypic Synonyms: Hepetis platystemon Mez

Species of flowering plant

Pitcairnia platystemon is a species of flowering plant in the family Bromeliaceae. This species is endemic to Bolivia.
