= Pitcairnia albifolia =

Scientific classification
- Kingdom: Plantae
- Clade: Embryophytes
- Clade: Tracheophytes
- Clade: Spermatophytes
- Clade: Angiosperms
- Clade: Monocots
- Clade: Commelinids
- Order: Poales
- Family: Bromeliaceae
- Genus: Pitcairnia
- Species: P. albifolia

Binomial name
- Pitcairnia albifolia Cáceres Gonz. & A.Ibáñez

Species of flowering plant

Pitcairnia albifolia is a species of bromeliad in the family Bromeliaceae. This species is endemic to Panama. Generally, it can be found in the wet tropical biome. It was first described in 2014.
