= Pitcairnia phelpsiae =

Scientific classification
- Kingdom: Plantae
- Clade: Tracheophytes
- Clade: Angiosperms
- Clade: Monocots
- Clade: Commelinids
- Order: Poales
- Family: Bromeliaceae
- Genus: Pitcairnia
- Species: P. phelpsiae

Binomial name
- Pitcairnia phelpsiae (L.B. Smith) B. Holst & L.B. Smith

Species of flowering plant

Pitcairnia phelpsiae is a plant species in the genus Pitcairnia. This species is endemic to Venezuela.
