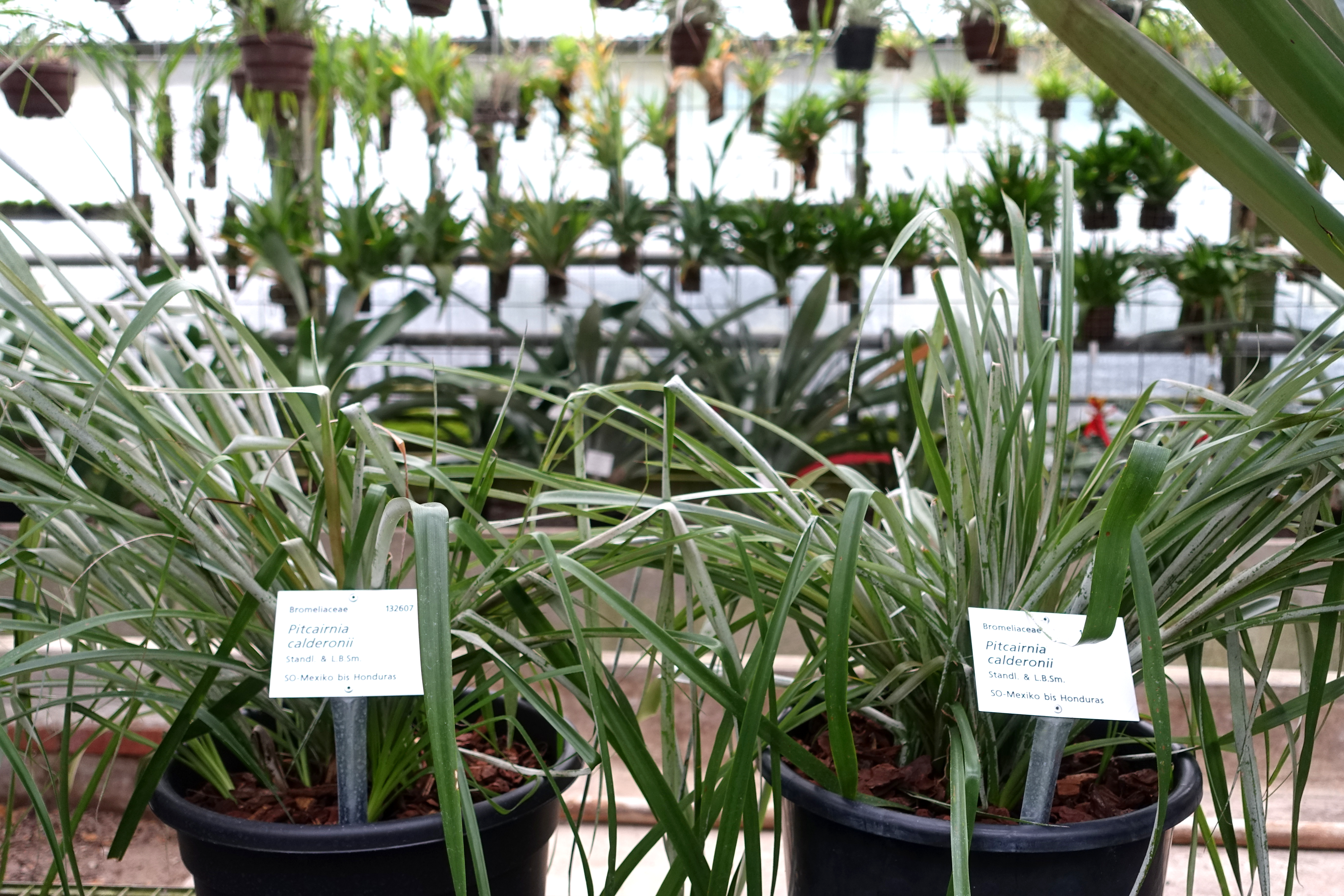

Scientific classification
- Kingdom: Plantae
- Clade: Tracheophytes
- Clade: Angiosperms
- Clade: Monocots
- Clade: Commelinids
- Order: Poales
- Family: Bromeliaceae
- Genus: Pitcairnia
- Species: P. calderonii

Binomial name
- Pitcairnia calderonii Standley & L.B.Smith

Synonyms
- Pitcairnia purpusii L.B.Sm.

= Pitcairnia calderonii =

Species of flowering plant

Pitcairnia calderonii is a plant species in the genus Pitcairnia. This species is native to Chiapas, Guatemala, El Salvador, and Honduras.
