= Pitcairnia poortmanii =

Scientific classification
- Kingdom: Plantae
- Clade: Tracheophytes
- Clade: Angiosperms
- Clade: Monocots
- Clade: Commelinids
- Order: Poales
- Family: Bromeliaceae
- Genus: Pitcairnia
- Species: P. poortmanii

Binomial name
- Pitcairnia poortmanii André

Synonyms
- Hepetis poortmanii (André) Mez

Species of plant

Pitcairnia poortmanii is a species of flowering plant in the Bromeliaceae family. It is native to Ecuador.
