= Pitcairnia cylindrostachya =

Scientific classification
- Kingdom: Plantae
- Clade: Tracheophytes
- Clade: Angiosperms
- Clade: Monocots
- Clade: Commelinids
- Order: Poales
- Family: Bromeliaceae
- Genus: Pitcairnia
- Species: P. cylindrostachya

Binomial name
- Pitcairnia cylindrostachya L.B.Sm.

Species of flowering plant

Pitcairnia cylindrostachya is a plant species in the genus Pitcairnia. This species is endemic to Mexico.
