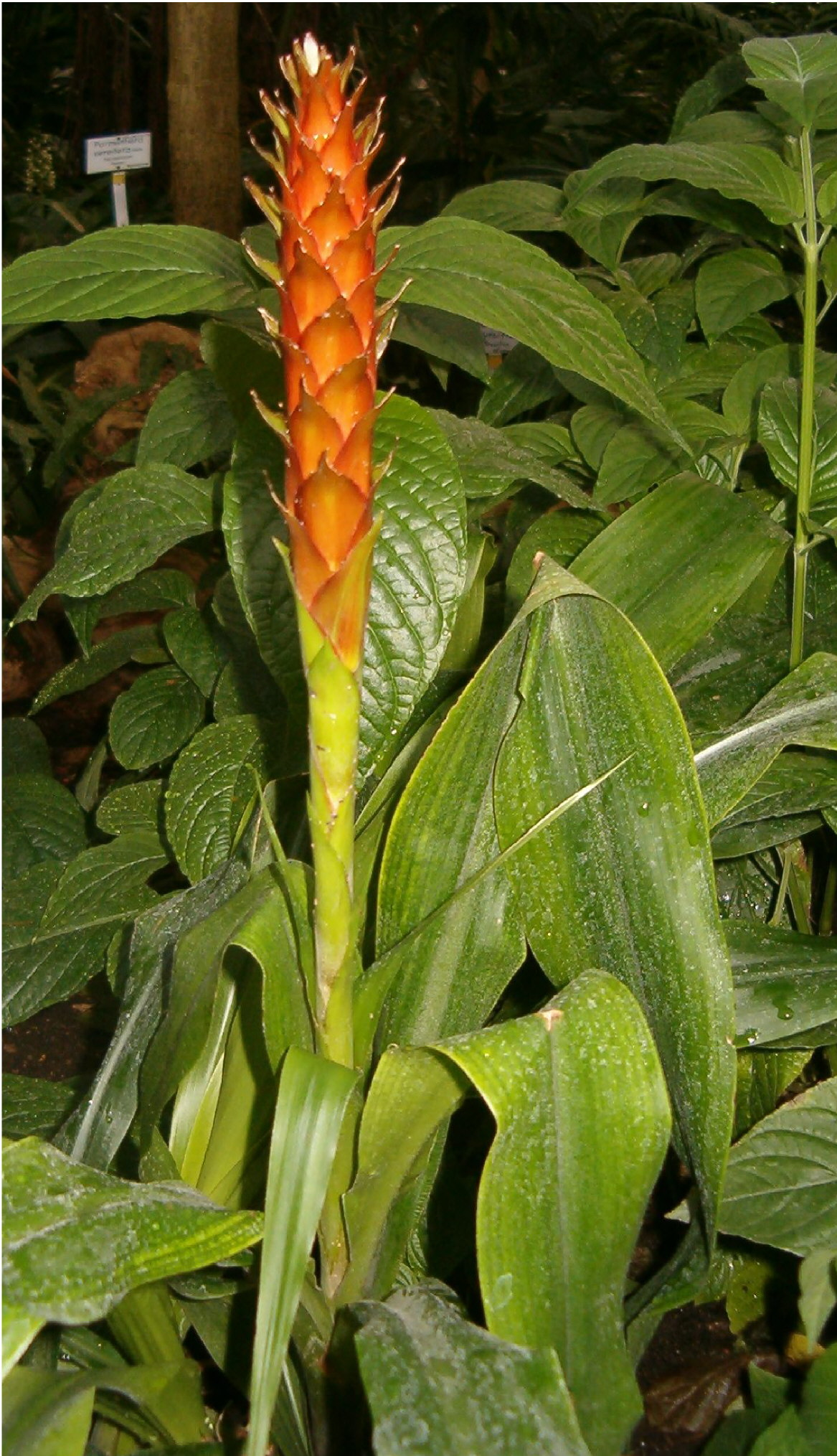

Scientific classification
- Kingdom: Plantae
- Clade: Tracheophytes
- Clade: Angiosperms
- Clade: Monocots
- Clade: Commelinids
- Order: Poales
- Family: Bromeliaceae
- Genus: Pitcairnia
- Species: P. wendlandii

Binomial name
- Pitcairnia wendlandii Baker

Synonyms
- Puya sulphurea Hook.; Neumannia sulphurea (Hook.) K.Koch; Phlomostachys sulphurea (Hook.) Beer; Pitcairnia sulphurea (Hook.) Mez 1935, illegitimate homonym, not Andrews 1802

= Pitcairnia wendlandii =

Species of plant

Pitcairnia wendlandii is a flowering plant in the Bromeliaceae family. It is native to Costa Rica, Panama, Honduras, Guatemala and Chiapas.
