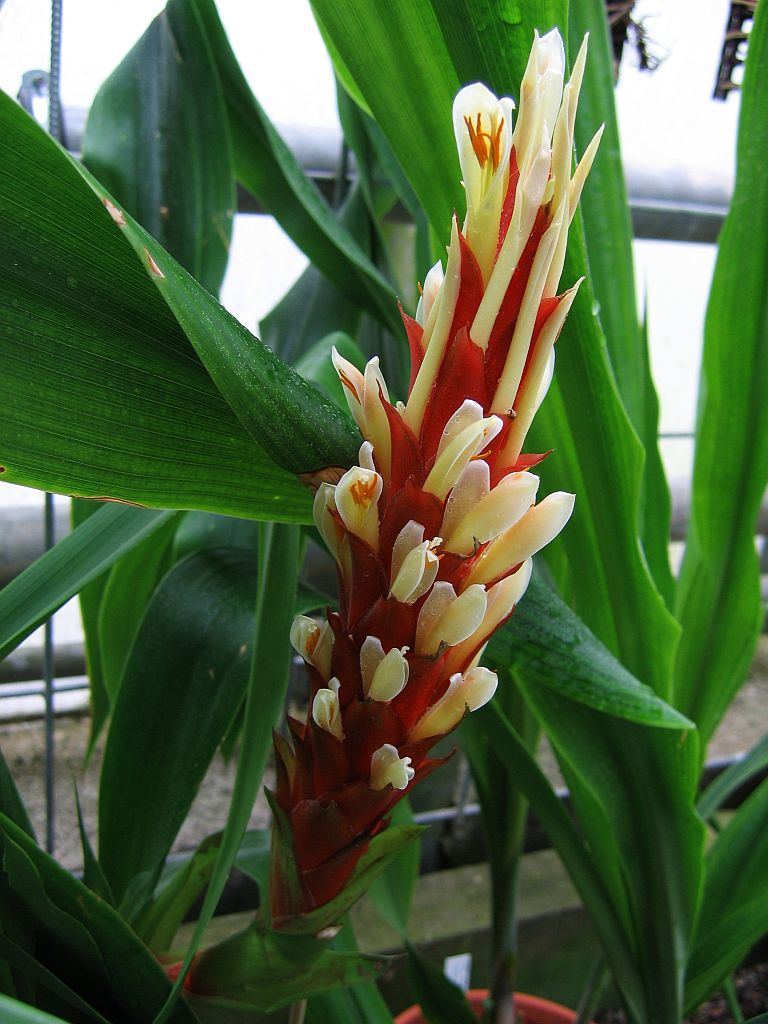
- Pitcairnia imbricata

Scientific classification
- Kingdom: Plantae
- Clade: Tracheophytes
- Clade: Angiosperms
- Clade: Monocots
- Clade: Commelinids
- Order: Poales
- Family: Bromeliaceae
- Genus: Pitcairnia
- Species: P. imbricata

Binomial name
- Pitcairnia imbricata (Brongniart) Regel

= Pitcairnia imbricata =

Species of flowering plant

Pitcairnia imbricata is a plant species in the genus Pitcairnia. This species is native to Mexico.
