= Pitcairnia chiapensis =

Scientific classification
- Kingdom: Plantae
- Clade: Tracheophytes
- Clade: Angiosperms
- Clade: Monocots
- Clade: Commelinids
- Order: Poales
- Family: Bromeliaceae
- Genus: Pitcairnia
- Species: P. chiapensis

Binomial name
- Pitcairnia chiapensis Miranda

Species of flowering plant

Pitcairnia chiapensis is a plant species in the genus Pitcairnia. This species is endemic to Mexico.

== Cultivars ==
- Pitcairnia 'Chiamenez'
- Pitcairnia 'Mexican Blondes'
