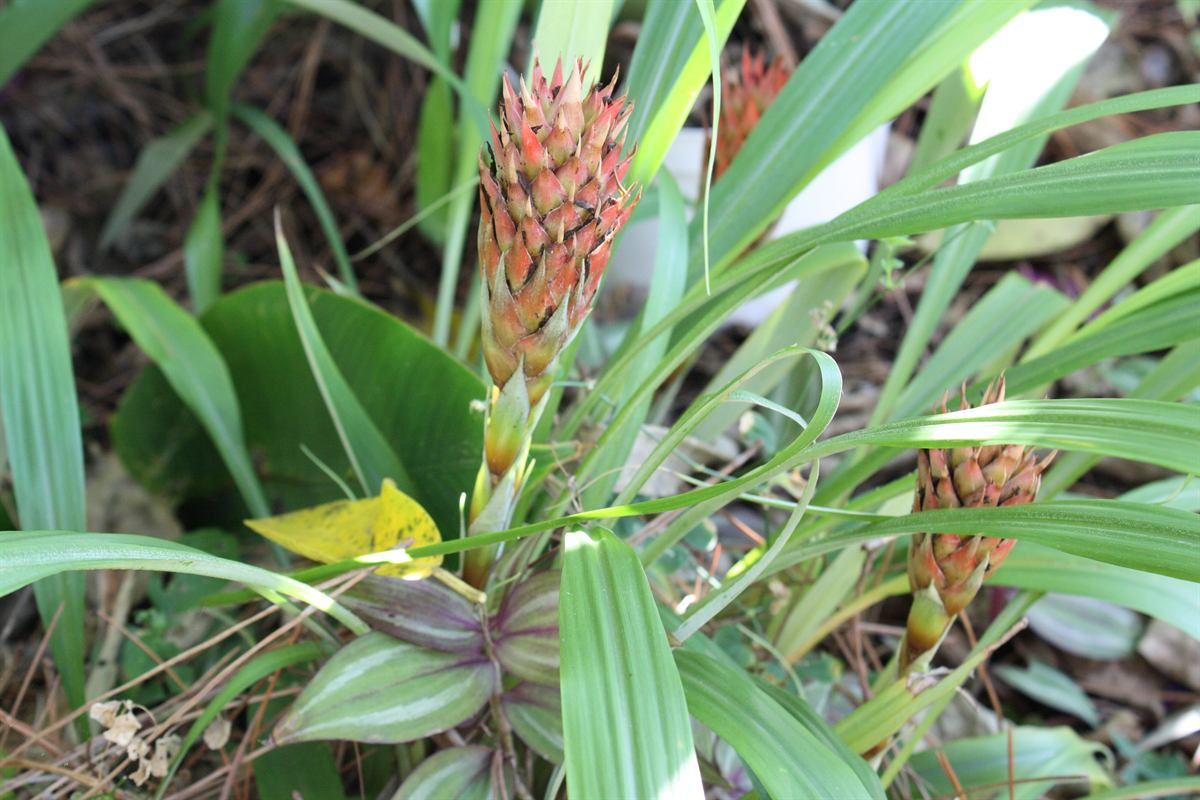

Scientific classification
- Kingdom: Plantae
- Clade: Tracheophytes
- Clade: Angiosperms
- Clade: Monocots
- Clade: Commelinids
- Order: Poales
- Family: Bromeliaceae
- Genus: Pitcairnia
- Species: P. smithiorum

Binomial name
- Pitcairnia smithiorum H. Luther

= Pitcairnia smithiorum =

Species of flowering plant

Pitcairnia smithiorum is a plant species in the genus Pitcairnia.

== Cultivars ==
- Pitcairnia 'Beaujolais'
- Pitcairnia 'Bud Curtis'
- Pitcairnia 'Hattie'
- Pitcairnia 'Jim Scrivner'
- Pitcairnia 'Stephen Hoppin'
- Pitcairnia 'Verdia Lowe'
