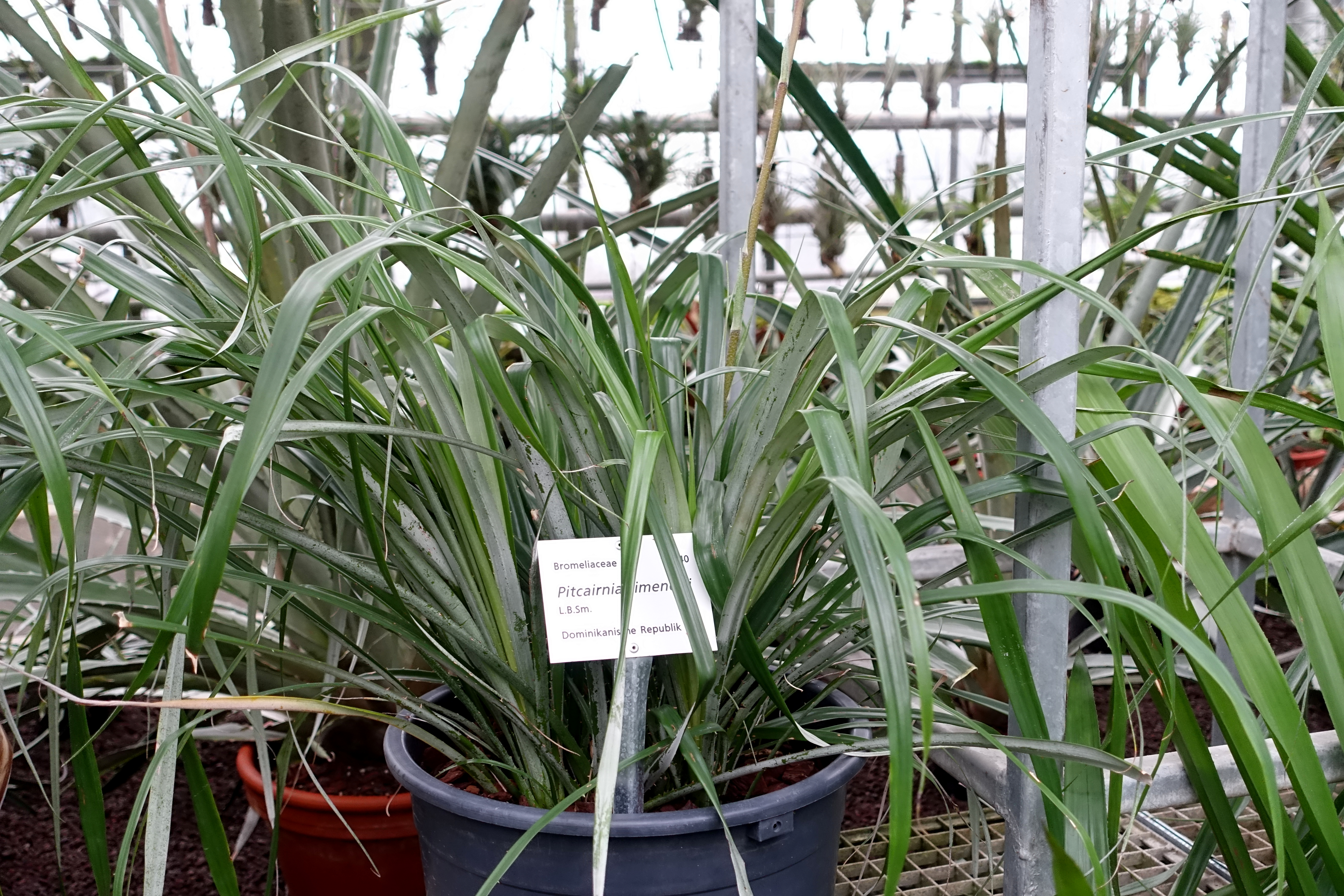

Scientific classification
- Kingdom: Plantae
- Clade: Tracheophytes
- Clade: Angiosperms
- Clade: Monocots
- Clade: Commelinids
- Order: Poales
- Family: Bromeliaceae
- Genus: Pitcairnia
- Species: P. jimenezii

Binomial name
- Pitcairnia jimenezii L.B.Sm.

= Pitcairnia jimenezii =

Species of flowering plant

Pitcairnia jimenezii is a plant species in the genus Pitcairnia. Native to mild climates, this plant does best in dense rainforest areas.

== Cultivars ==
- Pitcairnia 'Chiamenez'
