= Pitcairnia odontopoda =

Scientific classification
- Kingdom: Plantae
- Clade: Tracheophytes
- Clade: Angiosperms
- Clade: Monocots
- Clade: Commelinids
- Order: Poales
- Family: Bromeliaceae
- Genus: Pitcairnia
- Species: P. odontopoda

Binomial name
- Pitcairnia odontopoda Baker

Synonyms
- Hepetis odontopoda (Baker) Mez

Species of plant

Pitcairnia odontopoda is a species of flowering plant in the family Bromeliaceae. This species is native to Bolivia.
