= Pitcairnia vallisoletana =

Scientific classification
- Kingdom: Plantae
- Clade: Tracheophytes
- Clade: Angiosperms
- Clade: Monocots
- Clade: Commelinids
- Order: Poales
- Family: Bromeliaceae
- Genus: Pitcairnia
- Species: P. vallisoletana

Binomial name
- Pitcairnia vallisoletana Lexarza

Species of flowering plant

Pitcairnia vallisoletana is a plant species in the genus Pitcairnia. This species is endemic to Mexico.
