= Pitcairnia burle-marxii =

Scientific classification
- Kingdom: Plantae
- Clade: Tracheophytes
- Clade: Angiosperms
- Clade: Monocots
- Clade: Commelinids
- Order: Poales
- Family: Bromeliaceae
- Genus: Pitcairnia
- Species: P. burle-marxii

Binomial name
- Pitcairnia burle-marxii R.Braga & Sucre

Species of flowering plant

Pitcairnia burle-marxii is a plant species of the bromeliad genus Pitcairnia. This species is endemic to Brazil.

== Cultivars ==
- Pitcairnia 'Flaming Arrow'
