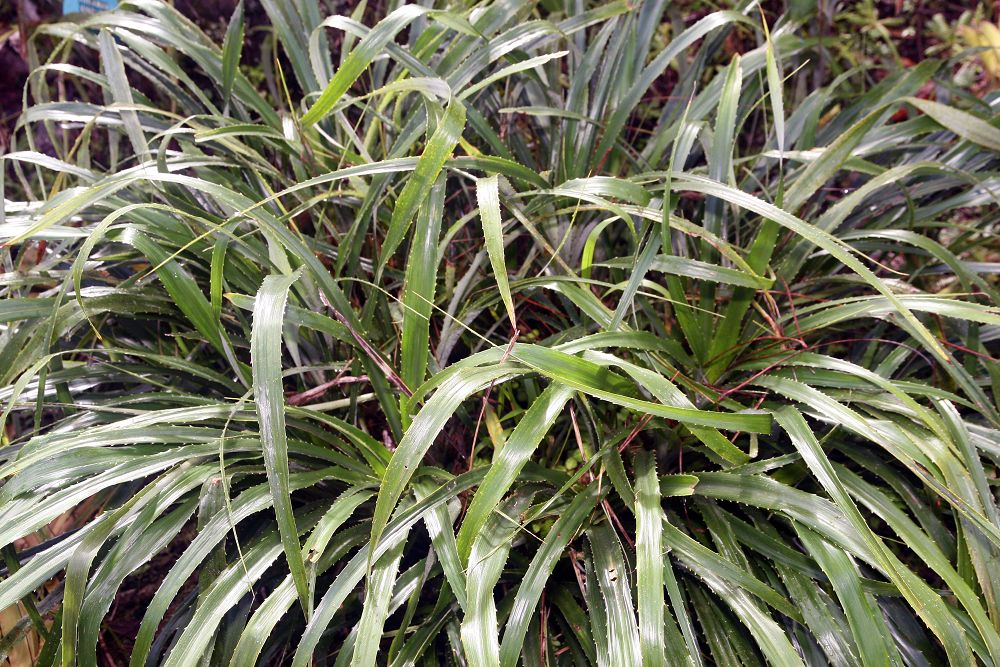

Scientific classification
- Kingdom: Plantae
- Clade: Tracheophytes
- Clade: Angiosperms
- Clade: Monocots
- Clade: Commelinids
- Order: Poales
- Family: Bromeliaceae
- Genus: Pitcairnia
- Species: P. angustifolia

Binomial name
- Pitcairnia angustifolia Aiton

Synonyms
- Hepetis angustifolia (Aiton) Raeusch; Pitcairnia tomentosa F.Dietr. ex Beer 1856, not Dieter. 1820; Hepetis tomentosa (F.Dietr. ex Beer) Mez; Pitcairnia latifolia Andrews ex Aiton; Hepetis latifolia (Andrews ex Aiton) Raeusch; Pitcairnia ramosa J.Jacq.; Pitcairnia platyphylla Schrad.; Pitcairnia intermedia Schult. & Schult.f.; Pitcairnia redouteana Schult. & Schult.f.; Pitcairnia skinneri Baker; Hepetis gracilis Mez; Hepetis latifolia (Andrews ex Aiton) Mez; Hepetis platyphylla (Schrad.) Mez; Hepetis ramosa (J.Jacq.) Mez; Pitcairnia gracilis (Mez) Mez; Pitcairnia angustifolia var. simplicior Proctor & Cedeño-Mald.

= Pitcairnia angustifolia =

Species of flowering plant

Pitcairnia angustifolia, the pina cortadora, is a plant species in the genus Pitcairnia. It is native to Puerto Rico and the Lesser Antilles.

== Cultivars ==
- Pitcairnia 'Borincana'
