= Pitcairnia schiedeana =

Scientific classification
- Kingdom: Plantae
- Clade: Tracheophytes
- Clade: Angiosperms
- Clade: Monocots
- Clade: Commelinids
- Order: Poales
- Family: Bromeliaceae
- Genus: Pitcairnia
- Species: P. schiedeana

Binomial name
- Pitcairnia schiedeana Baker

Synonyms
- Hepetis schiedeana (Baker) Mez

Species of plant

Pitcairnia schiedeana is a species of flowering plant in the Bromeliaceae family. This species is endemic to Mexico.
