= Pitcairnia kniphofioides =

Conservation status
- Vulnerable (IUCN 3.1)

Scientific classification
- Kingdom: Plantae
- Clade: Tracheophytes
- Clade: Angiosperms
- Clade: Monocots
- Clade: Commelinids
- Order: Poales
- Family: Bromeliaceae
- Genus: Pitcairnia
- Species: P. kniphofioides

Binomial name
- Pitcairnia kniphofioides

Species of flowering plant

Pitcairnia kniphofioides is a plant species in the genus Pitcairnia. This vulnerable species is endemic to Colombia. It was first described by Lyman Bradford Smith in 1935.
