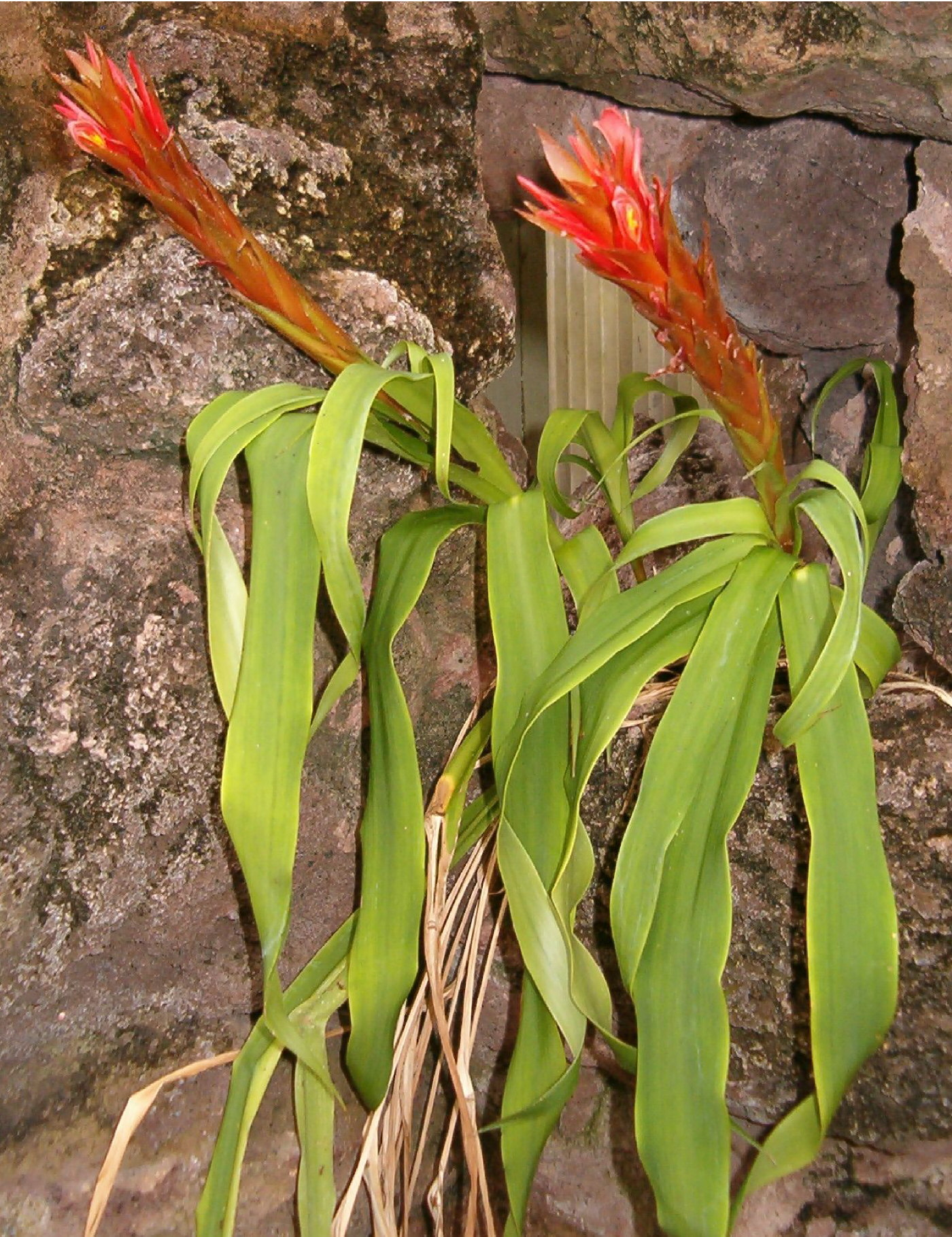
- Pitcairnia heydlauffii

Scientific classification
- Kingdom: Plantae
- Clade: Tracheophytes
- Clade: Angiosperms
- Clade: Monocots
- Clade: Commelinids
- Order: Poales
- Family: Bromeliaceae
- Subfamily: Pitcairnioideae
- Genus: Pitcairnia; L'Her.

Synonyms
- Hepetis Sw.; Spirastigma L'Hér. ex Schult. & Schult.f.; Codonanthes Raf.; Conanthes Raf.; Neumannia Brongn.; Lamproconus Lem.; Cochliopetalum Beer; Orthopetalum Beer; Phlomostachys K.Koch; Pepinia Brongn. ex André; Melinonia Brongn. ex E.Morren; Willrussellia A.Chev.; × Pitinia Irvin ex Baskerv.

= Pitcairnia =

Species of flowering plant

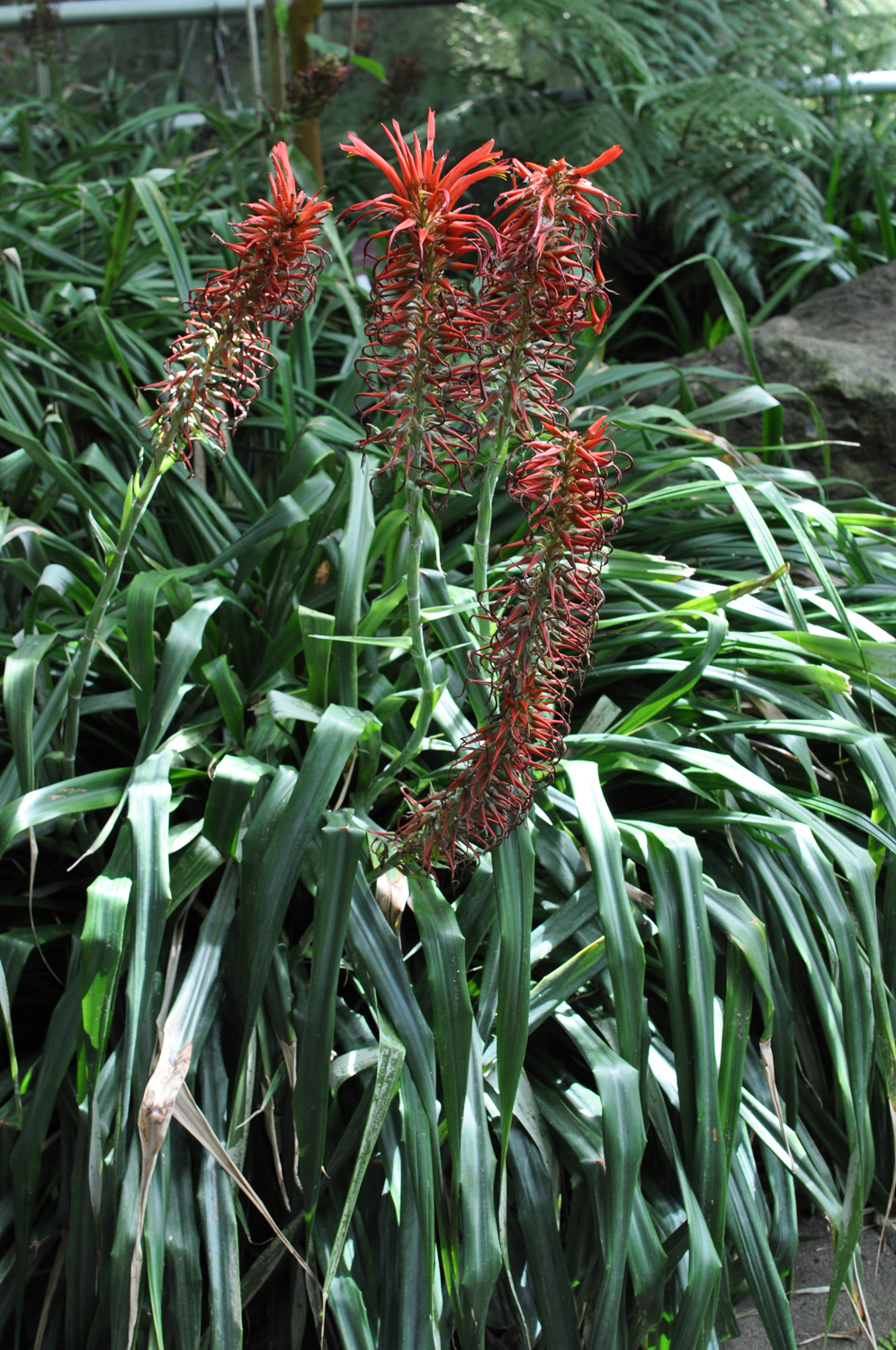
Pitcairnia spicata

Pitcairnia is a genus of plants in the family Bromeliaceae, subfamily Pitcairnioideae. It was named after William Pitcairn, Scottish physician and gardener (1711–1791). Pitcairnia ranks as the second most species-rich genus in the family Bromeliaceae, after Tillandsia. They are most abundant in Colombia, Peru and Brazil, but can also be found in areas from Cuba and Mexico south to Argentina. One species, Pitcairnia feliciana, is found in tropical West Africa, and is the only member of the family Bromeliaceae not native to the Americas.

Almost all Pitcairnias are terrestrial or saxicolous, and prefer moist areas. However, many are found growing epiphytically in trees.

== Taxonomy ==
Pitcairnia was established as a genus by Charles Louis L'Héritier de Brutelle in 1788. In 1870, Pepinia was established as a genus by Adolphe-Théodore Brongniart in a publication by Édouard André. Pepinia was reduced to a subgenus of Pitcairnia in 1881 by John Gilbert Baker, but elevated again to a genus in 1988, largely on the basis of the morphology of its seeds. The use of morphological characters to differentiate Pepinia from Pitcairnia was rejected in 1999; a view confirmed later by multiple molecular studies.

=== Species ===
As of November 2022, Plants of the World Online accepted 407 species, including those formerly placed in the genus Pepinia, now treated as Pitcairnia subgenus Pepinia.

- Pitcairnia abundans L.B.Sm. – Oaxaca, Nayarit
- Pitcairnia abyssicola Leme & L.Kollmann – Espírito Santo
- Pitcairnia acicularis L.B.Sm. – Lambayeque
- Pitcairnia adscendens L.B.Sm. – Valle del Cauca
- Pitcairnia aequatorialis L.B.Sm. – Ecuador
- Pitcairnia agavifolia L.B.Sm., syn. Pepinia agavifolia (L.B.Sm.) G.S.Varad. & Gilmartin – State of Amazonas in Venezuela
- Pitcairnia alata L.B.Sm. – Ecuador
- Pitcairnia albiflos Herb. – Rio de Janeiro
- Pitcairnia albifolia Cáceres Gonz. & A.Ibáñez
- Pitcairnia albolutea J.R.Grant – Venezuela
- Pitcairnia alborubra Baker, syn. Pepinia alborubra (Baker) G.S.Varad. & Gilmartin – Colombia, Ecuador
- Pitcairnia alexanderi (H.Luther) D.C.Taylor & H.Rob. – Ecuador
- Pitcairnia altensteinii (Link, Klotzsch & Otto) Lem. – Venezuela
- Pitcairnia altoatratoensis G.S.Varad. & Forero – Colombia
- Pitcairnia amblyosperma L.B.Sm., syn. Pepinia amblyosperma (L.B.Sm.) G.S.Varad. & Gilmartin – San Luis Potosí, Veracruz, Puebla
- Pitcairnia amboroensis Ibisch, R.Vásquez, E.Gross & M.Kessler – Bolivia
- Pitcairnia anarosae Gonz.-Rocha, Mejía-Marín & Espejo
- Pitcairnia ancuashii L.B.Sm. & Read – Peru
- Pitcairnia andreana Linden – Colombia
- Pitcairnia andreetae H.Luther – Ecuador
- Pitcairnia angustifolia Aiton – Puerto Rico, Lesser Antilles
- Pitcairnia anomala Hoehne, syn. Pepinia anomala (Hoehne) G.S.Varad. & Gilmartin – Mato Grosso
- Pitcairnia aphelandriflora Lem., syn. Pepinia aphelandriflora (Lem.) André – Panama, Peru, Ecuador
- Pitcairnia archeri L.B.Sm. – Colombia
- Pitcairnia arcuata (André) André – Costa Rica, Panama, Colombia, Peru, Ecuador
- Pitcairnia arenaria H.Luther – Peru
- Pitcairnia arenicola L.B.Sm. – Colombia
- Pitcairnia arida L.B.Sm. & Betancur – Colombia
- Pitcairnia armata Maury, syn. Pepinia armata (Maury) G.S.Varad. & Gilmartin – Venezuela
- Pitcairnia asplundii L.B.Sm. – Huánuco
- Pitcairnia atrorubens (Beer) Baker – from Nayarit south to Colombia
- Pitcairnia attenuata L.B.Sm. & Read, syn. – Peru
- Pitcairnia augusti Harms
- Pitcairnia aurea Rusby ex L.B.Sm. – Bolivia
- Pitcairnia aureobrunnea Rauh – Peru
- Pitcairnia azouryi Martinelli & Forzza – Espírito Santo
- Pitcairnia bakeri (André) Mez – Colombia, Ecuador
- Pitcairnia bakiorum Manzan. & W.Till – Ecuador
- Pitcairnia barbatostigma Leme & A.P.Fontana – Espírito Santo
- Pitcairnia barrigae L.B.Sm. – Colombia
- Pitcairnia basincurva L.B.Sm. & Betancur – Colombia
- Pitcairnia beachiae Utley & Burt-Utley, syn. Pepinia beachiae (Utley & Burt-Utley) H.Luther – Costa Rica
- Pitcairnia bella L.B.Sm. – Colombia, Ecuador
- Pitcairnia bergii H.Luther – Ecuador
- Pitcairnia betancurii L.B.Sm. – Colombia
- Pitcairnia beycalema Beer – Rio de Janeiro
- Pitcairnia bicolor L.B.Sm. & Read – Colombia
- Pitcairnia bifaria L.B.Sm. – Peru
- Pitcairnia biflora L.B.Sm. – Peru
- Pitcairnia bifrons (Lindl.) Read – Guadeloupe, St. Kitts
- Pitcairnia bifurcatispina Manzan. & W.Till – Ecuador
- Pitcairnia billbergioides L.B.Sm. – Peru
- Pitcairnia brachysperma André – Colombia, Ecuador
- Pitcairnia brackeana Manzan. & W.Till – Ecuador
- Pitcairnia bradei Markgr., syn. Pepinia bradei (Markgraf) G.S.Varad. & Gilmartin – Minas Gerais, Brasília
- Pitcairnia breedlovei L.B.Sm. – Oaxaca, Chiapas
- Pitcairnia brevicalycina Mez – Venezuela, Peru
- Pitcairnia brittoniana (Mez) Mez – Costa Rica, Nicaragua, Colombia, Venezuela, Guyana, Ecuador, Peru, Bolivia
- Pitcairnia bromeliifolia L'Hér. – Jamaica
- Pitcairnia brongniartiana André – Colombia, Ecuador
- Pitcairnia brunnescens L.B.Sm. – Colombia, Ecuador
- Pitcairnia bulbosa L.B.Sm., syn. Pepinia bulbosa (L.B.Sm.) G.S.Varad. & Gilmartin – Colombia, Venezuela
- Pitcairnia burle-marxii Braga & Sucre – Espírito Santo
- Pitcairnia buscalionii W.Till – State of Amazonas in Brazil
- Pitcairnia caduciflora Rauh & E.Gross – Ecuador
- Pitcairnia calatheoides L.B.Sm. – Peru
- Pitcairnia calcicola J.R.Grant & J.F.Morales – Costa Rica
- Pitcairnia calderonii Standl. & L.B.Sm. – Chiapas, Guatemala, El Salvador, Honduras
- Pitcairnia calophylla L.B.Sm. – Colombia
- Pitcairnia camposii H.Luther – Peru
- Pitcairnia cana B.Holst – State of Amazonas in Venezuela
- Pitcairnia cantuoides R.Vásquez & Ibisch – Bolivia
- Pitcairnia capitata L.B.Sm. – Nariño in Colombia
- Pitcairnia capixaba Fraga & Leme – Espírito Santo
- Pitcairnia cardenasii L.B.Sm. – Bolivia
- Pitcairnia caricifolia Mart. ex Schult. & Schult.f., syn. Pepinia caricifolia (Mart. ex Schult. & Schult.f.) G.S.Varad. & Gilmartin – Colombia, Venezuela, the Guianas, northern Brazil
- Pitcairnia carinata Mez – Rio de Janeiro
- Pitcairnia carioana Wittm. – Chiapas, Guatemala
- Pitcairnia carnea Beer – Panama
- Pitcairnia carnososepala Rauh & Gross, syn. Pepinia carnososepala (Rauh & E.Gross) H.Luther – Ecuador
- Pitcairnia cassapensis Mez – Peru
- Pitcairnia cataractae Manzan. & W.Till – Ecuador
- Pitcairnia caulescens (K.Koch ex Mez) Mez – Venezuela
- Pitcairnia cerrateana L.B.Sm. – Ancash in Peru
- Pitcairnia chiapensis Miranda – Chiapas
- Pitcairnia chiquitana R.Vásquez & Ibisch – Bolivia
- Pitcairnia chiriguana A.Cast. – Salta in Argentina
- Pitcairnia chiriquensis L.B.Sm. – Panama
- Pitcairnia chocoensis L.B.Sm. – Colombia
- Pitcairnia clarkii H.Luther – Ecuador
- Pitcairnia clavata L.B.Sm. – Peru
- Pitcairnia cofanorum Manzan. & W.Till – Ecuador
- Pitcairnia colimensis L.B.Sm. – Colima, Michoacán
- Pitcairnia commixta L.B.Sm. – Venezuela, Colombia, Ecuador
- Pitcairnia compostelae McVaugh – Jalisco, Nayarit
- Pitcairnia condorensis Manzan. & W.Till – Ecuador
- Pitcairnia corallina Linden & André, syn. Pepinia corallina (Linden & André) G.S.Varad. & Gilmartin – Colombia, Peru, northern Brazil
- Pitcairnia corcovadensis Wawra – Rio de Janeiro
- Pitcairnia cosangaensis Gilmartin – Ecuador
- Pitcairnia costata L.B.Sm., syn. Pepinia costata (L.B.Sm.) G.S.Varad. & Gilmartin – Colombia
- Pitcairnia crassa L.B.Sm. – Bolivia
- Pitcairnia cremersii Gouda – Suriname, French Guiana
- Pitcairnia crinita E.Pereira & Martinelli, syn. Pepinia martinellii H.Luther, nom. superfl. – Pará
- Pitcairnia cristalinensis (Leme) D.C.Taylor & H.Rob., syn. Pepinia cristalinensis Leme – Goiás
- Pitcairnia croatii H.Luther – Panama
- Pitcairnia ctenophylla L.B.Sm., syn. Pepinia ctenophylla (L.B.Sm.) G.S.Varad. & Gilmartin – State of Bolívar in Venezuela
- Pitcairnia cuatrecasasiana L.B.Sm.
- Pitcairnia cubensis (Mez) L.B.Sm. – Cuba
- Pitcairnia curvidens L.B.Sm. & Read – Minas Gerais
- Pitcairnia cuzcoensis L.B.Sm. – Cusco in Peru
- Pitcairnia cyanopetala Ule – Peru
- Pitcairnia cylindrostachya L.B.Sm. – Jalisco, Mexico State, Oaxaca, Nayarit
- Pitcairnia decidua L.B.Sm. – Espírito Santo, Rio de Janeiro, Minas Gerais
- Pitcairnia decurvata L.B.Sm. – Peru
- Pitcairnia delicata H.Luther – Colombia
- Pitcairnia dendroidea André – Colombia, Ecuador
- Pitcairnia densiflora Brongn. ex Lem. – Veracruz, Guerrero
- Pitcairnia deroosei Manzan. & W.Till – Ecuador
- Pitcairnia devansayana André – Ecuador
- Pitcairnia diffusa L.B.Sm. – Colombia, Ecuador
- Pitcairnia divaricata Wittm. – Bolivia
- Pitcairnia diversifolia Leme & A.P.Fontana
- Pitcairnia dodsonii H.Luther – Ecuador
- Pitcairnia dolichopetala Harms – Colombia, Ecuador
- Pitcairnia domingensis L.B.Sm. – Dominican Republic
- Pitcairnia echinata Hook. – Colombia, Venezuela
- Pitcairnia egleri L.B.Sm. – Pará
- Pitcairnia elizabethae L.B.Sm. – Hispaniola
- Pitcairnia ellenbergii L.B.Sm. – Cusco in Peru
- Pitcairnia elliptica Mez & Sodiro – Ecuador
- Pitcairnia elongata L.B.Sm. – Peru, Colombia, Ecuador
- Pitcairnia elvirae D.C.Taylor & H.Rob., syn. Pepinia verrucosa E.Gross – Ecuador
- Pitcairnia encholirioides L.B.Sm. – Rio de Janeiro
- Pitcairnia ensifolia Mez, syn. Pepinia ensifolia (Mez) G.S.Varad. & Gilmartin – Goiás
- Pitcairnia epiphytica L.B.Sm., syn. Pepinia epiphytica (L.B.Sm.) G.S.Varad. & Gilmartin – State of Amazonas in Venezuela
- Pitcairnia eximia Mez – Junín in Peru
- Pitcairnia explosiva L.B.Sm. & Betancur – Colombia
- Pitcairnia exserta L.B.Sm. – Colombia
- Pitcairnia farinosa L.B.Sm. & Betancur – Colombia
- Pitcairnia feliciana (A.Chev.) Harms & Mildbr. – Guinea in West Africa
- Pitcairnia fendleri (Mez) Mez – Venezuela
- Pitcairnia ferrell-ingramiae H.Luther & Dalström – Ecuador
- Pitcairnia ferreyrae L.B.Sm. – Ucayali in Peru
- Pitcairnia filifera L.B.Sm. ex H.Luther – Peru
- Pitcairnia filispina L.B.Sm., syn. Pepinia filispina (L.B.Sm.) G.S.Varad. & Gilmartin – State of Amazonas in Venezuela
- Pitcairnia fimbriatobracteata Rauh, syn. Pepinia fimbriatobracteata (Rauh) G.S.Varad. & Gilmartin – Peru
- Pitcairnia flagellaris L.B.Sm. – Guatemala, Honduras
- Pitcairnia flammea Lindl. – southeastern Brazil
- Pitcairnia flavescenta Matuda
- Pitcairnia flexuosa L.B.Sm. – Guatemala, El Salvador, central + southern Mexico
- Pitcairnia floresii Gouda & Ric.Fernández – Peru
- Pitcairnia fluvialis L.B.Sm. & Betancur – Colombia
- Pitcairnia foliacea L.B.Sm. – Michoacán
- Pitcairnia foreroi H.Luther & G.S.Varad. – Colombia
- Pitcairnia formosa L.B.Sm. & Betancur – Colombia
- Pitcairnia fosteriana L.B.Sm. – Colombia
- Pitcairnia fractifolia L.B.Sm. – Peru
- Pitcairnia frequens L.B.Sm. & B.Holst ex Saraiva & Forzza – State of Amazonas in Brazil
- Pitcairnia fruticosa L.B.Sm. & Betancur – Colombia
- Pitcairnia fuertesii Mez – Hispaniola
- Pitcairnia funkiae M.A.Spencer & L.B.Sm. – Costa Rica
- Pitcairnia fusca H.Luther – Ecuador
- Pitcairnia gemmipara L.B.Sm. & Betancur – Colombia
- Pitcairnia geotropa J.R.Grant – Panama
- Pitcairnia geyskesii L.B.Sm., syn. Pepinia geyskesii (L.B.Sm.) G.S.Varad. & Gilmartin – northern Brazil, the Guianaa
- Pitcairnia glauca Leme & A.P.Fontana – Espírito Santo
- Pitcairnia glaziovii Baker – Rio de Janeiro
- Pitcairnia glymiana K.Koch – described 1868 from material collected in Caribbean; probably extinct
- Pitcairnia goudae Manzan. & W.Till – Ecuador
- Pitcairnia graniticola B.Holst, syn. – State of Bolívar in Venezuela
- Pitcairnia grubbiana L.B.Sm. – Boyacá in Colombia
- Pitcairnia guaritermae André – Cundinamarca in Colombia
- Pitcairnia gutteana W.Weber – Peru
- Pitcairnia guzmanioides L.B.Sm. – Costa Rica, Peru, Colombia
- Pitcairnia halophila L.B.Sm. – Costa Rica, Panama
- Pitcairnia hammelii H.Luther, syn. Pepinia hammelii (H.Luther) H.Luther – Panama
- Pitcairnia harlingii L.B.Sm., syn. Pepinia harlingii (L.B.Sm.) G.S.Varad. & Gilmartin – Ecuador
- Pitcairnia harrylutheri D.C.Taylor & H.Rob. – Ecuador
- Pitcairnia hatschbachii E.Pereira – Goiás
- Pitcairnia haughtii L.B.Sm. – Cauca in Colombia
- Pitcairnia heerdeae E.Gross & Rauh – Colombia
- Pitcairnia heliophila L.B.Sm., syn. Pepinia heliophila (L.B.Sm.) G.S.Varad. & Gilmartin – Colombia
- Pitcairnia heterophylla (Lindl.) Beer – Peru, Ecuador, Colombia, Venezuela, Central America, central + southern Mexico
- Pitcairnia heydlauffii R.Vásquez & Ibisch – Bolivia
- Pitcairnia hintoniana L.B.Sm. – México State, Guerrero
- Pitcairnia hirtzii H.Luther – Ecuador
- Pitcairnia hitchcockiana L.B.Sm. – Venezuela, Ecuador
- Pitcairnia holstii (H.Luther) J.R.Grant – Peru
- Pitcairnia hooveri (H.Luther) D.C.Taylor & H.Rob., syn. Pepinia hooveri H.Luther – Ecuador
- Pitcairnia huilensis Betancur & Jiménez-Esc.
- Pitcairnia imbricata (Brongn.) Regel – Central America, central + southern Mexico
- Pitcairnia inaequalis W.Weber, syn. – Brazil; probably extinct
- Pitcairnia inermis (E.Mey. ex C.Presl) E.Mey. ex Schult. & Schult.f. – Peru, Bolivia
- Pitcairnia insularis Tatagiba & R.J.V.Alves – Rio de Janeiro
- Pitcairnia integrifolia Ker Gawl. – Trinidad, Venezuela, Brazil
- Pitcairnia irwiniana L.B.Sm. – Goiás
- Pitcairnia jaramilloi G.S.Varad. & Forero – Colombia
- Pitcairnia jareckii Proctor & Cedeño-Mald. – British Virgin Islands
- Pitcairnia jimenezii L.B.Sm. – Dominican Republic
- Pitcairnia johannis L.B.Sm. – Santander in Colombia
- Pitcairnia juncoides L.B.Sm., syn. Pepinia juncoides (L.B.Sm.) G.S.Varad. & Gilmartin
- Pitcairnia juzepczukii W.Weber – Junín in Peru
- Pitcairnia kalbreyeri Baker – Costa Rica, Colombia, Panama
- Pitcairnia karwinskyana Schult. & Schult.f. – central Mexico from Zacatecas to Guerrero
- Pitcairnia killipiana L.B.Sm., syn. Pepinia killipiana (L.B.Sm.) G.S.Varad. & Gilmartin – Colombia
- Pitcairnia kirkbridei L.B.Sm. & Read – Pará
- Pitcairnia kniphofioides L.B.Sm. – Colombia
- Pitcairnia koeneniana E.Gross & Barthlott – Nayarit
- Pitcairnia kressii H.Luther – Panama
- Pitcairnia kroemeri H.Luther – Bolivia
- Pitcairnia kunhardtiana L.B.Sm., syn. Pepinia kunhardtiana (L.B.Sm.) G.S.Varad. & Gilmartin – State of Amazonas in Venezuela
- Pitcairnia lanuginosa Ruiz & Pav. – Peru, Bolivia, Brazil
- Pitcairnia laxissima Baker – Cauca in Colombia
- Pitcairnia lechleri Baker – Peru
- Pitcairnia lehmannii Baker – Peru, Ecuador, Colombia
- Pitcairnia leopoldii (W.Till & S.Till) B.Holst, syn. Pepinia leopoldii W.Till & S.Till – State of Amazonas in Venezuela
- Pitcairnia lepidopetalon L.B.Sm. – Nariño in Colombia
- Pitcairnia leprosa L.B.Sm. – Guerrero
- Pitcairnia lignosa L.B.Sm. – Colombia
- Pitcairnia limae L.B.Sm., syn. Pepinia limae (L.B.Sm.) G.S.Varad. & Gilmartin – Ceará
- Pitcairnia lindae Betancur – Colombia
- Pitcairnia loki-schmidtiae Rauh & Barthlott – Jalisco
- Pitcairnia longipes Mez – Cauca in Colombia
- Pitcairnia longissimiflora Ibisch, R.Vásquez & E.Gross – Bolivia
- Pitcairnia lopezii L.B.Sm. – La Libertad in Peru
- Pitcairnia luschnathii W.Weber, syn. – Brazil; probably extinct
- Pitcairnia lutescens Mez & Sodiro – Ecuador
- Pitcairnia luteyniorum L B Sm. & Read, syn. Pepinia luteyniorum (L.B.Sm. & Read) G.S.Varad. & Gilmartin
- Pitcairnia lutheri Manzan. & W.Till – Ecuador
- Pitcairnia lyman-smithiana H.Luther
- Pitcairnia macarenensis L.B.Sm. – Colombia
- Pitcairnia macranthera André – Colombia, Ecuador
- Pitcairnia macrobotrys André – Colombia
- Pitcairnia maguirei L.B.Sm., syn. Pepinia maguirei (L.B.Sm.) G.S.Varad. & Gilmartin – State of Amazonas in Venezuela
- Pitcairnia maidifolia (C.Morren) Decne. ex Planch. – Suriname, Guyana, Venezuela, Colombia, Ecuador, Central America
- Pitcairnia marinii Manzan. & W.Till – Ecuador
- Pitcairnia maritima L.B.Sm. – Colombia
- Pitcairnia marnier-lapostollei L.B.Sm. – Peru
- Pitcairnia matogrossensis E.Pereira & Leme – Mato Grosso
- Pitcairnia matudae L.B.Sm. – Chiapas
- Pitcairnia megasepala Baker – Panama, Costa Rica, Colombia
- Pitcairnia melanopoda L.B.Sm. – Peru
- Pitcairnia membranifolia Baker – Costa Rica
- Pitcairnia meridensis (Klotzsch ex Mez) Mez – Venezuela
- Pitcairnia micheliana Andrews – Michoacán, Jalisco
- Pitcairnia micotrinensis Read – Dominica, Martinique
- Pitcairnia microcalyx Baker – Venezuela
- Pitcairnia micropoda L.B.Sm. – México State
- Pitcairnia minicorallina (H.Luther) J.R.Grant – Peru
- Pitcairnia mirandae Utley & Burt-Utley – Chiapas
- Pitcairnia mituensis L.B.Sm., syn. Pepinia mituensis (L.B.Sm.) G.S.Varad. & Gilmartin – Colombia
- Pitcairnia modesta L.B.Sm. – Guerrero
- Pitcairnia mohammadii Ibisch & R.Vásquez – Bolivia
- Pitcairnia monticola Brandegee – Sinaloa
- Pitcairnia mooreana L.B.Sm. – Guerrero
- Pitcairnia moritziana K.Koch & C.D.Bouché – Venezuela
- Pitcairnia mucida L.B.Sm. & Read – Colombia
- Pitcairnia multiflora L.B.Sm. – Panama, Colombia
- Pitcairnia multiramosa (Mez) Mez – Chuquisaca
- Pitcairnia neeana (L.B.Sm. ex H.Luther) J.R.Grant
- Pitcairnia neglecta (H.Luther) D.C.Taylor & H.Rob., syn. Pepinia neglecta H.Luther – Peru
- Pitcairnia neillii Manzan. & W.Till – Rondônia
- Pitcairnia nematophora L.B.Sm. & Read – State of Amazonas in Venezuela
- Pitcairnia nigra (Carrière) André – Colombia, Panama, Ecuador
- Pitcairnia nobilis Mez & Sodiro – Chimborazo
- Pitcairnia nortefluminensis Leme – Rio de Janeiro
- Pitcairnia nubigena Planch. – Venezuela
- Pitcairnia nuda Baker, syn. Pepinia nuda (Baker) G.S.Varad. & Gilmartin – Guyana, Suriname, Venezuela
- Pitcairnia oaxacana L.B.Sm. – Oaxaca, Michoacán, Guerrero
- Pitcairnia oblongifolia L.B.Sm. – Ecuador
- Pitcairnia occidentalis L.B.Sm., syn. Pepinia occidentalis (L.B.Sm.) G.S.Varad. & Gilmartin – Colombia
- Pitcairnia odontopoda Baker – Peru, Bolivia
- Pitcairnia olivaestevae J.R.Grant
- Pitcairnia oranensis L.B.Sm. – Salta in Argentina
- Pitcairnia orchidifolia Mez – Venezuela
- Pitcairnia oxapampae H.Luther – Peru
- Pitcairnia palaciosii Manzan. & W.Till – Ecuador
- Pitcairnia pallidiflavens Rauh – Peru
- Pitcairnia palmeri S.Watson – central + western Mexico
- Pitcairnia palmoides Mez & Sodiro – Colombia, Ecuador
- Pitcairnia paniculata (Ruiz & Pav.) Ruiz & Pav. – Peru, Bolivia
- Pitcairnia paraguayensis L.B.Sm. – Paraguay
- Pitcairnia patentiflora L.B.Sm., syn. Pepinia patentiflora (L.B.Sm.) G.S.Varad. & Gilmartin – Brazil, French Guiana, Venezuela, Colombia
- Pitcairnia pavonii (Mez) Mez – Ecuador
- Pitcairnia pectinata L.B.Sm., syn. Pepinia pectinata (L.B.Sm.) G.S.Varad. & Gilmartin – Antioquia of Colombia
- Pitcairnia peruana (H.Luther) J.R.Grant – Peru
- Pitcairnia petraea L.B.Sm. – Cundinamarca
- Pitcairnia phelpsiae (L.B.Sm.) B.Holst & L.B.Sm. – State of Amazonas in Venezuela
- Pitcairnia piepenbringii Rauh & E.Gross – Bahia
- Pitcairnia platypetala Mez, syn. Pepinia platypetala (Mez) G.S.Varad. & Gilmartin – Brazil or Venezuela; probably extinct
- Pitcairnia platystemon (Mez) Mez – Santa Cruz in Bolivia
- Pitcairnia poeppigiana Mez – Peru
- Pitcairnia pomacochae Rauh – Peru
- Pitcairnia poortmanii André – Colombia, Ecuador
- Pitcairnia prolifera Rauh – Loja in Ecuador
- Pitcairnia pruinosa Kunth, syn. Pepinia pruinosa Kunth – Colombia, Venezuela
- Pitcairnia pseudopungens Rauh – Peru
- Pitcairnia pseudoundulata Rauh – Peru
- Pitcairnia pteropoda L.B.Sm. – Michoacán, Jalisco, Guerrero
- Pitcairnia puberula Mez & Donn.Sm. – Guatemala, El Salvador, Honduras, Chiapas, Oaxaca, Guerrero
- Pitcairnia pulverulenta Ruiz & Pav. – Peru
- Pitcairnia pungens Kunth – Colombia, Ecuador, Peru
- Pitcairnia punicea Scheidw., syn. Pepinia punicea (Scheidw.) Andrews – Guatemala, Belize, Yucatán Peninsula, Veracruz, Tabasco, Chiapas
- Pitcairnia pusilla (Mez) Mez – French Guiana
- Pitcairnia puyoides L.B.Sm. – Peru
- Pitcairnia queroana Espejo & López-Ferr.
- Pitcairnia quesnelioides L.B.Sm., syn. Pepinia quesnelioides (L.B.Sm.) G.S.Varad. & Gilmartin – Colombia, Costa Rica, Peru
- Pitcairnia ramosii M.A.Spencer & L.B.Sm. – Colombia
- Pitcairnia rectiflora Rauh – Peru
- Pitcairnia recurvata (Scheidw.) K.Koch – Guatemala, Belize, Chiapas
- Pitcairnia reflexiflora André – Ecuador
- Pitcairnia rigida Mez – Colombia, Peru
- Pitcairnia ringens Klotzsch – Hidalgo, Michoacán, Oaxaca, Puebla, Querétaro, San Luis Potosí, Tamaulipas, Veracruz
- Pitcairnia riparia Mez – Ecuador, Peru
- Pitcairnia robert-downsii Gonz.-Rocha, Espejo, López-Ferr. & Cast.-Riv.
- Pitcairnia rojasii H.Luther – Amazonas Province in Peru
- Pitcairnia rondonicola L.B.Sm. & Read – State of Amazonas in Brazil
- Pitcairnia roseana L.B.Sm. – from Durango to Guerrero
- Pitcairnia roseoalba E.Gross & Rauh – Peru
- Pitcairnia rubiginosa Baker, syn. Pepinia rubiginosa (Baker) G.S.Varad. & Gilmartin – French Guiana, Guyana, Venezuela, Colombia, northern Brazil
- Pitcairnia rubronigriflora Rauh – Peru
- Pitcairnia ruderalis L.B.Sm. – Ucayali
- Pitcairnia ruiziana (Mez) Mez – Peru
- Pitcairnia rundelliana J.R.Grant – Panama
- Pitcairnia sagasteguii L.B.Sm. & Read – Peru
- Pitcairnia saltensis L.B.Sm. – Salta in Argentina
- Pitcairnia samuelssonii L.B.Sm. – Hispaniola
- Pitcairnia sandemanii L.B.Sm. – Junín in Peru
- Pitcairnia sanguinea (H.Luther) D.C.Taylor & H.Rob., syn. Pepinia sanguinea H.Luther – Colombia
- Pitcairnia sastrei L.B.Sm. & Read – Amapá, French Guiana
- Pitcairnia saxicola L.B.Sm. – Chiapas, Costa Rica, Panama
- Pitcairnia saxosa Gouda – French Guiana
- Pitcairnia scandens Ule – Peru
- Pitcairnia sceptriformis Mez – Ecuador, Peru
- Pitcairnia sceptrigera Mez – Ecuador
- Pitcairnia schiedeana Baker – Veracruz, Oaxaca
- Pitcairnia schultzei Harms – Panama, Venezuela
- Pitcairnia schunkei L.B.Sm. & Read – Peru
- Pitcairnia secundiflora L.B.Sm. – Chiapas, Honduras
- Pitcairnia semaphora L.B.Sm. – Colombia
- Pitcairnia semijuncta Baker
- Pitcairnia serrulata L.B.Sm. & Read – Peru
- Pitcairnia setipetiola L.B.Sm. & Betancur – Colombia
- Pitcairnia similis L.B.Sm. – Colombia
- Pitcairnia simulans H.Luther – Ecuador
- Pitcairnia singularis Flores-Arg., Espejo & López-Ferr.
- Pitcairnia smithiorum H.Luther – Peru
- Pitcairnia sneidernii L.B.Sm. – Colombia
- Pitcairnia sodiroi Mez – Ecuador
- Pitcairnia sordida L.B.Sm. – Guerrero
- Pitcairnia spectabilis (Mez) Mez – Colombia, Ecuador
- Pitcairnia spicata (Lam.) Mez – Martinique
- Pitcairnia sprucei Baker, syn. Pepinia sprucei (Baker) G.S.Varad. & Gilmartin – Venezuela, Colombia, Peru, northern Brazil, Guyana, French Guiana
- Pitcairnia squarrosa L.B.Sm. – Colombia, Ecuador
- Pitcairnia staminea G.Lodd. – eastern Brazil from Bahia to Rio de Janeiro
- Pitcairnia stenophylla André – Colombia, Peru
- Pitcairnia stevensonii H.Luther & Whitten – Pichincha
- Pitcairnia steyermarkii L.B.Sm. – Falcón in Venezuela
- Pitcairnia stolonifera L.B.Sm. & Read – Peru
- Pitcairnia straminea (Poepp. ex Mez) Mez – Huánuco in Peru
- Pitcairnia suaveolens Lindl. – Minas Gerais, Rio de Janeiro
- Pitcairnia subfuscopetala Rauh & Hebding – Peru
- Pitcairnia subulifera L.B.Sm. – Huánuco in Peru
- Pitcairnia sulphurea Andrews – St. Vincent in Caribbean
- Pitcairnia susannae Manzan. & W.Till – Ecuador
- Pitcairnia sylvestris L.B.Sm. – Cauca in Colombia
- Pitcairnia tabuliformis Linden – Oaxaca, Chiapas, Guatemala
- Pitcairnia tarapotensis Baker – Peru
- Pitcairnia tatzyanae (H.Luther) D.C.Taylor & H.Rob., syn. Pepinia tatzyanae H.Luther – Peru
- Pitcairnia tillandsioides L.B.Sm. – Guerrero
- Pitcairnia tillii Manzan. – Ecuador
- Pitcairnia tolimensis L.B.Sm. – Colombia
- Pitcairnia torresiana L.B.Sm. – Mato Grosso
- Pitcairnia trianae André – Bolivia, Peru, Ecuador, Colombia
- Pitcairnia trimorpha L.B.Sm. – Colombia
- Pitcairnia truncata L.B.Sm. – Peru
- Pitcairnia tuberculata L.B.Sm. – Mérida in Venezuela
- Pitcairnia tuerckheimii Donn.Sm. – Oaxaca, Chiapas, Guatemala
- Pitcairnia tumulicola L.B.Sm. – Nariño in Colombia
- Pitcairnia turbinella L.B.Sm., syn. Pepinia turbinella (L.B.Sm.) G.S.Varad. & Gilmartin – Colombia, Venezuela
- Pitcairnia tympani L.B.Sm. – Mérida in Venezuela
- Pitcairnia uaupensis Baker, syn. Pepinia uaupensis (Baker) G.S.Varad. & Gilmartin – Colombia, Venezuela, northern Brazil
- Pitcairnia ulei L.B.Sm. – Goiás, Brasília
- Pitcairnia umbratilis L.B.Sm. – Huánuco
- Pitcairnia undulata Scheidw. – Chiapas, Oaxaca, Tabasco, Veracruz
- Pitcairnia unilateralis L.B.Sm. – Ecuador
- Pitcairnia utcubambensis Rauh – Peru
- Pitcairnia valerii Standl.
- Pitcairnia vallisoletana Lex. – Jalisco, Michoacán
- Pitcairnia vandersteenii Gouda
- Pitcairnia vargasiana L.B.Sm. – Cusco
- Pitcairnia vargasii R.Vásquez & Ibisch
- Pitcairnia venezuelana L.B.Sm. & Steyerm. – Venezuela
- Pitcairnia ventidirecta L.B.Sm. & Betancur – Colombia
- Pitcairnia verrucosa L.B.Sm. – Colombia, Ecuador
- Pitcairnia villetaensis Rauh – Colombia
- Pitcairnia violascens L.B.Sm. – Ecuador
- Pitcairnia virginalis Utley & Burt-Utley – Oaxaca
- Pitcairnia volker-schaedlichii P.J.Braun
- Pitcairnia wendlandii Baker – Chiapas, Central America
- Pitcairnia wendtiae Tatagiba & B.R.Silva – Rio de Janeiro
- Pitcairnia wilburiana Utley ex L.B.Sm. & Read – Guatemala
- Pitcairnia wolfei L.B.Sm. – Huánuco
- Pitcairnia woronowii W.Weber – Colombia
- Pitcairnia xanthocalyx Mart. – Querétaro, San Luis Potosí
- Pitcairnia yaupi-bajaensis Rauh – Peru
- Pitcairnia yocupitziae Espejo & López-Ferr. – Guerrero

== Cultivars and hybrids ==
- Pitcairnia albiflos × staminea
- Pitcairnia × daiseyana
- Pitcairnia 'Beaujolais'
- Pitcairnia 'Bud Curtis'
- Pitcairnia 'Chiamenez'
- Pitcairnia 'Coral Horizon'
- Pitcairnia 'Flaming Arrow'
- Pitcairnia 'Hartwig'
- Pitcairnia 'Hattie'
- Pitcairnia 'Jim Scrivner'
- Pitcairnia 'Maroni'
- Pitcairnia 'Pinot Noir'
- Pitcairnia 'Stardust'
- Pitcairnia 'Stephen Hoppin'
- Pitcairnia 'Verdia Lowe'
