= Puya retrorsa =

Conservation status
- Near Threatened (IUCN 3.1)

Scientific classification
- Kingdom: Plantae
- Clade: Tracheophytes
- Clade: Angiosperms
- Clade: Monocots
- Clade: Commelinids
- Order: Poales
- Family: Bromeliaceae
- Genus: Puya
- Species: P. retrorsa

Binomial name
- Puya retrorsa Gilmartin

Species of shrub

Puya retrorsa is a species of plant in the family Bromeliaceae that is endemic to Ecuador. Its natural habitats are subtropical or tropical dry shrubland and subtropical or tropical high-altitude shrubland. It is threatened by habitat loss.
