= Puya venezuelana =

Scientific classification
- Kingdom: Plantae
- Clade: Tracheophytes
- Clade: Angiosperms
- Clade: Monocots
- Clade: Commelinids
- Order: Poales
- Family: Bromeliaceae
- Genus: Puya
- Subgenus: Puya subg. Puyopsis
- Species: P. venezuelana

Binomial name
- Puya venezuelana L.B. Smith

Species of flowering plant

Puya venezuelana is a species in the genus Puya. This species is endemic to Venezuela.
