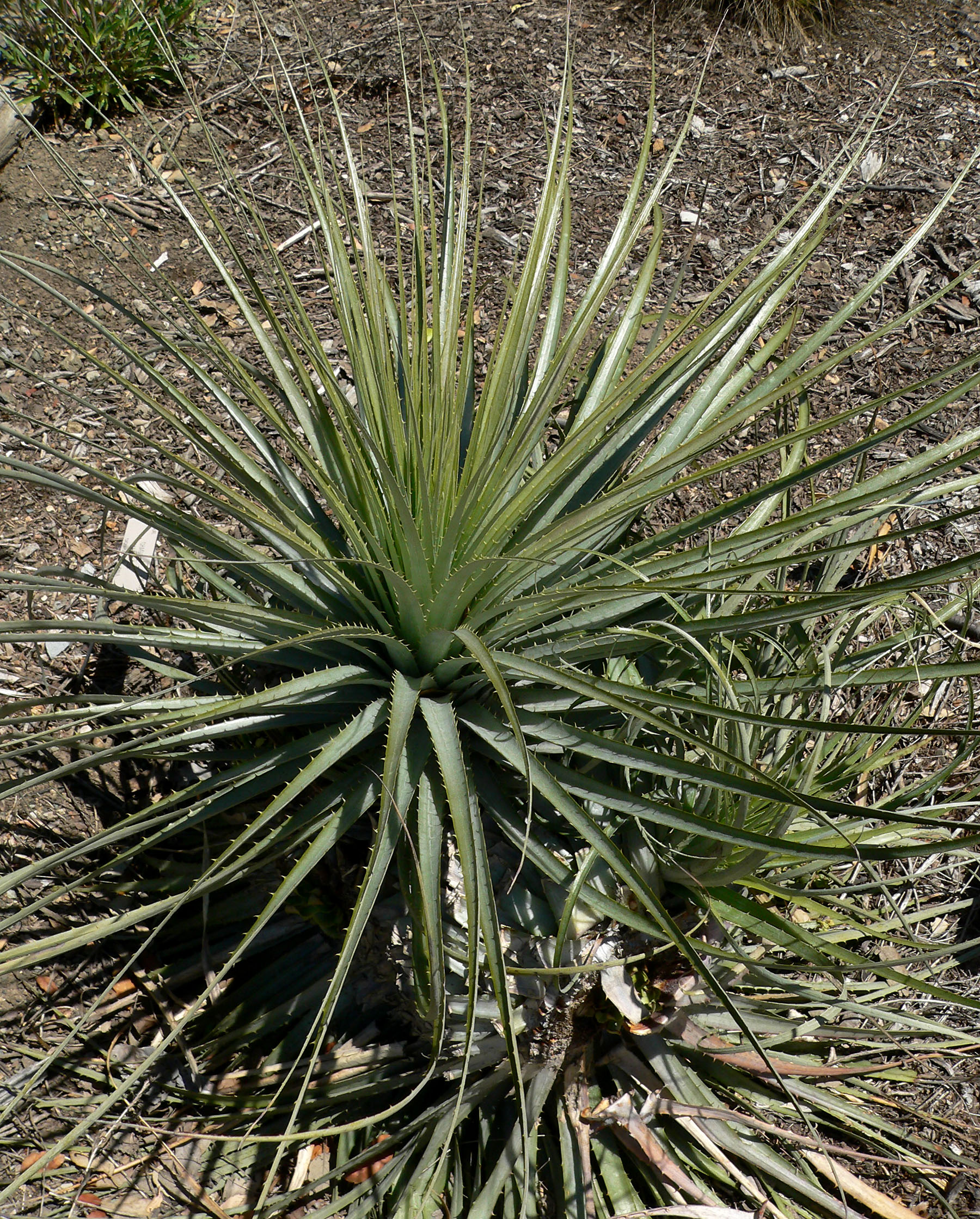

Scientific classification
- Kingdom: Plantae
- Clade: Embryophytes
- Clade: Tracheophytes
- Clade: Spermatophytes
- Clade: Angiosperms
- Clade: Monocots
- Clade: Commelinids
- Order: Poales
- Family: Bromeliaceae
- Genus: Puya
- Subgenus: Puya subg. Puyopsis
- Species: P. coerulea

Binomial name
- Puya coerulea Lindley

= Puya coerulea =

Species of plant

Puya coerulea is a species of plant in the genus Puya. This species is endemic to Chile.

== Gallery ==
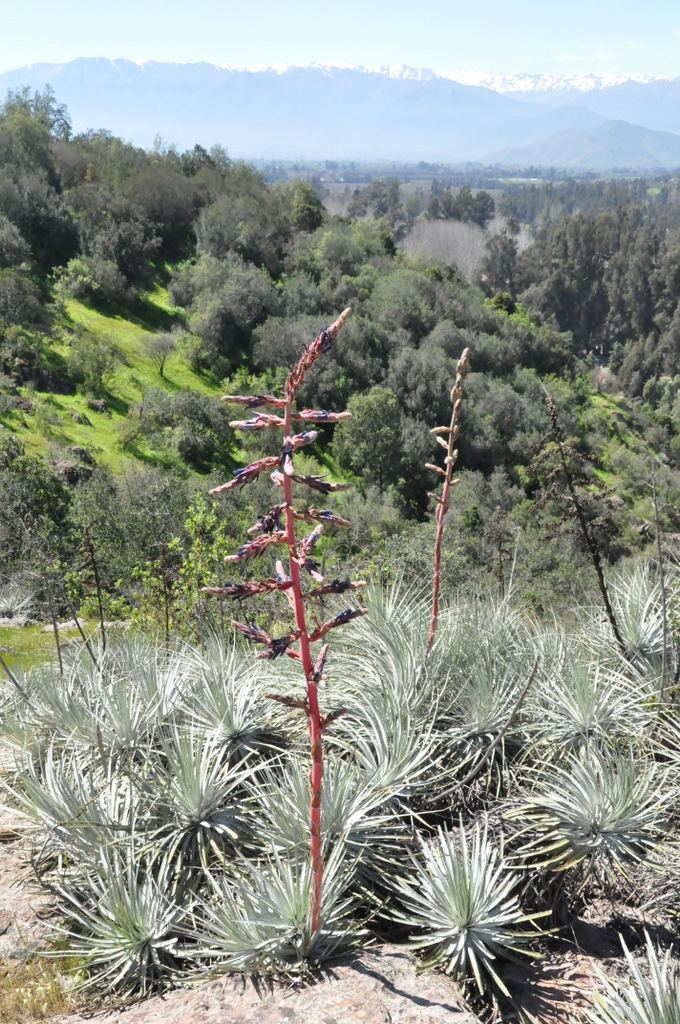
Puya coerulea in its natural environment.

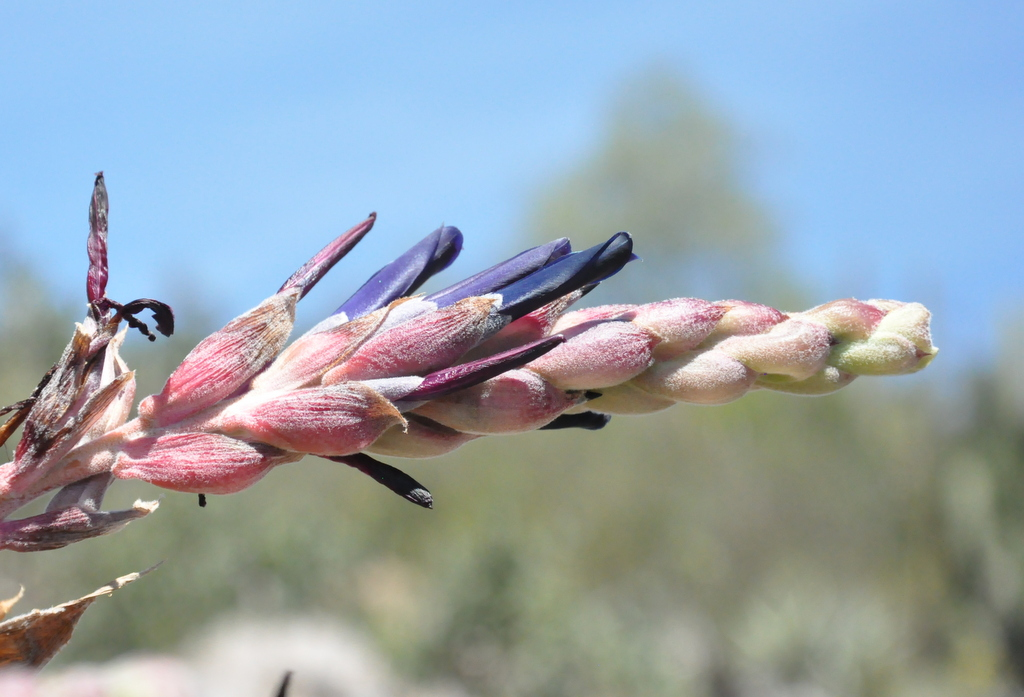
Detail of the inflorescence

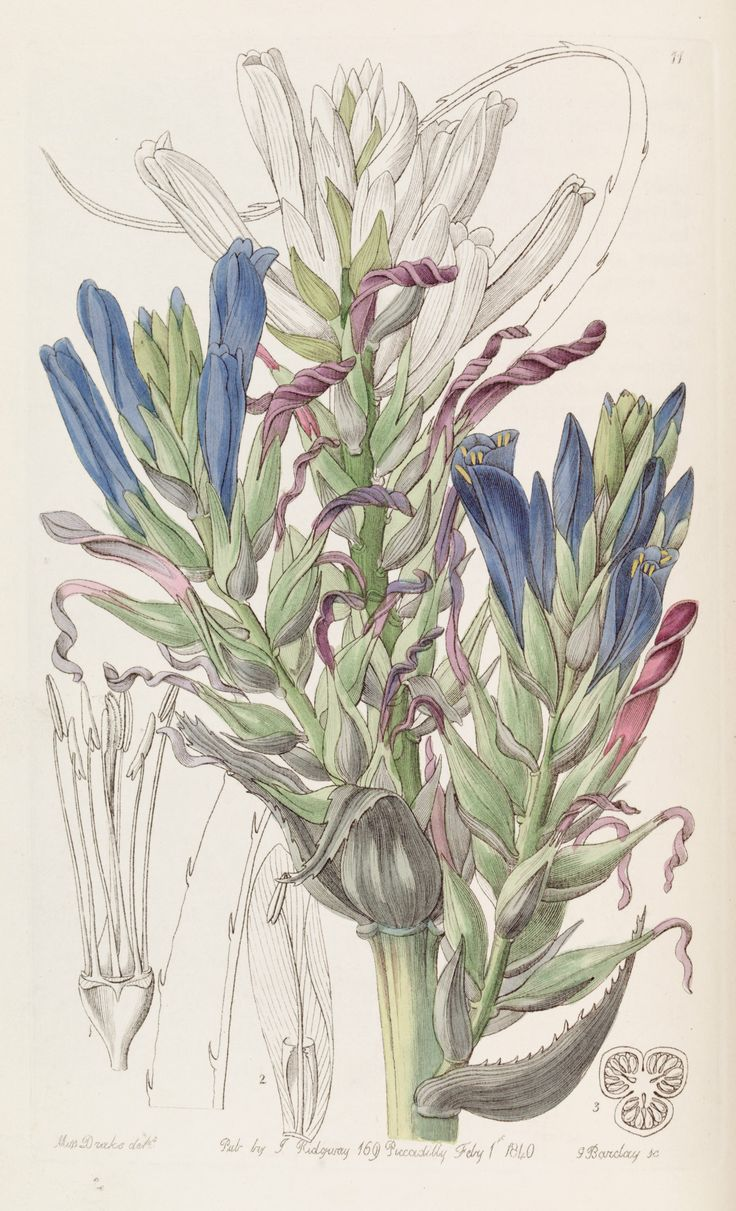
Scientific illustration

== Subspecies ==
- P. c. var. violacea (Brongniart) Smith
- P. c. var. monteroana (Smith & Looser) Smith & Looser
- P. c. var. intermedia (Smith & Looser) Smith & Looser
