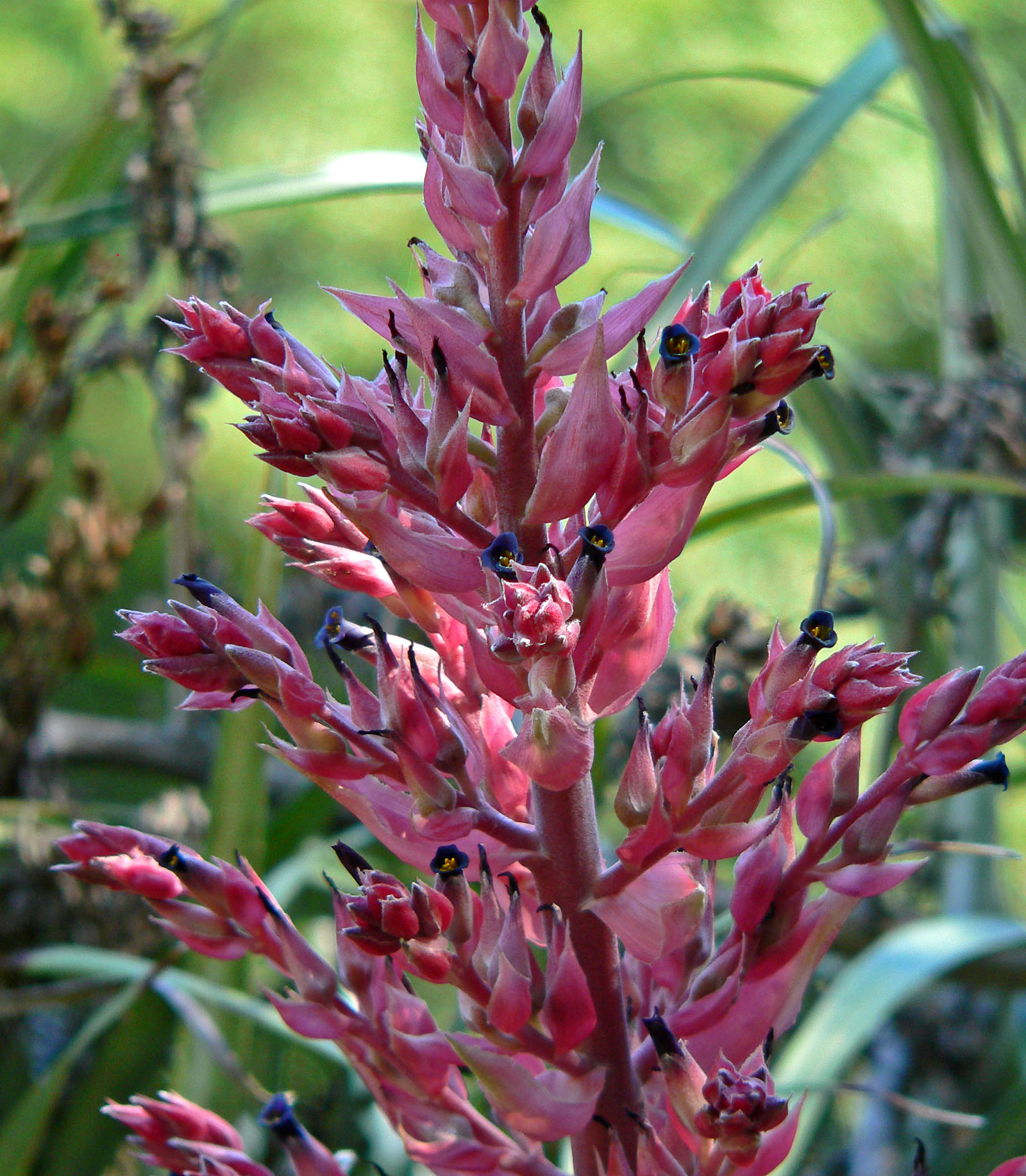

Conservation status
- Least Concern (IUCN 3.1)

Scientific classification
- Kingdom: Plantae
- Clade: Embryophytes
- Clade: Tracheophytes
- Clade: Spermatophytes
- Clade: Angiosperms
- Clade: Monocots
- Clade: Commelinids
- Order: Poales
- Family: Bromeliaceae
- Genus: Puya
- Subgenus: Puya subg. Puyopsis
- Species: P. dyckioides

Binomial name
- Puya dyckioides (Baker) Mez

Synonyms
- Pitcairnia dyckioides Baker

= Puya dyckioides =

Species of plant

Puya dyckioides is a species of flowering plant in the Bromeliaceae family. It is native to Bolivia.
