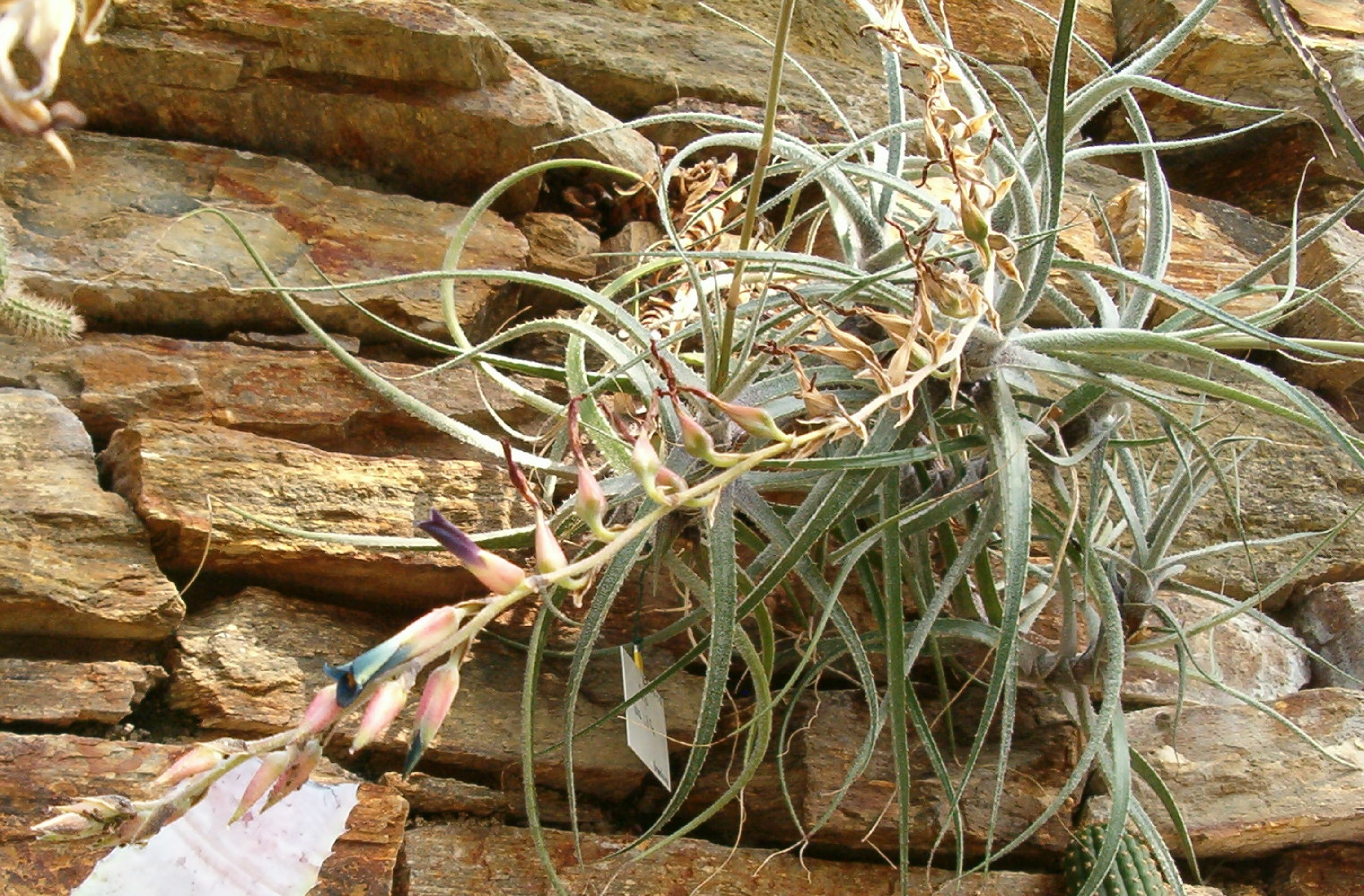

Scientific classification
- Kingdom: Plantae
- Clade: Embryophytes
- Clade: Tracheophytes
- Clade: Spermatophytes
- Clade: Angiosperms
- Clade: Monocots
- Clade: Commelinids
- Order: Poales
- Family: Bromeliaceae
- Genus: Puya
- Subgenus: Puya subg. Puyopsis
- Species: P. laxa

Binomial name
- Puya laxa L.B. Smith

= Puya laxa =

Species of flowering plant

Puya laxa is a species in the genus Puya. This species is endemic to Bolivia.

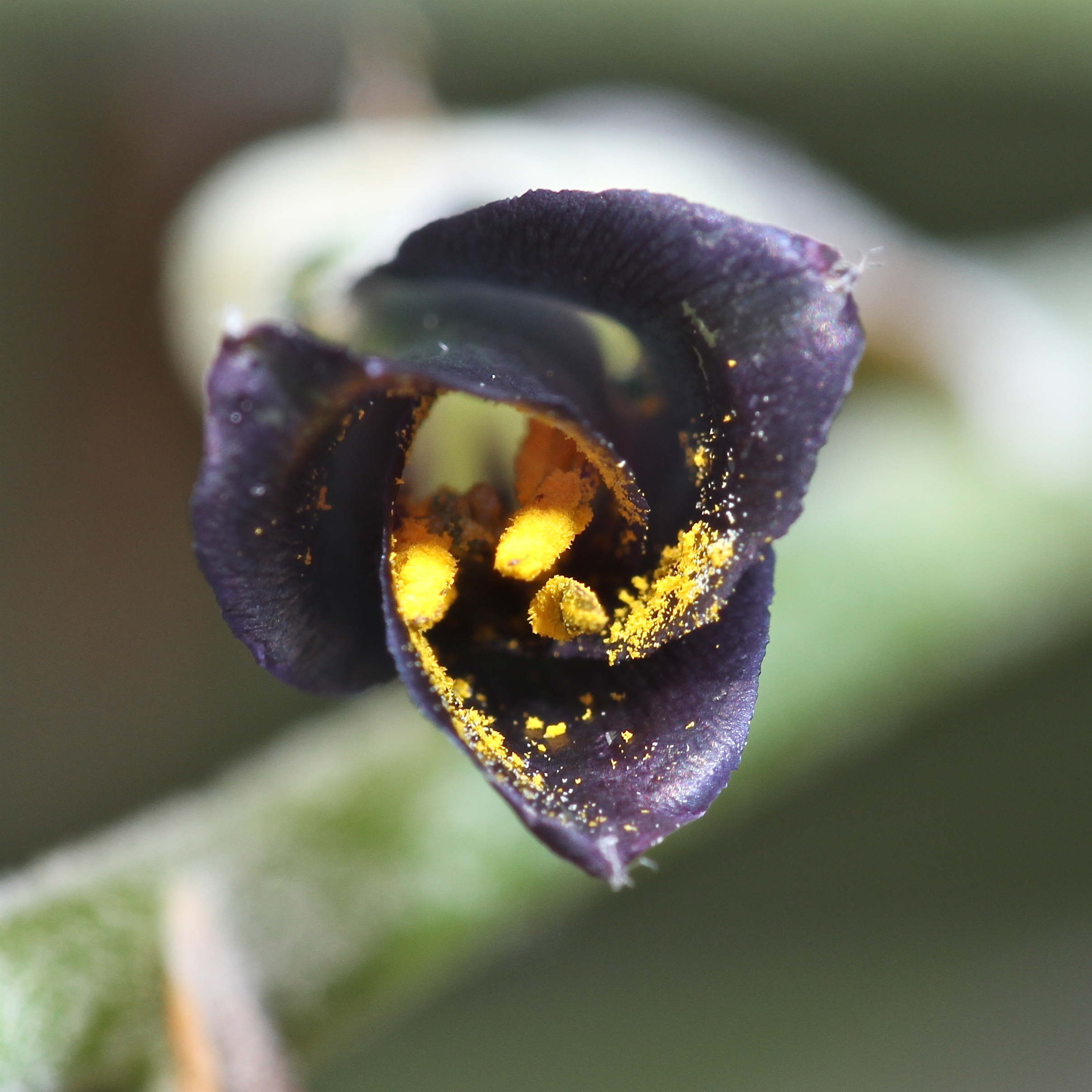
a single Puya laxa Flower

== Cultivars ==
- xPuckia 'Sparkle'
- xPucohnia 'George Anderson'
