= Puya olivacea =

Scientific classification
- Kingdom: Plantae
- Clade: Tracheophytes
- Clade: Angiosperms
- Clade: Monocots
- Clade: Commelinids
- Order: Poales
- Family: Bromeliaceae
- Genus: Puya
- Subgenus: Puya subg. Puyopsis
- Species: P. olivacea

Binomial name
- Puya olivacea Wittmack

Species of plant

Puya olivacea is a species in the genus Puya. This species is endemic to Bolivia. The only known occurrences of it are in the mountainous region in the geographic center of the country.
