= Puya valida =

Scientific classification
- Kingdom: Plantae
- Clade: Tracheophytes
- Clade: Angiosperms
- Clade: Monocots
- Clade: Commelinids
- Order: Poales
- Family: Bromeliaceae
- Genus: Puya
- Subgenus: Puya subg. Puyopsis
- Species: P. valida

Binomial name
- Puya valida L.B. Smith

Species of flowering plant

Puya valida is a species in the genus Puya. This species is endemic to Bolivia. Its scientific name is Puya valida L.B.Sm.

== Bibliography ==
- Krömer, Thorsten; Kessler, Michael; Holst, Bruce K.; Luther, Harry E.; Gouda, Eric J.; Ibisch, Pierre L.; Till, Walter; Vásquez, Roberto (1 October 1999). "Checklist of Bolivian Bromeliaceae with Notes on Species Distribution and Levels of Endemism". Selbyana. 20 (2): 201–223. ISSN 2689-0682. JSTOR 41760025.
