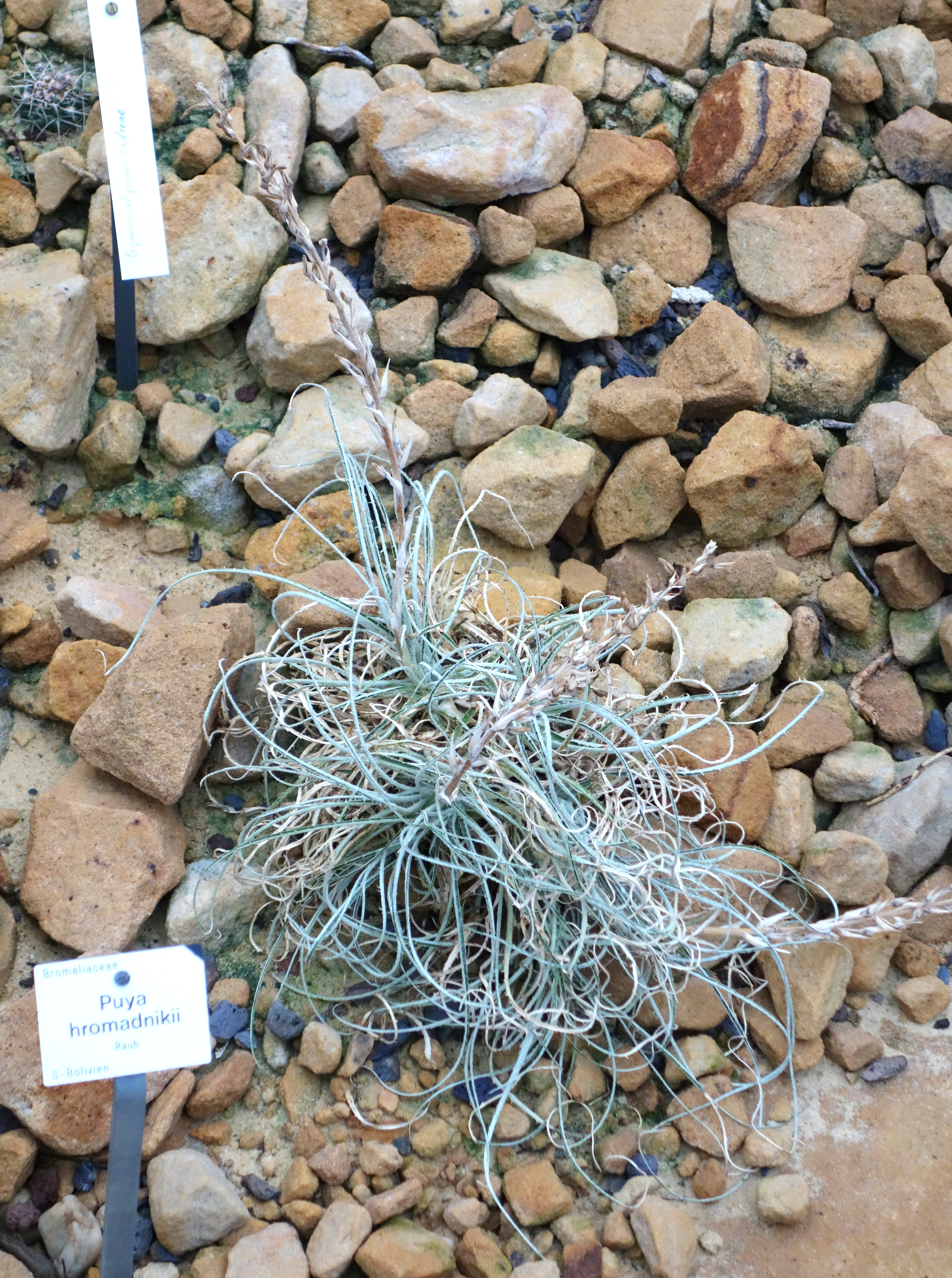

Scientific classification
- Kingdom: Plantae
- Clade: Tracheophytes
- Clade: Angiosperms
- Clade: Monocots
- Clade: Commelinids
- Order: Poales
- Family: Bromeliaceae
- Genus: Puya
- Subgenus: Puya subg. Puyopsis
- Species: P. hromadnikii

Binomial name
- Puya hromadnikii Rauh

= Puya hromadnikii =

Species of flowering plant

Puya hromadnikii is a species of the genus Puya.
