= Puya rusbyi =

Scientific classification
- Kingdom: Plantae
- Clade: Tracheophytes
- Clade: Angiosperms
- Clade: Monocots
- Clade: Commelinids
- Order: Poales
- Family: Bromeliaceae
- Genus: Puya
- Subgenus: Puya subg. Puyopsis
- Species: P. rusbyi

Binomial name
- Puya rusbyi (Baker) Mez

Synonyms
- Pitcairnia rusbyi Baker

Species of plant

Puya rusbyi is a species of flowering plant in the Bromeliaceae family. It is endemic to Bolivia.
