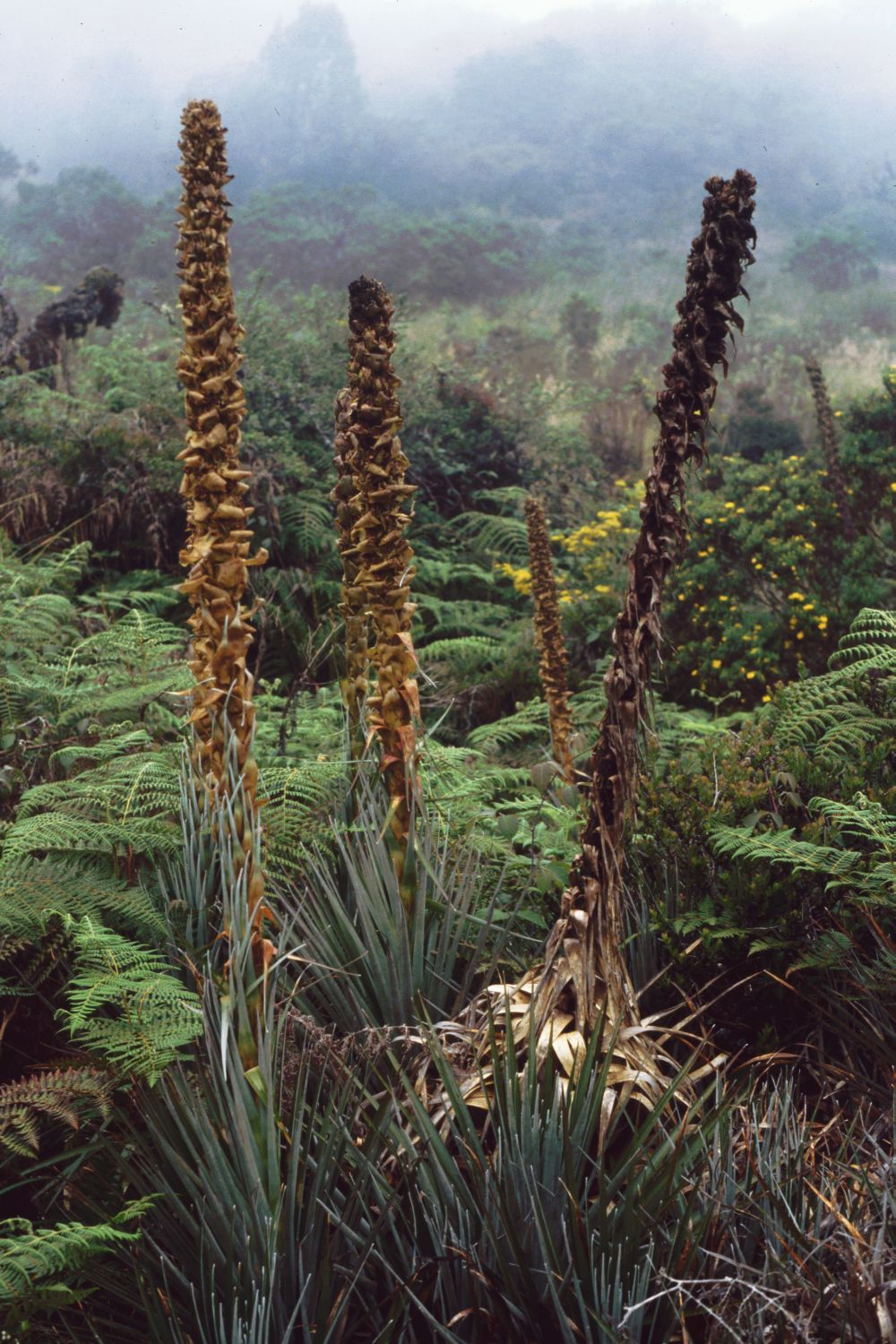
- Puya dasylirioides

Scientific classification
- Kingdom: Plantae
- Clade: Tracheophytes
- Clade: Angiosperms
- Clade: Monocots
- Clade: Commelinids
- Order: Poales
- Family: Bromeliaceae
- Genus: Puya
- Subgenus: Puya subg. Puyopsis
- Species: P. dasylirioides

Binomial name
- Puya dasylirioides Standley

= Puya dasylirioides =

Species of flowering plant

Puya dasylirioides is a species in the genus Puya. This species is native to Costa Rica. It is unusual for a Puya, as the leaves have no spines along the leaf margins. The flowers are blue with brown buds and the plants reach maturity at 4 to 5 years. Another feature that sets this species is that it grows in boggy areas at 3000 m that dry up seasonally.

== Cultivation ==
Puya dasylirioides occurs from 2300 to 3300 meter of elevation, where the climate is cool all year. It can tolerate temperatures of 30 °C, but it's possible that it won't thrive in consistently warmer conditions, especially if nights are warm. It is said to have tolerated winter lows of 19 °F (-7 °C), and might even handle colder temperatures. It grows well in a deep pot in normal cactus soil that contains no lime. Some protection from strong afternoon sun might be needed in warmer climates.
