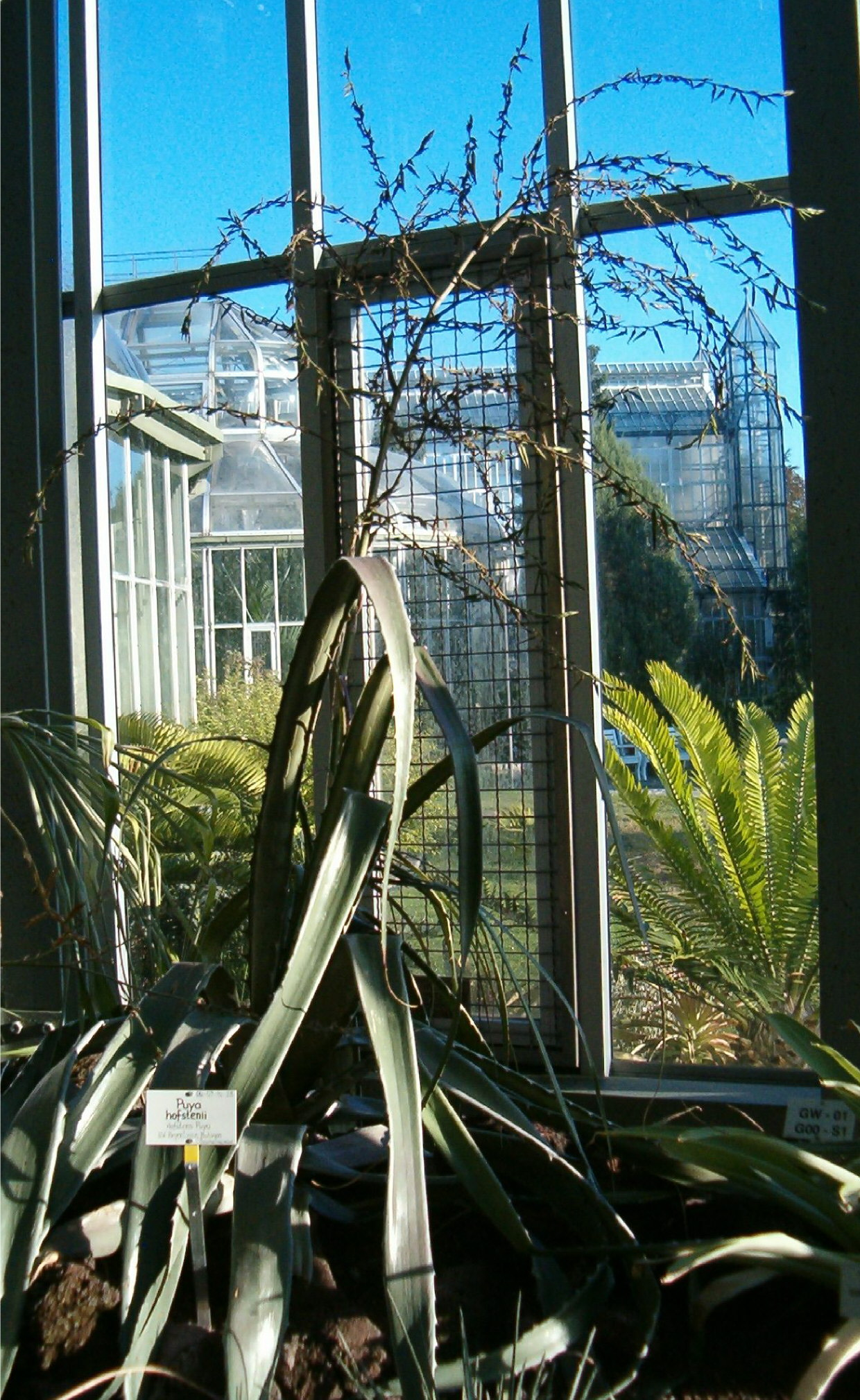
- Puya hofstenii in Berlin Botanical Gardens

Scientific classification
- Kingdom: Plantae
- Clade: Embryophytes
- Clade: Tracheophytes
- Clade: Spermatophytes
- Clade: Angiosperms
- Clade: Monocots
- Clade: Commelinids
- Order: Poales
- Family: Bromeliaceae
- Genus: Puya
- Subgenus: Puya subg. Puyopsis
- Species: P. hofstenii

Binomial name
- Puya hofstenii Mez

Synonyms
- Heterotypic Synonyms: Puya hauthalii Mez

= Puya hofstenii =

Species of flowering plant

Puya hofstenii is a species of flowering plant in the family Bromeliaceae. This species is native to Bolivia.
