= Puya killipii =

Scientific classification
- Kingdom: Plantae
- Clade: Tracheophytes
- Clade: Angiosperms
- Clade: Monocots
- Clade: Commelinids
- Order: Poales
- Family: Bromeliaceae
- Genus: Puya
- Subgenus: Puya subg. Puyopsis
- Species: P. killipii

Binomial name
- Puya killipii Cuatrecasas

Species of flowering plant

Puya killipii is a species in the genus Puya. This species is native to Venezuela. It is widely distributed in open rocky hillsides, at 3200-3300 m of altitude, on the northeastern side of Colombia and adjacent to Venezuela.
