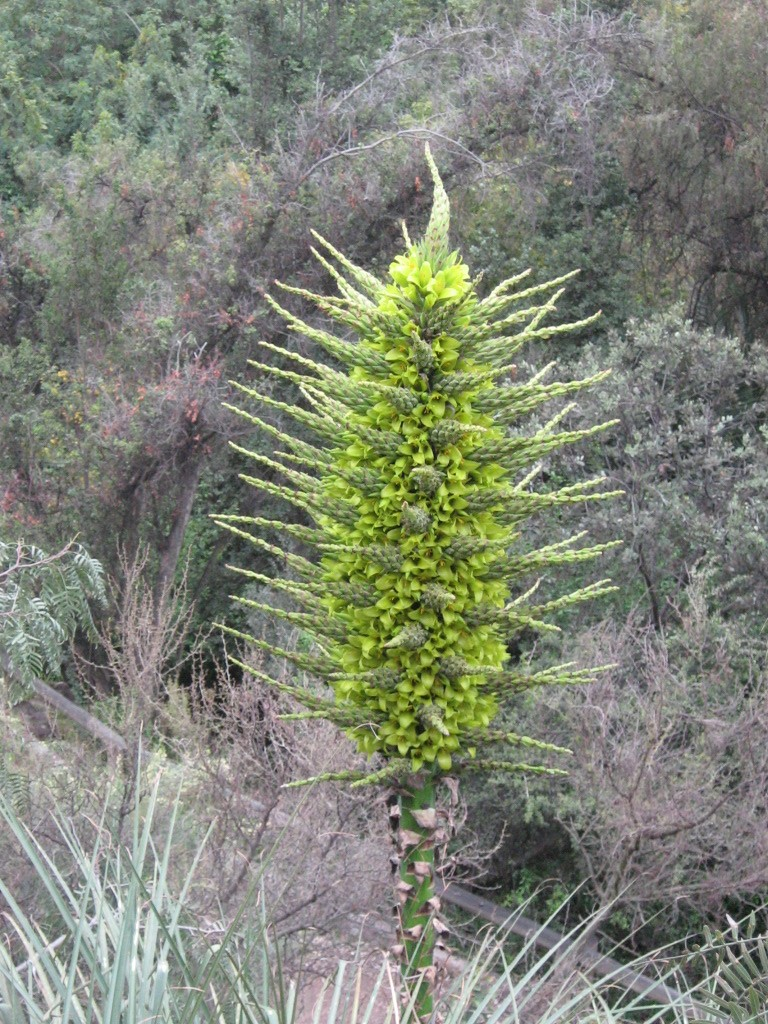
- Puya chilensis

Scientific classification
- Kingdom: Plantae
- Clade: Tracheophytes
- Clade: Angiosperms
- Clade: Monocots
- Clade: Commelinids
- Order: Poales
- Family: Bromeliaceae
- Subfamily: Puyoideae; Givnish
- Genus: Puya; Molina

Type species
- Puya chilensis

Species
- See text

Synonyms
- Pourretia Ruiz & Pav. 1794

= Puya (plant) =

Sole genus of the subfamily Puyoideae

Puya is a genus of the botanical family Bromeliaceae. It is the sole genus of the subfamily Puyoideae, and is composed of 226 species. These terrestrial plants are native to the Andes Mountains of South America and southern Central America. Many of the species are monocarpic, with the parent plant dying after one flower and seed production event.

The species Puya raimondii is notable as the largest species of bromeliad known, reaching 3 m tall in vegetative growth with a flower spike 9–10 m tall. The other species are also large, with the flower spikes mostly reaching 1–4 m tall.

The name Puya was derived from the Indigenous Mapuche word meaning "point".

== Taxonomy ==
The genus is commonly divided into two subgenera, Puya, containing eight species, and Puyopsis containing the remainder. The subgenera can be distinguished by the presence of a sterile inflorescence at the branch apex in Puya, which are fertile in Puyopsis.

=== Species ===
As of January 2023, Plants of the World Online accepted the following species:

| Subgenus | Image | Scientific name | Distribution |
|---|---|---|---|
| Puya | | Puya alpestris (Poepp.) Gay | Chile |
| Puya | | Puya × berteroniana Mez (P. alpestris subsp. zoellneri × P. venusta) | Chile |
| Puya | | Puya boliviensis Baker | Chile (Antofagasta) |
| Puya | | Puya castellanosii L.B.Sm. | Argentina (Salta) |
| Puya | | Puya chilensis Molina | Chile |
| Puya | | Puya gilmartiniae G.S.Varad. & A.R.Flores | Chile (Coquimbo) |
| Puya | | Puya raimondii Harms | Bolivia and Peru |
| Puya | | Puya weddelliana (Baker) Mez | Bolivia (Chuquisaca, Tarija) |
| Puyopsis (Baker) L.B. Sm. | | Puya adscendens L.B.Sm. | Peru |
| Puyopsis (Baker) L.B. Sm. | | Puya aequatorialis André | Ecuador |
| Puyopsis (Baker) L.B. Sm. | | Puya alata L.B.Sm. | Bolivia |
| Puyopsis (Baker) L.B. Sm. | | Puya alba L.B.Sm. | Bolivia (Tarija) |
| Puyopsis (Baker) L.B. Sm. | | Puya alpicola L.B.Sm. | Colombia (Sierra Nevada de Santa Marta) |
| Puyopsis (Baker) L.B. Sm. | | Puya angelensis E.Gross & Rauh | Ecuador |
| Puyopsis (Baker) L.B. Sm. | | Puya angulonis L.B.Sm. | Peru |
| Puyopsis (Baker) L.B. Sm. | | Puya angusta L.B.Sm. | Peru |
| Puyopsis (Baker) L.B. Sm. | | Puya antioquensis L.B.Sm. & Read | Colombia (Antioquia) |
| Puyopsis (Baker) L.B. Sm. | | Puya araneosa L.B.Sm. | Peru. |
| Puyopsis (Baker) L.B. Sm. | | Puya argentea L.B.Sm. | Peru (Ancash) |
| Puyopsis (Baker) L.B. Sm. | | Puya aristeguietae L.B.Sm. | Venezuela |
| Puyopsis (Baker) L.B. Sm. | | Puya assurgens L.B.Sm. | Argentina (Jujuy) |
| Puyopsis (Baker) L.B. Sm. | | Puya atra L.B.Sm. | Bolivia (Cochabamba) |
| Puyopsis (Baker) L.B. Sm. | | Puya barkleyana L.B.Sm. | Colombia (Santander) |
| Puyopsis (Baker) L.B. Sm. | | Puya bermejana S.E.Gómez, Slanis & A.Grau | Bolivia (Tarija) to Argentina (NW. Salta) |
| Puyopsis (Baker) L.B. Sm. | | Puya bicolor Mez | Colombia |
| Puyopsis (Baker) L.B. Sm. | | Puya boopiensis R.Vásquez, Ibisch & R.Lara | Bolivia |
| Puyopsis (Baker) L.B. Sm. | | Puya boyacana Cuatrec. | Colombia (Boyacá |
| Puyopsis (Baker) L.B. Sm. | | Puya brachystachya (Baker) Mez | Colombia (Sierra Nevada de Santa Marta) |
| Puyopsis (Baker) L.B. Sm. | | Puya brackeana Manzan. & W.Till | Ecuador |
| Puyopsis (Baker) L.B. Sm. | | Puya bravoi Aráoz & A.Grau | Argentina (Salta) |
| Puyopsis (Baker) L.B. Sm. | | Puya brittoniana Baker | Bolivia (La Paz) |
| Puyopsis (Baker) L.B. Sm. | | Puya cahuachensis A.Galán, J.Montoya, Vicente Orell. & E.Linares | Peru |
| Puyopsis (Baker) L.B. Sm. | | Puya cajasensis Manzan. & W.Till | Ecuador |
| Puyopsis (Baker) L.B. Sm. | | Puya cardenasii L.B.Sm. | Bolivia (Cochabamba) |
| Puyopsis (Baker) L.B. Sm. | | Puya cardonae L.B.Sm. | Venezuela (Táchira) |
| Puyopsis (Baker) L.B. Sm. | | Puya casmichensis L.B.Sm. | Peru (La Libertad) |
| Puyopsis (Baker) L.B. Sm. | | Puya cerrateana L.B.Sm. | Peru |
| Puyopsis (Baker) L.B. Sm. | | Puya claudiae Ibisch, R.Vásquez & E.Gross | Bolivia |
| Puyopsis (Baker) L.B. Sm. | | Puya clava-herculis Mez & Sodiro | Colombia, Ecuador |
| Puyopsis (Baker) L.B. Sm. | | Puya cleefii L.B.Sm. & Read | Colombia |
| Puyopsis (Baker) L.B. Sm. | | Puya cochabambensis R.Vásquez & Ibisch | Bolivia |
| Puyopsis (Baker) L.B. Sm. | | Puya coerulea Lindl. | Chile |
| Puyopsis (Baker) L.B. Sm. | | Puya colcaensis Treviño, Quip. & Gouda | Peru |
| Puyopsis (Baker) L.B. Sm. | | Puya commixta L.B.Sm. | Peru (Puno) |
| Puyopsis (Baker) L.B. Sm. | | Puya compacta L.B.Sm. | Ecuador |
| Puyopsis (Baker) L.B. Sm. | | Puya coriacea L.B.Sm. | Peru (La Libertad) |
| Puyopsis (Baker) L.B. Sm. | | Puya cristata L.B.Sm. | Bolivia (Cochabamba) |
| Puyopsis (Baker) L.B. Sm. | | Puya cryptantha Cuatrec. | Colombia |
| Puyopsis (Baker) L.B. Sm. | | Puya ctenorhyncha L.B.Sm. | Bolivia (La Paz) |
| Puyopsis (Baker) L.B. Sm. | | Puya cuatrecasasii L.B.Sm. | Colombia |
| Puyopsis (Baker) L.B. Sm. | | Puya cuevae Manzan. & W.Till | Ecuador |
| Puyopsis (Baker) L.B. Sm. | | Puya cylindrica Mez | Peru |
| Puyopsis (Baker) L.B. Sm. | | Puya dasylirioides Standl. | Costa Rica |
| Puyopsis (Baker) L.B. Sm. | | Puya densiflora Harms | Peru |
| Puyopsis (Baker) L.B. Sm. | | Puya depauperata L.B.Sm. | Peru (Junín) |
| Puyopsis (Baker) L.B. Sm. | | Puya dichroa L.B.Sm. & Read | Colombia |
| Puyopsis (Baker) L.B. Sm. | | Puya dodsonii Manzan. & W.Till | Ecuador |
| Puyopsis (Baker) L.B. Sm. | | Puya dolichostrobila Harms | Peru (La Libertad) |
| Puyopsis (Baker) L.B. Sm. | | Puya donneriana R.Vásquez, Altam. & Ibisch | Bolivia |
| Puyopsis (Baker) L.B. Sm. | | Puya dyckioides (Baker) Mez | Argentina, Bolivia |
| Puyopsis (Baker) L.B. Sm. | | Puya elviragrossiae R.Vásquez & Ibisch | Bolivia |
| Puyopsis (Baker) L.B. Sm. | | Puya entre-riosensis Ibisch & E.Gross | Bolivia |
| Puyopsis (Baker) L.B. Sm. | | Puya erlenbachiana Ibisch & R.Vásquez | Bolivia (Tarija) |
| Puyopsis (Baker) L.B. Sm. | | Puya eryngioides André | Ecuador |
| Puyopsis (Baker) L.B. Sm. | | Puya exigua Mez | Ecuador (Azuay) |
| Puyopsis (Baker) L.B. Sm. | | Puya exuta L.B.Sm. & Read | Columbia |
| Puyopsis (Baker) L.B. Sm. | | Puya fastuosa Mez | Peru (Cajamarca) |
| Puyopsis (Baker) L.B. Sm. | | Puya ferox Mez | Peru (Puno) |
| Puyopsis (Baker) L.B. Sm. | | Puya ferreyrae L.B.Sm. | Peru (La Libertad) |
| Puyopsis (Baker) L.B. Sm. | | Puya ferruginea (Ruiz & Pav.)L.B.Sm. | Bolivia, Ecuador, Peru |
| Puyopsis (Baker) L.B. Sm. | | Puya fiebrigii Mez | Bolivia |
| Puyopsis (Baker) L.B. Sm. | | Puya floccosa (Linden) É.Morren ex Mez | Brazil, Colombia, Costa Rica, Venezuela |
| Puyopsis (Baker) L.B. Sm. | | Puya fosteriana L.B.Sm. | Bolivia (La Paz) |
| Puyopsis (Baker) L.B. Sm. | | Puya fulgens L.B.Sm. | Peru (Amazonas) |
| Puyopsis (Baker) L.B. Sm. | | Puya furfuracea (Willd.)L.B.Sm. | Colombia (Valle del Cauca) |
| Puyopsis (Baker) L.B. Sm. | | Puya gargantae L.B.Sm. | Colombia (Norte de Santander) |
| Puyopsis (Baker) L.B. Sm. | | Puya gerd-muelleri W.Weber | Peru (Cajamarca) |
| Puyopsis (Baker) L.B. Sm. | | Puya gerdae W.Weber | Peru (Lima) |
| Puyopsis (Baker) L.B. Sm. | | Puya gigas André | Colombia |
| Puyopsis (Baker) L.B. Sm. | | Puya glabrescens L.B.Sm. | Bolivia (Cochabamba) |
| Puyopsis (Baker) L.B. Sm. | | Puya glandulosa L.B.Sm. | Peru (La Libertad) |
| Puyopsis (Baker) L.B. Sm. | | Puya glareosa L.B.Sm. | Bolivia (La Paz) |
| Puyopsis (Baker) L.B. Sm. | | Puya glaucovirens Mez | Peru |
| Puyopsis (Baker) L.B. Sm. | | Puya glomerifera Mez & Sodiro | Ecuador |
| Puyopsis (Baker) L.B. Sm. | | Puya goudotiana Mez | Colombia |
| Puyopsis (Baker) L.B. Sm. | | Puya gracilis L.B.Sm. | Peru |
| Puyopsis (Baker) L.B. Sm. | | Puya grafii Rauh | Venezuela (Amazonas) |
| Puyopsis (Baker) L.B. Sm. | | Puya grandidens Mez | Peru (Ancash) |
| Puyopsis (Baker) L.B. Sm. | | Puya grantii L.B.Sm. | Colombia |
| Puyopsis (Baker) L.B. Sm. | | Puya grubbii L.B.Sm. | Colombia (Boyacá) |
| Puyopsis (Baker) L.B. Sm. | | Puya guaramacalana Stergios, Caracas, Dorr & S.M.Niño | Venezuela (Trujillo) |
| Puyopsis (Baker) L.B. Sm. | | Puya gutteana W.Weber | Peru (Cusco) |
| Puyopsis (Baker) L.B. Sm. | | Puya hamata L.B.Sm. | Colombia, Ecuador, Peru |
| Puyopsis (Baker) L.B. Sm. | | Puya harmsii (A.Cast.) A.Cast. | Argentina |
| Puyopsis (Baker) L.B. Sm. | | Puya harry-lutheri Gouda | Venezuela |
| Puyopsis (Baker) L.B. Sm. | | Puya herrerae Harms | Peru |
| Puyopsis (Baker) L.B. Sm. | | Puya herzogii Wittm. | Bolivia (Cochabamba) |
| Puyopsis (Baker) L.B. Sm. | | Puya hirtzii Manzan. & W.Till | Ecuador |
| Puyopsis (Baker) L.B. Sm. | | Puya hofstenii Mez | Bolivia to Argentina (Jujuy) |
| Puyopsis (Baker) L.B. Sm. | | Puya horrida L.B.Sm. & Read | Colombia |
| Puyopsis (Baker) L.B. Sm. | | Puya hortensis L.B.Sm. | Peru (Huancavelica) |
| Puyopsis (Baker) L.B. Sm. | | Puya hoxeyi Janeba | Peru |
| Puyopsis (Baker) L.B. Sm. | | Puya hromadnikii Rauh | Bolivia |
| Puyopsis (Baker) L.B. Sm. | | Puya huancavelicae L.B.Sm. | Peru (Huancavelica) |
| Puyopsis (Baker) L.B. Sm. | | Puya humilis Mez | Bolivia |
| Puyopsis (Baker) L.B. Sm. | | Puya hutchisonii L.B.Sm. | Peru (Ancash) |
| Puyopsis (Baker) L.B. Sm. | | Puya ibischii R.Vásquez | Bolivia (Cochabamba) |
| Puyopsis (Baker) L.B. Sm. | | Puya iltisiana L.B.Sm. | Peru (Apurímac) |
| Puyopsis (Baker) L.B. Sm. | | Puya isabellina Mez | Peru (Cajamarca) |
| Puyopsis (Baker) L.B. Sm. | | Puya joergensenii H.Luther | Ecuador |
| Puyopsis (Baker) L.B. Sm. | | Puya killipii Cuatrec. | Colombia, Venezuela |
| Puyopsis (Baker) L.B. Sm. | | Puya kuntzeana Mez | Bolivia (Cochabamba) |
| Puyopsis (Baker) L.B. Sm. | | Puya laccata Mez | Peru (Huánuco) |
| Puyopsis (Baker) L.B. Sm. | | Puya lanata (Kunth) Schult. & Schult.f. | Ecuador, Peru |
| Puyopsis (Baker) L.B. Sm. | | Puya lanuginosa (Ruiz & Pav.) Schult. & Schult.f. | Peru |
| Puyopsis (Baker) L.B. Sm. | | Puya larae R.Vásquez & Ibisch | Bolivia |
| Puyopsis (Baker) L.B. Sm. | | Puya lasiopoda L.B.Sm. | Bolivia, Peru |
| Puyopsis (Baker) L.B. Sm. | | Puya laxa L.B.Sm. | Bolivia (Santa Cruz) |
| Puyopsis (Baker) L.B. Sm. | | Puya lehmanniana L.B.Sm. | Colombia |
| Puyopsis (Baker) L.B. Sm. | | Puya leptostachya L.B.Sm. | Peru (Cusco) to Bolivia |
| Puyopsis (Baker) L.B. Sm. | | Puya lilloi A.Cast. | Argentina |
| Puyopsis (Baker) L.B. Sm. | | Puya lineata Mez | Colombia |
| Puyopsis (Baker) L.B. Sm. | | Puya llatensis L.B.Sm. | Peru (Huánuco) |
| Puyopsis (Baker) L.B. Sm. | | Puya loca Madriñán | Colombia (Cundinamarca) |
| Puyopsis (Baker) L.B. Sm. | | Puya lokischmidtiae R.Vásquez & Ibisch | Bolivia (Tarija) |
| Puyopsis (Baker) L.B. Sm. | | Puya longisepala Mez | Peru (Puno) |
| Puyopsis (Baker) L.B. Sm. | | Puya longispina Manzan. & W.Till | Ecuador |
| Puyopsis (Baker) L.B. Sm. | | Puya longistyla Mez | Peru (Cusco) |
| Puyopsis (Baker) L.B. Sm. | | Puya lopezii L.B.Sm. | Peru (La Libertad) |
| Puyopsis (Baker) L.B. Sm. | | Puya lutheri W.Till | Peru (Ancash) |
| Puyopsis (Baker) L.B. Sm. | | Puya macbridei L.B.Sm. | Peru (Ancash) |
| Puyopsis (Baker) L.B. Sm. | | Puya macropoda L.B.Sm. | Peru (Amazonas) |
| Puyopsis (Baker) L.B. Sm. | | Puya macrura Mez | Peru |
| Puyopsis (Baker) L.B. Sm. | | Puya maculata L.B.Sm. | Ecuador |
| Puyopsis (Baker) L.B. Sm. | | Puya mariae L.B.Sm. | Peru (Amazonas) |
| Puyopsis (Baker) L.B. Sm. | | Puya medica L.B.Sm. | Peru |
| Puyopsis (Baker) L.B. Sm. | | Puya membranacea L.B.Sm. | Peru (Cusco) |
| Puyopsis (Baker) L.B. Sm. | | Puya meziana Wittm. | Bolivia (La Paz) |
| Puyopsis (Baker) L.B. Sm. | | Puya micrantha Mez | Argentina (Jujuy, Salta), Bolivia |
| Puyopsis (Baker) L.B. Sm. | | Puya mima L.B.Sm. & Read | Peru (Cajamarca) |
| Puyopsis (Baker) L.B. Sm. | | Puya minima L.B.Sm. | Bolivia (Tarija) |
| Puyopsis (Baker) L.B. Sm. | | Puya mirabilis (Mez)L.B.Sm. | Argentina, Bolivia |
| Puyopsis (Baker) L.B. Sm. | | Puya mitis Mez | Peru |
| Puyopsis (Baker) L.B. Sm. | | Puya mollis Baker ex Mez | Bolivia (La Paz) |
| Puyopsis (Baker) L.B. Sm. | | Puya mucronata Manzan. | Peru |
| Puyopsis (Baker) L.B. Sm. | | Puya nana Wittm. | Bolivia (Santa Cruz) |
| Puyopsis (Baker) L.B. Sm. | | Puya navarroana Manzan. & W.Till | Ecuador |
| Puyopsis (Baker) L.B. Sm. | | Puya nigrescens L.B.Sm. | Peru (Ancash) |
| Puyopsis (Baker) L.B. Sm. | | Puya nitida Mez | Colombia |
| Puyopsis (Baker) L.B. Sm. | | Puya nivalis Baker | Colombia (Sierra Nevada de Santa Marta) |
| Puyopsis (Baker) L.B. Sm. | | Puya novarae G.S.Varad. ex Gómez Rom. & A.Grau | Argentina (Salta) |
| Puyopsis (Baker) L.B. Sm. | | Puya nutans L.B.Sm. | Ecuador |
| Puyopsis (Baker) L.B. Sm. | | Puya obconica L.B.Sm. | Ecuador |
| Puyopsis (Baker) L.B. Sm. | | Puya occidentalis L.B.Sm. | Colombia (Valle del Cauca) |
| Puyopsis (Baker) L.B. Sm. | | Puya ochroleuca Betancur & Callejas | Colombia (Antioquia) |
| Puyopsis (Baker) L.B. Sm. | | Puya olivacea Wittm. | Bolivia (Santa Cruz) |
| Puyopsis (Baker) L.B. Sm. | | Puya oxyantha Mez | Peru (Puno) |
| Puyopsis (Baker) L.B. Sm. | | Puya pachyphylla R.Vásquez & Ibisch | Bolivia (Santa Cruz) |
| Puyopsis (Baker) L.B. Sm. | | Puya parviflora L.B.Sm. | Ecuador |
| Puyopsis (Baker) L.B. Sm. | | Puya pattersoniae Manzan. & W.Till | Ecuador |
| Puyopsis (Baker) L.B. Sm. | | Puya paupera Mez | Bolivia (Tarija) |
| Puyopsis (Baker) L.B. Sm. | | Puya pearcei (Baker) Mez | Bolivia. |
| Puyopsis (Baker) L.B. Sm. | | Puya penduliflora L.B.Sm. | Bolivia (La Paz) |
| Puyopsis (Baker) L.B. Sm. | | Puya pichinchae Mez & Sodiro | Ecuador (Pichincha) |
| Puyopsis (Baker) L.B. Sm. | | Puya pitcairnioides L.B.Sm. | Peru (Amazonas) |
| Puyopsis (Baker) L.B. Sm. | | Puya pizarroana R.Vásquez, Ibisch & S.Beck | Bolivia |
| Puyopsis (Baker) L.B. Sm. | | Puya ponderosa L.B.Sm. | Peru (Ayacucho) |
| Puyopsis (Baker) L.B. Sm. | | Puya potosina L.B.Sm. | Bolivia |
| Puyopsis (Baker) L.B. Sm. | | Puya pratensis L.B.Sm. | Peru |
| Puyopsis (Baker) L.B. Sm. | | Puya prosanae Ibisch & E.Gross | Bolivia |
| Puyopsis (Baker) L.B. Sm. | | Puya pseudoeryngioides H.Luther | Peru |
| Puyopsis (Baker) L.B. Sm. | | Puya pusilla H.Luther | Bolivia |
| Puyopsis (Baker) L.B. Sm. | | Puya pygmaea L.B.Sm. | Ecuador |
| Puyopsis (Baker) L.B. Sm. | | Puya pyramidata (Ruiz & Pav.) Schult. & Schult.f. | Peru |
| Puyopsis (Baker) L.B. Sm. | | Puya ramonii L.B.Sm. | Peru (Lambayeque) |
| Puyopsis (Baker) L.B. Sm. | | Puya ramosissima ined. | Peru (Amazonas) |
| Puyopsis (Baker) L.B. Sm. | | Puya rauhii L.B.Sm. | Peru (Ancash) |
| Puyopsis (Baker) L.B. Sm. | | Puya reducta L.B.Sm. | Bolivia (La Paz) |
| Puyopsis (Baker) L.B. Sm. | | Puya reflexiflora Mez | Peru (Ancash) |
| Puyopsis (Baker) L.B. Sm. | | Puya retrorsa Gilmartin | Ecuador |
| Puyopsis (Baker) L.B. Sm. | | Puya riparia L.B.Sm. | Bolivia (La Paz) |
| Puyopsis (Baker) L.B. Sm. | | Puya robin-fosteri G.S.Varad. & H.Luther | Peru |
| Puyopsis (Baker) L.B. Sm. | | Puya roezlii É.Morren | Peru |
| Puyopsis (Baker) L.B. Sm. | | Puya roldanii Betancur & Callejas | Colombia (Antioquia) |
| Puyopsis (Baker) L.B. Sm. | | Puya roseana L.B.Sm. | Ecuador (Loja) |
| Puyopsis (Baker) L.B. Sm. | | Puya rusbyi (Baker) Mez | Bolivia (La Paz) |
| Puyopsis (Baker) L.B. Sm. | | Puya sagasteguii L.B.Sm. | Peru (La Libertad) |
| Puyopsis (Baker) L.B. Sm. | | Puya sanctae-crucis (Baker)L.B.Sm. | Bolivia (Santa Cruz) |
| Puyopsis (Baker) L.B. Sm. | | Puya sanctae-martae L.B.Sm. | Colombia |
| Puyopsis (Baker) L.B. Sm. | | Puya santanderensis Cuatrec. | Colombia (Santander) |
| Puyopsis (Baker) L.B. Sm. | | Puya santosii Cuatrec. | Colombia (Cundinamarca) |
| Puyopsis (Baker) L.B. Sm. | | Puya secunda L.B.Sm. | Bolivia |
| Puyopsis (Baker) L.B. Sm. | | Puya sehuencasensis R.Vásquez, Ibisch & R.Lara | Bolivia (Cochabamba) |
| Puyopsis (Baker) L.B. Sm. | | Puya serranoensis Rauh | Bolivia |
| Puyopsis (Baker) L.B. Sm. | | Puya silvae-baccae L.B.Sm. & Read | Venezuela (Zulia) |
| Puyopsis (Baker) L.B. Sm. | | Puya simulans L.B.Sm. | Peru (La Libertad) |
| Puyopsis (Baker) L.B. Sm. | | Puya smithii A.Cast. | Argentina |
| Puyopsis (Baker) L.B. Sm. | | Puya sodiroana Mez | Ecuador |
| Puyopsis (Baker) L.B. Sm. | | Puya solomonii G.S.Varad. | Bolivia |
| Puyopsis (Baker) L.B. Sm. | | Puya spathacea (Griseb.) Mez | Argentina, Bolivia |
| Puyopsis (Baker) L.B. Sm. | | Puya stenothyrsa (Baker) Mez | Bolivia |
| Puyopsis (Baker) L.B. Sm. | | Puya stipitata L.B.Sm. | Peru (Huánuco) |
| Puyopsis (Baker) L.B. Sm. | | Puya strobilantha Mez | Peru (Junín) |
| Puyopsis (Baker) L.B. Sm. | | Puya textoragicolae W.Weber | Peru (Puno) |
| Puyopsis (Baker) L.B. Sm. | | Puya thomasiana André | Colombia to Ecuador |
| Puyopsis (Baker) L.B. Sm. | | Puya tillii Manzan. | Ecuador |
| Puyopsis (Baker) L.B. Sm. | | Puya tovariana L.B.Sm. | Peru (Lima) |
| Puyopsis (Baker) L.B. Sm. | | Puya trianae Baker | Venezuela to Ecuador |
| Puyopsis (Baker) L.B. Sm. | | Puya tristis L.B.Sm. | Bolivia (Cochabamba) |
| Puyopsis (Baker) L.B. Sm. | | Puya trollii L.B.Sm. | Bolivia |
| Puyopsis (Baker) L.B. Sm. | | Puya tuberosa Mez | Bolivia |
| Puyopsis (Baker) L.B. Sm. | | Puya tunarensis Mez | Bolivia (Cochabamba) |
| Puyopsis (Baker) L.B. Sm. | | Puya tyleriana Sagást., Zapata & M.O.Dillon | Peru (Ancash) |
| Puyopsis (Baker) L.B. Sm. | | Puya ugentiana L.B.Sm. | Bolivia (Chuquisaca) |
| Puyopsis (Baker) L.B. Sm. | | Puya ultima L.B.Sm. | Bolivia |
| Puyopsis (Baker) L.B. Sm. | | Puya valida L.B.Sm. | Bolivia (Chuquisaca) |
| Puyopsis (Baker) L.B. Sm. | | Puya vallo-grandensis Rauh | Bolivia |
| Puyopsis (Baker) L.B. Sm. | | Puya vargasiana L.B.Sm. | Peru (Cusco) |
| Puyopsis (Baker) L.B. Sm. | | Puya vasquezii Ibisch & E.Gross | Bolivia |
| Puyopsis (Baker) L.B. Sm. | | Puya venezuelana L.B.Sm. | Colombia, Venezuela |
| Puyopsis (Baker) L.B. Sm. | | Puya venusta (Baker) Phil. | Chile |
| Puyopsis (Baker) L.B. Sm. | | Puya vervoorstii Gómez Rom. & A.Grau | Argentina (San Juan) |
| Puyopsis (Baker) L.B. Sm. | | Puya vestita André | Colombia to Ecuador (Pichincha) |
| Puyopsis (Baker) L.B. Sm. | | Puya volcanensis A.Cast. | Argentina (Jujuy, Salta) |
| Puyopsis (Baker) L.B. Sm. | | Puya weberbaueri Mez | Bolivia, Peru |
| Puyopsis (Baker) L.B. Sm. | | Puya weberiana É.Morren ex Mez | Argentina (Salta, Tucumán) |
| Puyopsis (Baker) L.B. Sm. | | Puya werneriana Read & L.B.Sm. | Peru (Junín) |
| Puyopsis (Baker) L.B. Sm. | | Puya westii L.B.Sm. | Ecuador (Loja) to Peru |
| Puyopsis (Baker) L.B. Sm. | | Puya wrightii L.B.Sm. | Peru |
| Puyopsis (Baker) L.B. Sm. | | Puya wurdackii L.B.Sm. | Peru (Amazonas) |
| Puyopsis (Baker) L.B. Sm. | | Puya yakespala A.Cast. | Argentina (Salta) |

== Cultivation and use ==
Some species of Puya in Chile, locally known as chagual, are used to make salads from the base of its young leaves or stem. A common species is Puya chilensis.
