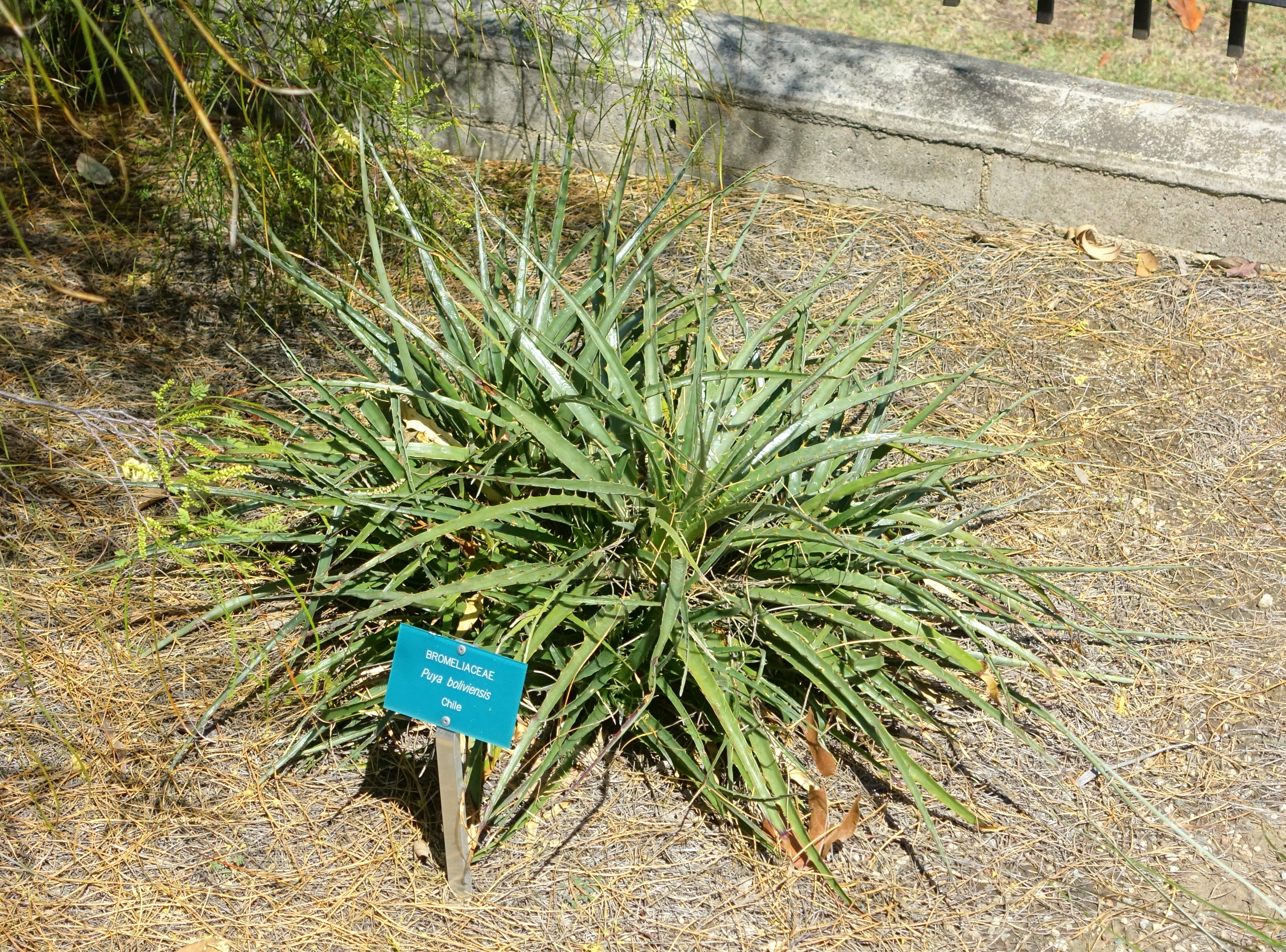

Scientific classification
- Kingdom: Plantae
- Clade: Tracheophytes
- Clade: Angiosperms
- Clade: Monocots
- Clade: Commelinids
- Order: Poales
- Family: Bromeliaceae
- Genus: Puya
- Species: P. boliviensis

Binomial name
- Puya boliviensis Baker

= Puya boliviensis =

Species of plant

Puya boliviensis is a species of flowering plant in the Bromeliaceae family. This species is endemic to Chile.
