= Puya spathacea =

Scientific classification
- Kingdom: Plantae
- Clade: Tracheophytes
- Clade: Angiosperms
- Clade: Monocots
- Clade: Commelinids
- Order: Poales
- Family: Bromeliaceae
- Genus: Puya
- Subgenus: Puya subg. Puyopsis
- Species: P. spathacea

Binomial name
- Puya spathacea (Griseb.) Mez

Synonyms
- Pitcairnia spathacea Griseb.; Puya formosa Speg.

Species of flowering plant

Puya spathacea is a species of flowering plant in the family Bromeliaceae. This species is native to Bolivia.

== Cultivars ==
- Puya 'Doris Coleman'
