= Puya meziana =

Scientific classification
- Kingdom: Plantae
- Clade: Tracheophytes
- Clade: Angiosperms
- Clade: Monocots
- Clade: Commelinids
- Order: Poales
- Family: Bromeliaceae
- Genus: Puya
- Subgenus: Puya subg. Puyopsis
- Species: P. meziana

Binomial name
- Puya meziana Wittmack

Species of plant

Puya meziana is a species in the genus Puya. This species is endemic to Bolivia.
