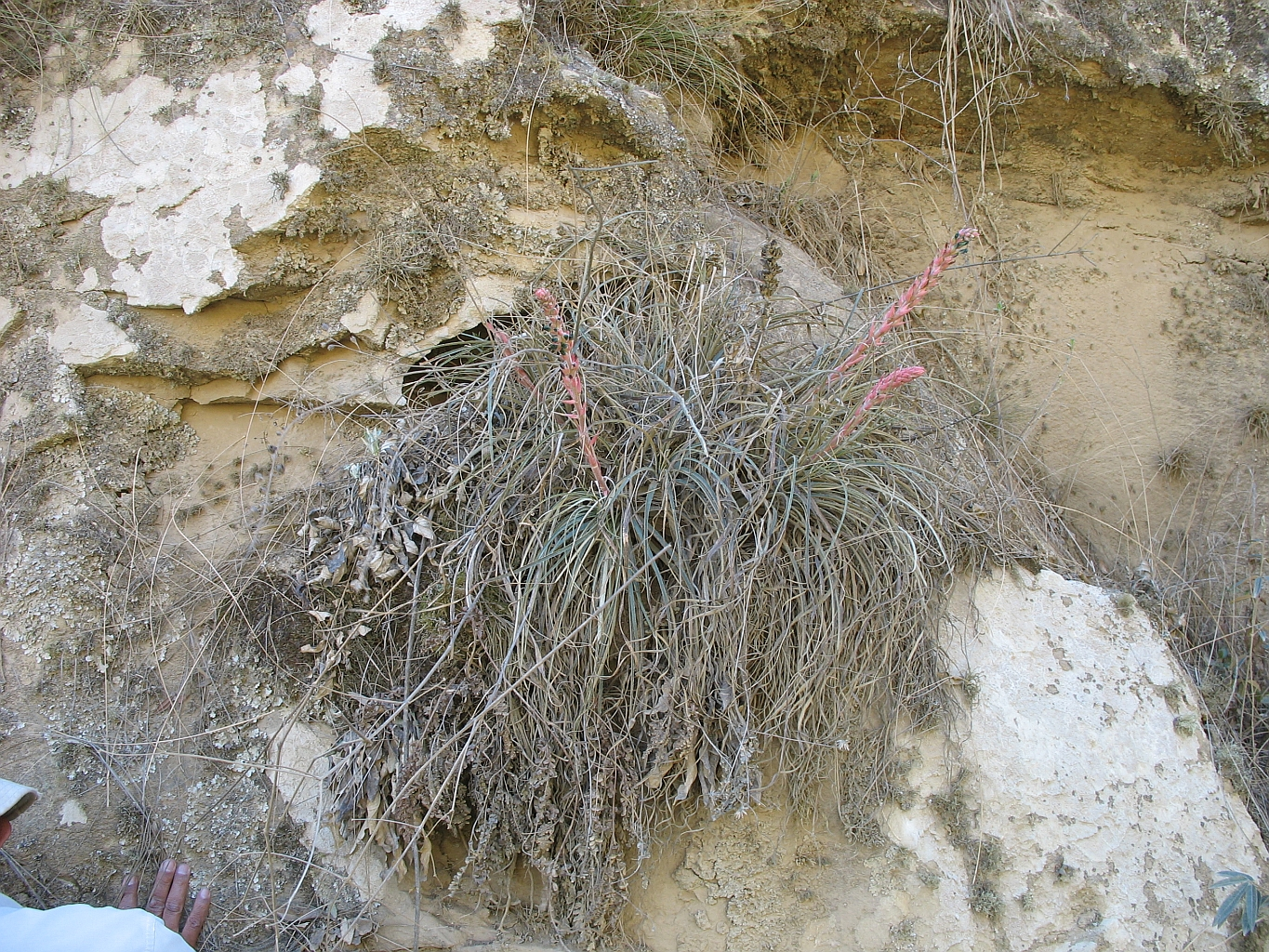

Scientific classification
- Kingdom: Plantae
- Clade: Embryophytes
- Clade: Tracheophytes
- Clade: Spermatophytes
- Clade: Angiosperms
- Clade: Monocots
- Clade: Commelinids
- Order: Poales
- Family: Bromeliaceae
- Genus: Puya
- Subgenus: Puya subg. Puyopsis
- Species: P. tuberosa

Binomial name
- Puya tuberosa Mez

= Puya tuberosa =

Species of flowering plant

Puya tuberosa is a species of flowering plant in the family Bromeliaceae. This species is endemic to Bolivia.

== Cultivars ==
- Puya 'Poseidon's Trident'
