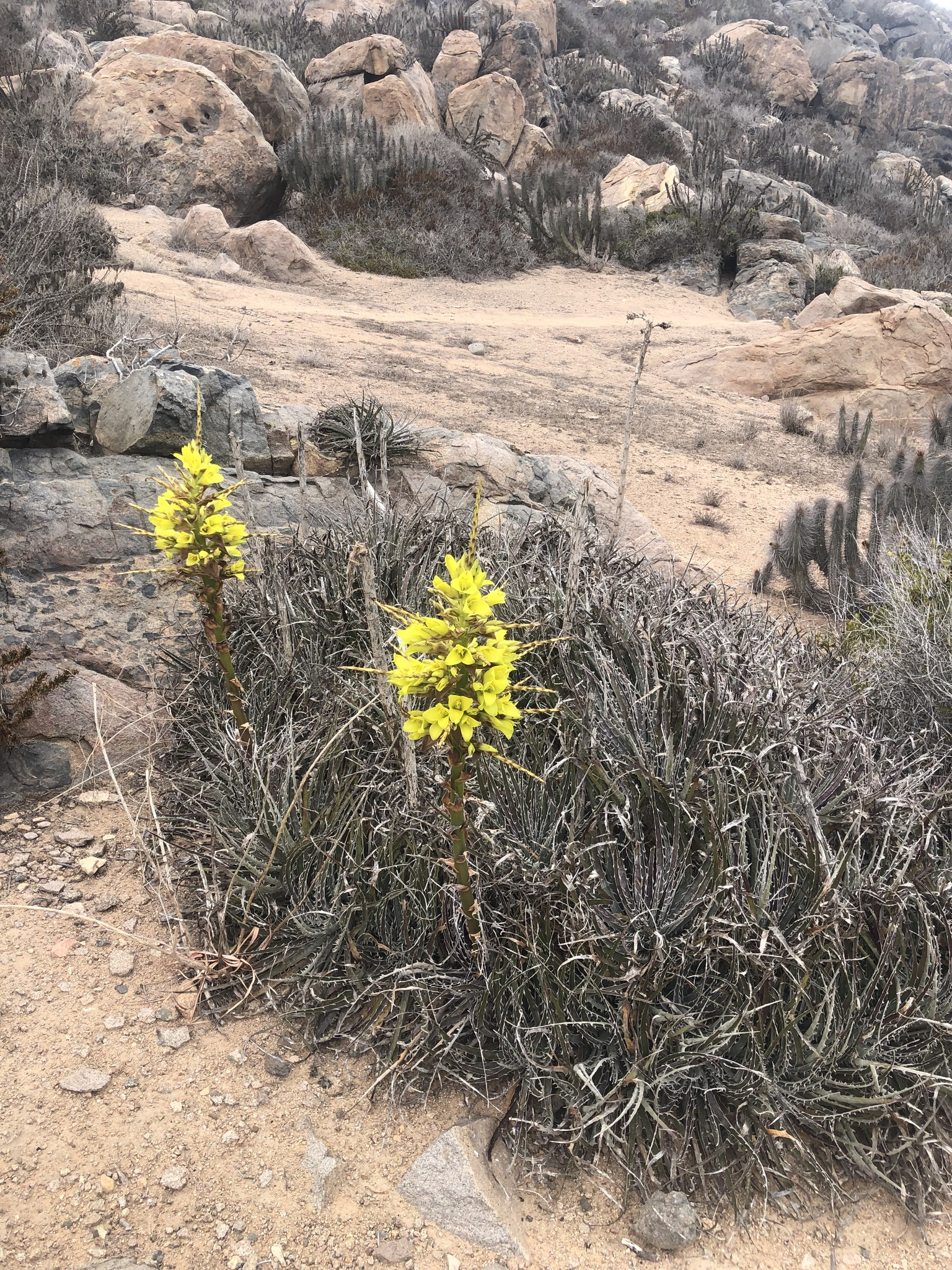

Scientific classification
- Kingdom: Plantae
- Clade: Tracheophytes
- Clade: Angiosperms
- Clade: Monocots
- Clade: Commelinids
- Order: Poales
- Family: Bromeliaceae
- Genus: Puya
- Species: P. gilmartiniae

Binomial name
- Puya gilmartiniae G.S. Varadarajan & Flores

= Puya gilmartiniae =

Species of plant

Puya gilmartiniae is a species in the genus Puya. This species is endemic to Chile.
