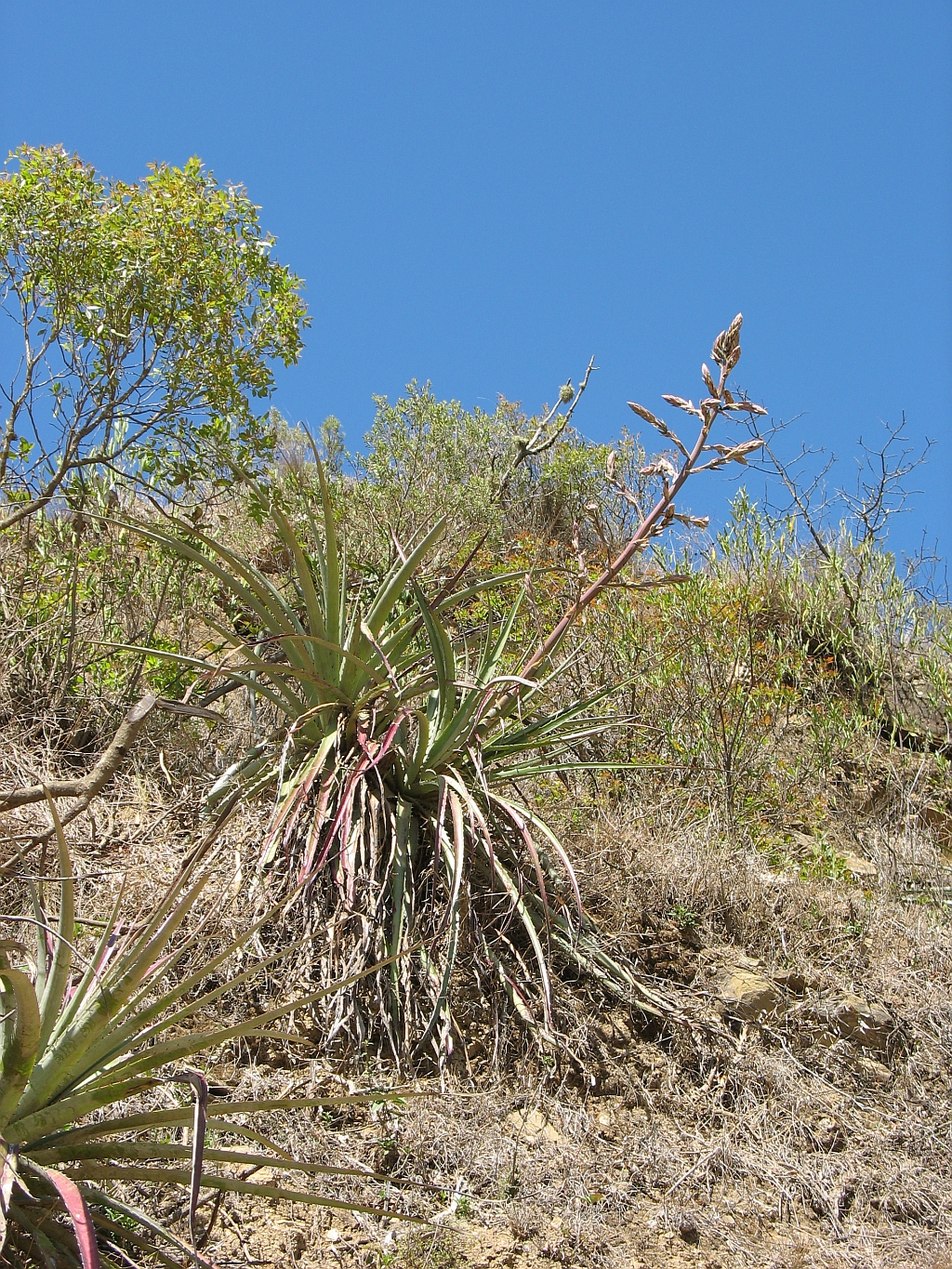

Scientific classification
- Kingdom: Plantae
- Clade: Tracheophytes
- Clade: Angiosperms
- Clade: Monocots
- Clade: Commelinids
- Order: Poales
- Family: Bromeliaceae
- Genus: Puya
- Species: P. claudiae

Binomial name
- Puya claudiae Ibisch, R. Vásquez & E. Gross

= Puya claudiae =

Species of flowering plant

Puya claudiae is a species of plant in the genus Puya. This species is endemic to Bolivia.
