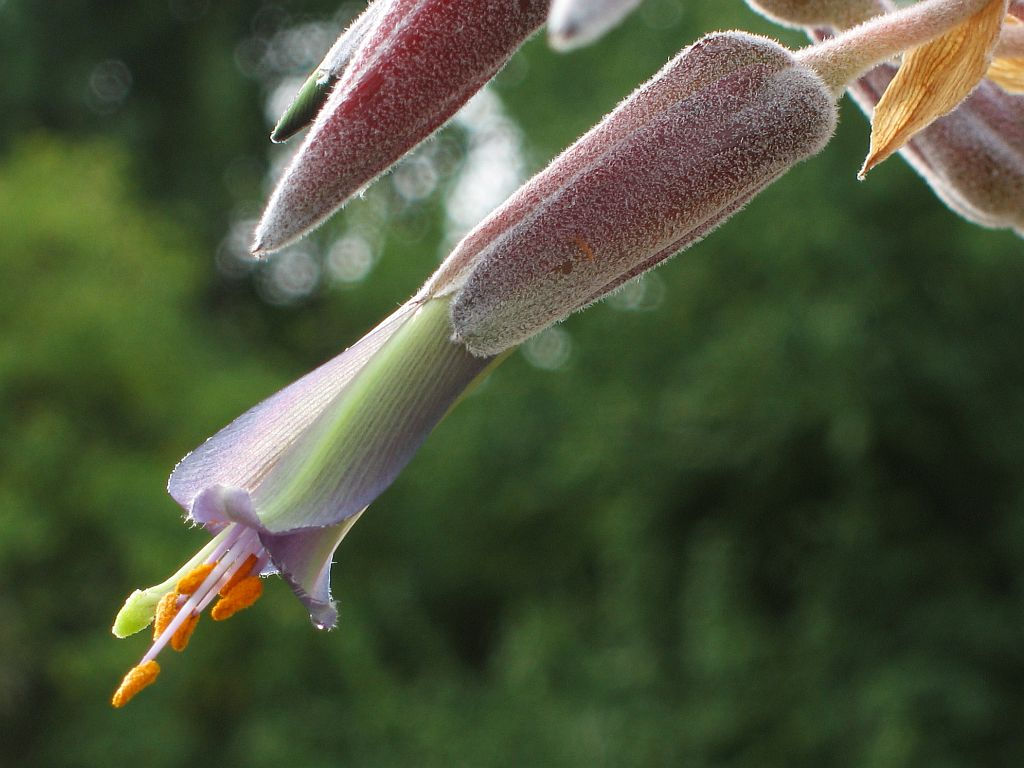

Scientific classification
- Kingdom: Plantae
- Clade: Tracheophytes
- Clade: Angiosperms
- Clade: Monocots
- Clade: Commelinids
- Order: Poales
- Family: Bromeliaceae
- Genus: Puya
- Subgenus: Puya subg. Puyopsis
- Species: P. sanctae-crucis

Binomial name
- Puya sanctae-crucis (Baker) L.B.Sm.

Synonyms
- Pitcairnia robusta Rusby; Pitcairnia sanctae-crucis Baker

= Puya sanctae-crucis =

Species of plant

Puya sanctae-crucis is a species of flowering plant in the Bromeliaceae family. It is endemic to Bolivia.
