= Puya weddelliana =

Scientific classification
- Kingdom: Plantae
- Clade: Tracheophytes
- Clade: Angiosperms
- Clade: Monocots
- Clade: Commelinids
- Order: Poales
- Family: Bromeliaceae
- Genus: Puya
- Species: P. weddelliana

Binomial name
- Puya weddelliana (Baker) Mez

Species of plant

Puya weddelliana is a species of flowering plant in the Bromeliaceae family. It is endemic to Bolivia.
