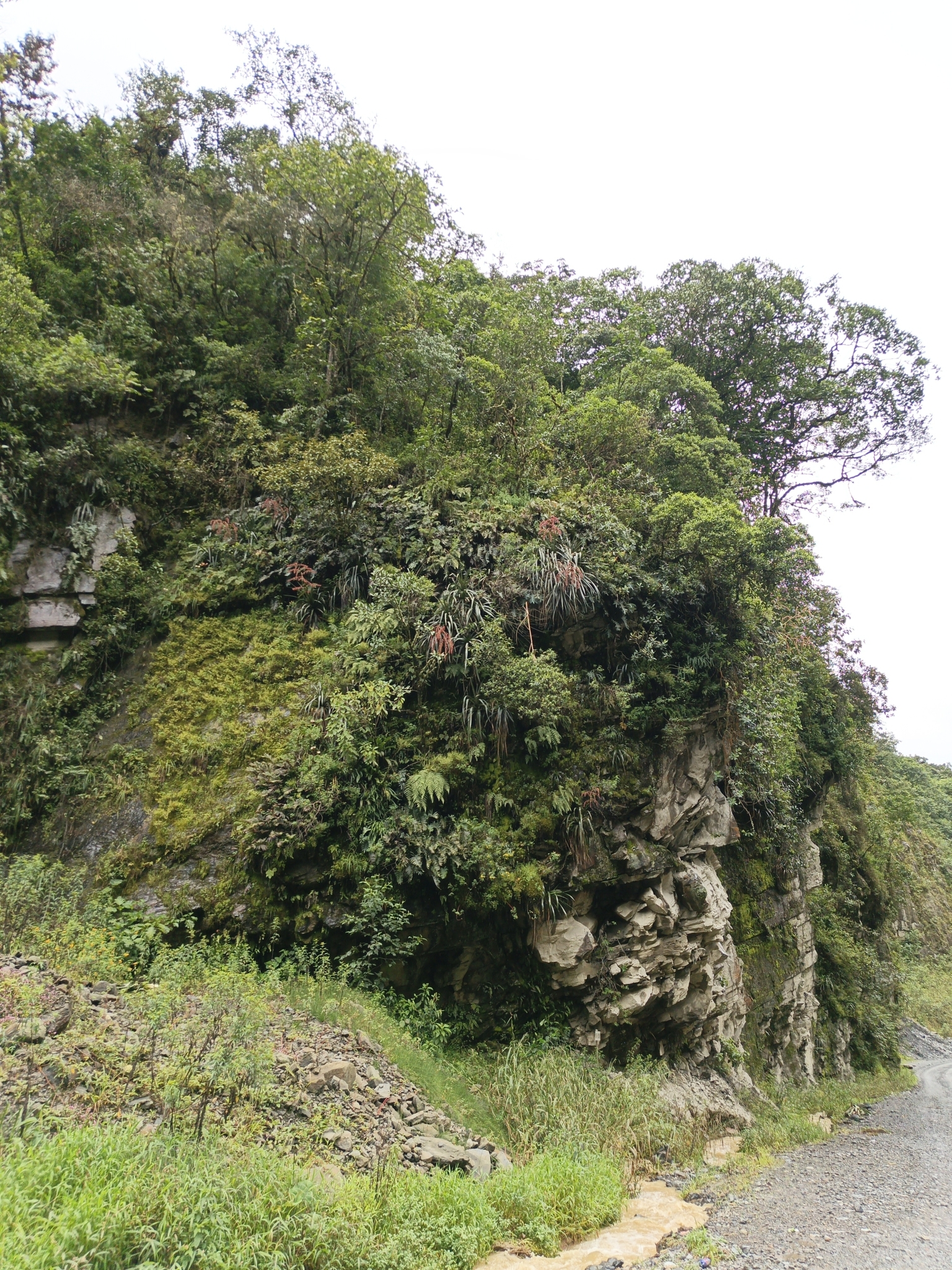

Scientific classification
- Kingdom: Plantae
- Clade: Tracheophytes
- Clade: Angiosperms
- Clade: Monocots
- Clade: Commelinids
- Order: Poales
- Family: Bromeliaceae
- Genus: Puya
- Subgenus: Puya subg. Puyopsis
- Species: P. ultima

Binomial name
- Puya ultima L.B. Smith

= Puya ultima =

Species of flowering plant

Puya ultima is a species of flowering plant in the bromeliad family. This species is endemic to Bolivia.
