= Puya brittoniana =

Scientific classification
- Kingdom: Plantae
- Clade: Tracheophytes
- Clade: Angiosperms
- Clade: Monocots
- Clade: Commelinids
- Order: Poales
- Family: Bromeliaceae
- Genus: Puya
- Subgenus: Puya subg. Puyopsis
- Species: P. brittoniana

Binomial name
- Puya brittoniana Baker

Species of plant

Puya brittoniana is a species in the genus Puya. It is a spiny plant, from the same family as the pineapple. This species is endemic to Bolivia.
