= Racinaea insularis =

Conservation status
- Least Concern (IUCN 3.1)

Scientific classification
- Kingdom: Plantae
- Clade: Embryophytes
- Clade: Tracheophytes
- Clade: Spermatophytes
- Clade: Angiosperms
- Clade: Monocots
- Clade: Commelinids
- Order: Poales
- Family: Bromeliaceae
- Genus: Racinaea
- Species: R. insularis

Binomial name
- Racinaea insularis (Mez) M.A.Spencer & L.B.Sm.

Synonyms
- Homotypic Synonyms: Tillandsia insularis Mez; Heterotypic Synonyms: Racinaea insularis var. latilamina (Gilmartin) M.A.Spencer & L.B.Sm.; Tillandsia insularis var. latilamina Gilmartin

Species of flowering plant

Racinaea insularis is a species of flowering plant in the family Bromeliaceae. This species is endemic to the Galapagos Islands in Ecuador. It is sometimes referred to by the common names Galapagos Tillandsia or Galapagos Bromeliad.
