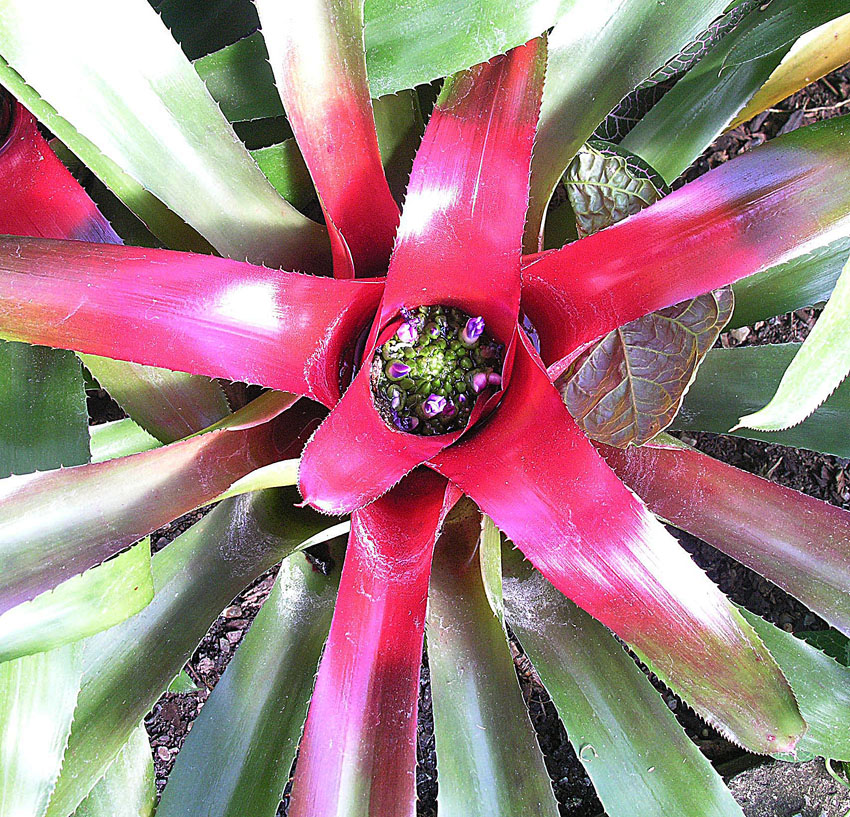

Scientific classification
- Kingdom: Plantae
- Clade: Embryophytes
- Clade: Tracheophytes
- Clade: Spermatophytes
- Clade: Angiosperms
- Clade: Monocots
- Clade: Commelinids
- Order: Poales
- Family: Bromeliaceae
- Genus: Neoregelia
- Subgenus: Neoregelia subg. Neoregelia
- Species: N. olens

Binomial name
- Neoregelia olens (Hook.f.) L.B.Sm.

= Neoregelia olens =

Species of flowering plant

Neoregelia olens is a species of flowering plant in the genus Neoregelia. It is native to Brazil.

== Cultivars ==
- Neoregelia 'Andromeda'
- Neoregelia 'Angie'
- Neoregelia 'Big O'
- Neoregelia 'Blood Plum'
- Neoregelia 'Bob and Barb'
- Neoregelia 'Bright Spot'
- Neoregelia 'Cardinal'
- Neoregelia 'Cheers'
- Neoregelia 'Chilli Pepper'
- Neoregelia 'Christopher Robin'
- Neoregelia 'Cocktail'
- Neoregelia 'Cocktail Girls'
- Neoregelia 'Cocktail Heat'
- Neoregelia 'Coral Fire'
- Neoregelia 'Fiona'
- Neoregelia 'Flaming Lovely'
- Neoregelia 'Flicker'
- Neoregelia 'Gillian'
- Neoregelia 'Golden Jewels'
- Neoregelia 'Golden Ruby'
- Neoregelia 'Golden Sapphire'
- Neoregelia 'Good Morning'
- Neoregelia 'Heart's Blood'
- Neoregelia 'Heck'
- Neoregelia 'Kiko'
- Neoregelia 'Li Hing'
- Neoregelia 'Marie'
- Neoregelia 'Olly Wilson'
- Neoregelia 'Phoebe'
- Neoregelia 'Piglet'
- Neoregelia 'Pinol'
- Neoregelia 'Queen Of Spots'
- Neoregelia 'Red Face'
- Neoregelia 'Salute'
- Neoregelia 'Sparky'
- Neoregelia 'Squirt'
- Neoregelia 'Stormy Forest'
- Neoregelia 'Stormy Forest Too'
- Neoregelia 'Stout Fellow'
- Neoregelia 'Sweet Cocktail'
- Neoregelia 'Topaz'
- Neoregelia 'Truly'
- Neoregelia 'Vulcan'
- Neoregelia 'Winnie the Pooh'
- Neoregelia 'Xmas Cheer'
- Neoregelia 'Zico'
