= Pitcairnia ctenophylla =

Scientific classification
- Kingdom: Plantae
- Clade: Tracheophytes
- Clade: Angiosperms
- Clade: Monocots
- Clade: Commelinids
- Order: Poales
- Family: Bromeliaceae
- Genus: Pitcairnia
- Subgenus: Pitcairnia subg. Pepinia
- Species: P. ctenophylla

Binomial name
- Pitcairnia ctenophylla L.B.Sm.

Synonyms
- Pepinia ctenophylla (L.B.Sm.) G.S.Varad. & Gilmartin

Species of flowering plant

Pitcairnia ctenophylla is a species of flowering plant in the family Bromeliaceae, endemic to Venezuela. It was first described by Lyman Bradford Smith in 1939.
