= Pitcairnia harlingii =

Conservation status
- Vulnerable (IUCN 3.1)

Scientific classification
- Kingdom: Plantae
- Clade: Tracheophytes
- Clade: Angiosperms
- Clade: Monocots
- Clade: Commelinids
- Order: Poales
- Family: Bromeliaceae
- Genus: Pitcairnia
- Subgenus: Pitcairnia subg. Pepinia
- Species: P. harlingii

Binomial name
- Pitcairnia harlingii L.B.Sm.

Synonyms
- Pepinia harlingii (L.B.Sm.) G.S.Varad. & Gilmartin

Species of flowering plant

Pitcairnia harlingii is a species of flowering plant in the family Bromeliaceae, endemic to Ecuador. It was first described by Lyman Bradford Smith in 1961. Its natural habitats are subtropical or tropical moist lowland forests and subtropical or tropical moist montane forests. It is threatened by habitat loss.
