= Pitcairnia alata =

Conservation status
- Endangered (IUCN 3.1)

Scientific classification
- Kingdom: Plantae
- Clade: Tracheophytes
- Clade: Angiosperms
- Clade: Monocots
- Clade: Commelinids
- Order: Poales
- Family: Bromeliaceae
- Genus: Pitcairnia
- Species: P. alata

Binomial name
- Pitcairnia alata L.B.Sm.

Species of epiphyte

Pitcairnia alata is a species of plant in the family Bromeliaceae. It is endemic to Ecuador, where it is known from only two subpopulations in Zamora-Chinchipe Province.

This epiphyte was initially discovered along the Río Valladolid between Quebrada Honda and Tambo Valladolid. Its natural habitat is the forests of the high Andes. It is threatened by habitat destruction as forest is cleared for agriculture.
