= Racinaea pendulispica =

Scientific classification
- Kingdom: Plantae
- Clade: Embryophytes
- Clade: Tracheophytes
- Clade: Spermatophytes
- Clade: Angiosperms
- Clade: Monocots
- Clade: Commelinids
- Order: Poales
- Family: Bromeliaceae
- Genus: Racinaea
- Species: R. pendulispica

Binomial name
- Racinaea pendulispica (Mez) M.A.Spencer & L.B.Sm.

Synonyms
- Homotypic Synonyms: Tillandsia pendulispica Mez; Heterotypic Synonyms: Tillandsia scorpiura Mez; Tillandsia triangularis Rusby

Species of flowering plant

Racinaea pendulispica is a species of flowering plant in the family Bromeliaceae. This species is native to Bolivia.
