= Racinaea parviflora =

Scientific classification
- Kingdom: Plantae
- Clade: Tracheophytes
- Clade: Angiosperms
- Clade: Monocots
- Clade: Commelinids
- Order: Poales
- Family: Bromeliaceae
- Genus: Racinaea
- Species: R. parviflora

Binomial name
- Racinaea parviflora (Ruiz & Pav.) M.A.Spencer & L.B.Sm.

Synonyms
- Platystachys parviflora (Ruiz & Pav.) Beer; Pogospermum parviflorum (Ruiz & Pav.) Brongn.; Tillandsia parviflora Ruiz & Pav.

Species of flowering plant

Racinaea parviflora is a species of flowering plant in the family Bromeliaceae. This species is native to Bolivia and Ecuador.
