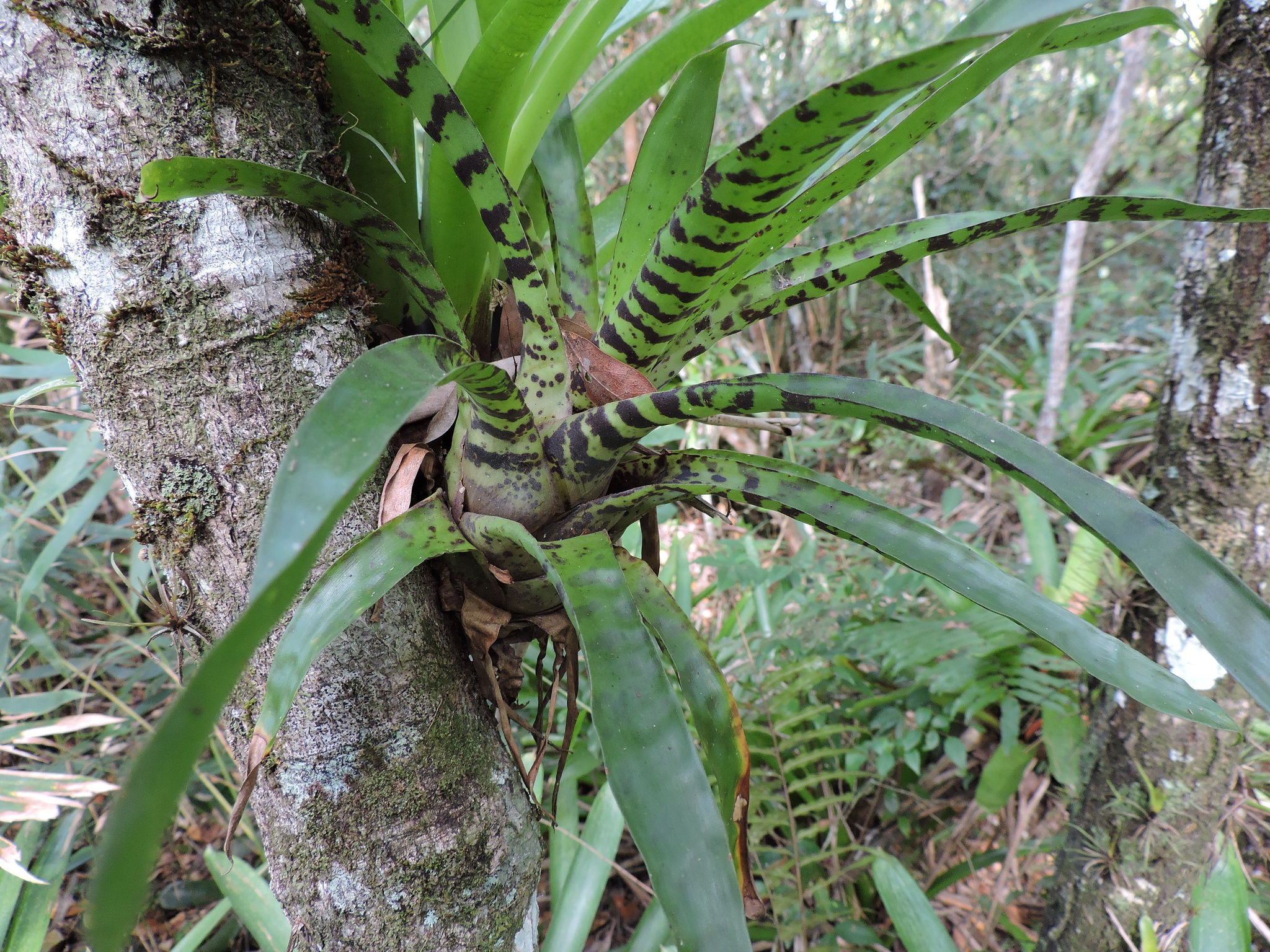

Scientific classification
- Kingdom: Plantae
- Clade: Tracheophytes
- Clade: Angiosperms
- Clade: Monocots
- Clade: Commelinids
- Order: Poales
- Family: Bromeliaceae
- Genus: Racinaea
- Species: R. spiculosa

Binomial name
- Racinaea spiculosa (Griseb.) M.A.Spencer & L.B.Sm.

Synonyms
- Tillandsia spiculosa Griseb.; Tillandsia spiculosa var. typica L.B.Sm.

= Racinaea spiculosa =

Species of flowering plant

Racinaea spiculosa is a species of flowering plant in the family Bromeliaceae. This species is native to Bolivia, Brazil, Costa Rica, Venezuela and Ecuador.

== Habit and ecology ==
The existence of this plant is relatively uncommon, and usually grows on the stems of old trees near the edge of rivers and streams.
