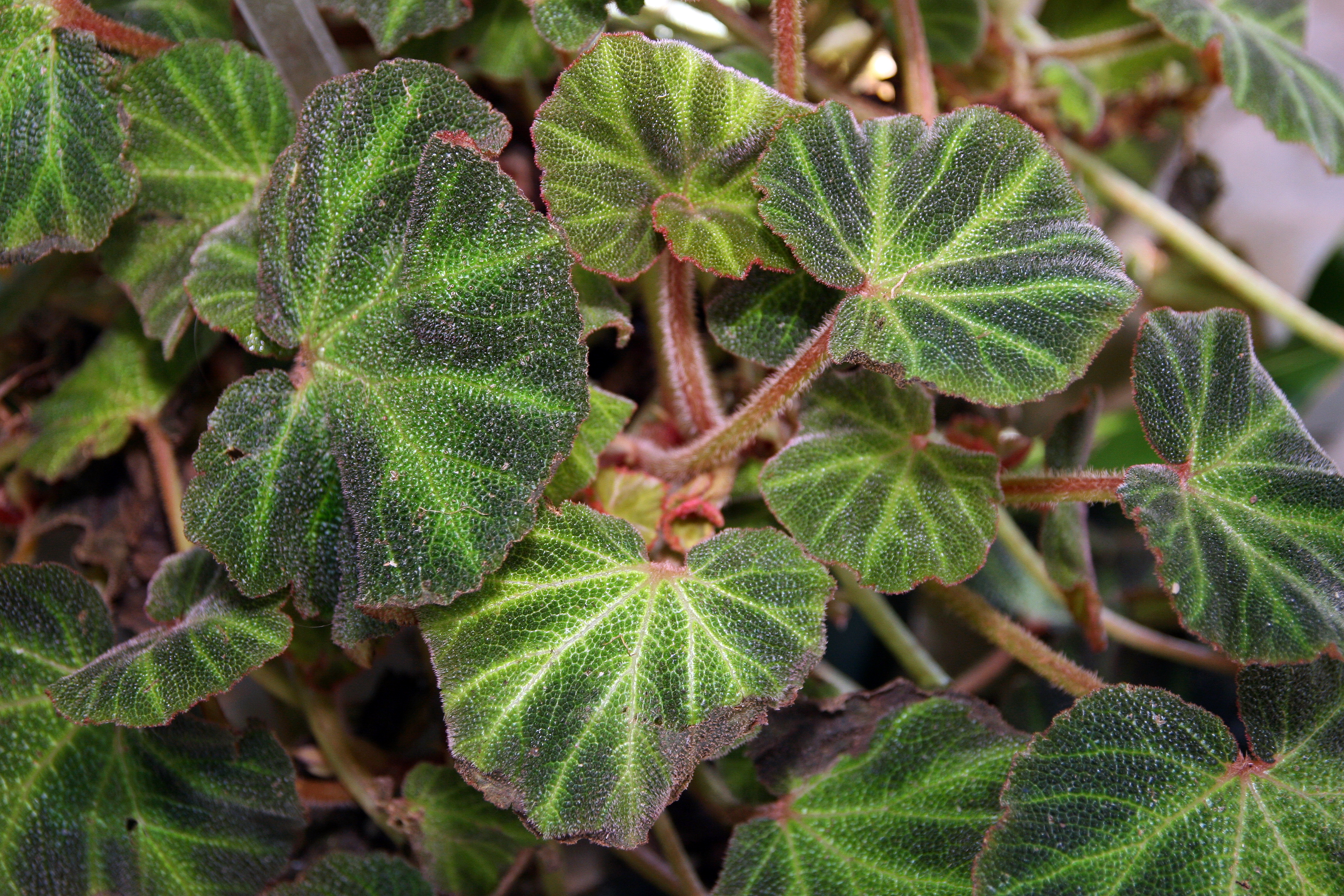
- Foliage
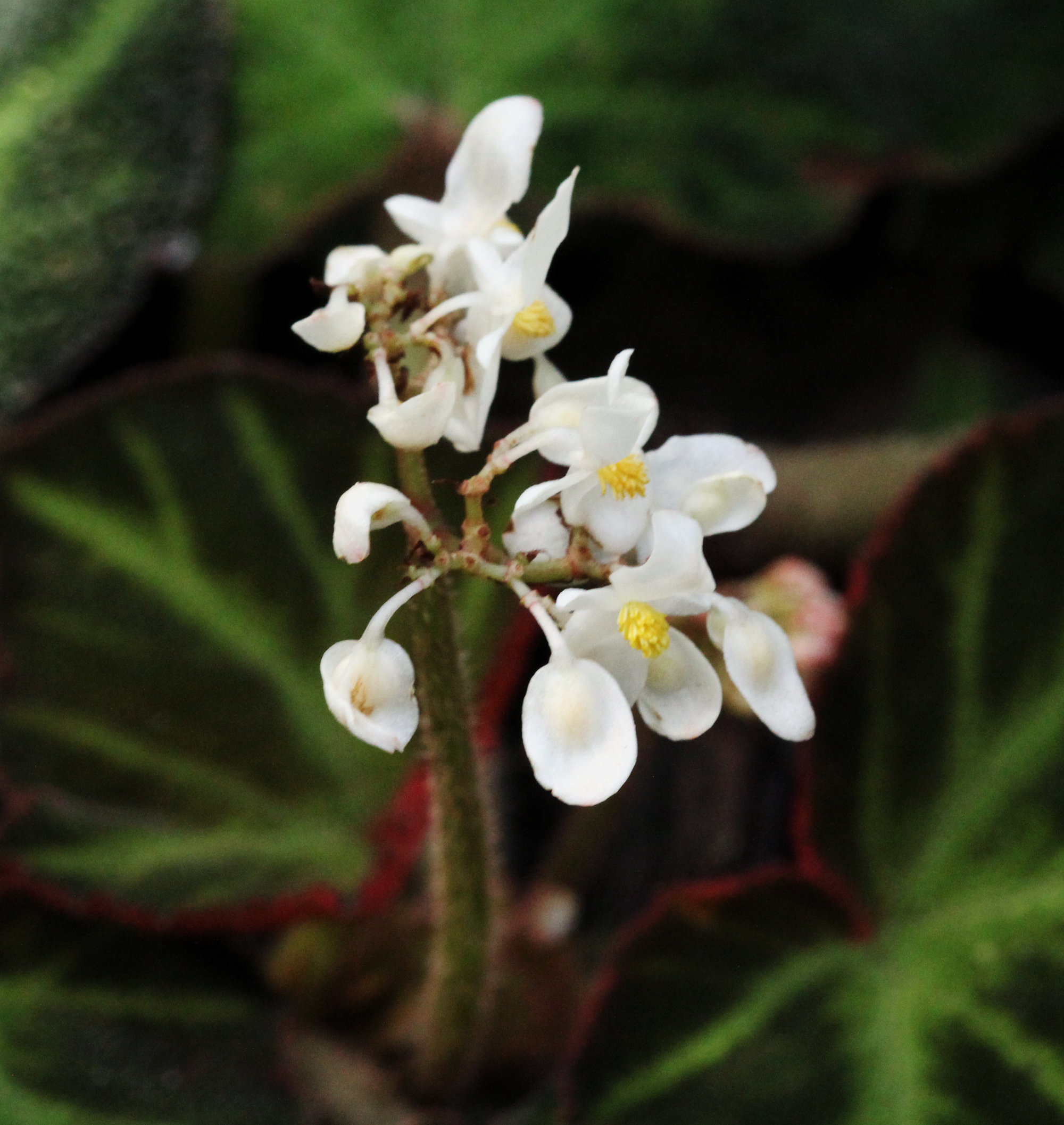
- Close-up of flowers

Scientific classification
- Kingdom: Plantae
- Clade: Tracheophytes
- Clade: Angiosperms
- Clade: Eudicots
- Clade: Rosids
- Order: Cucurbitales
- Family: Begoniaceae
- Genus: Begonia
- Species: B. solimutata

Binomial name
- Begonia solimutata L.B.Sm. & Wassh.

= Begonia solimutata =

Species of flowering plant

Begonia solimutata (or Begonia soli-mutata), the sun-changing begonia, is a species of flowering plant in the family Begoniaceae, native to Pará states in northern Brazil. It has gained the Royal Horticultural Society's Award of Garden Merit.
