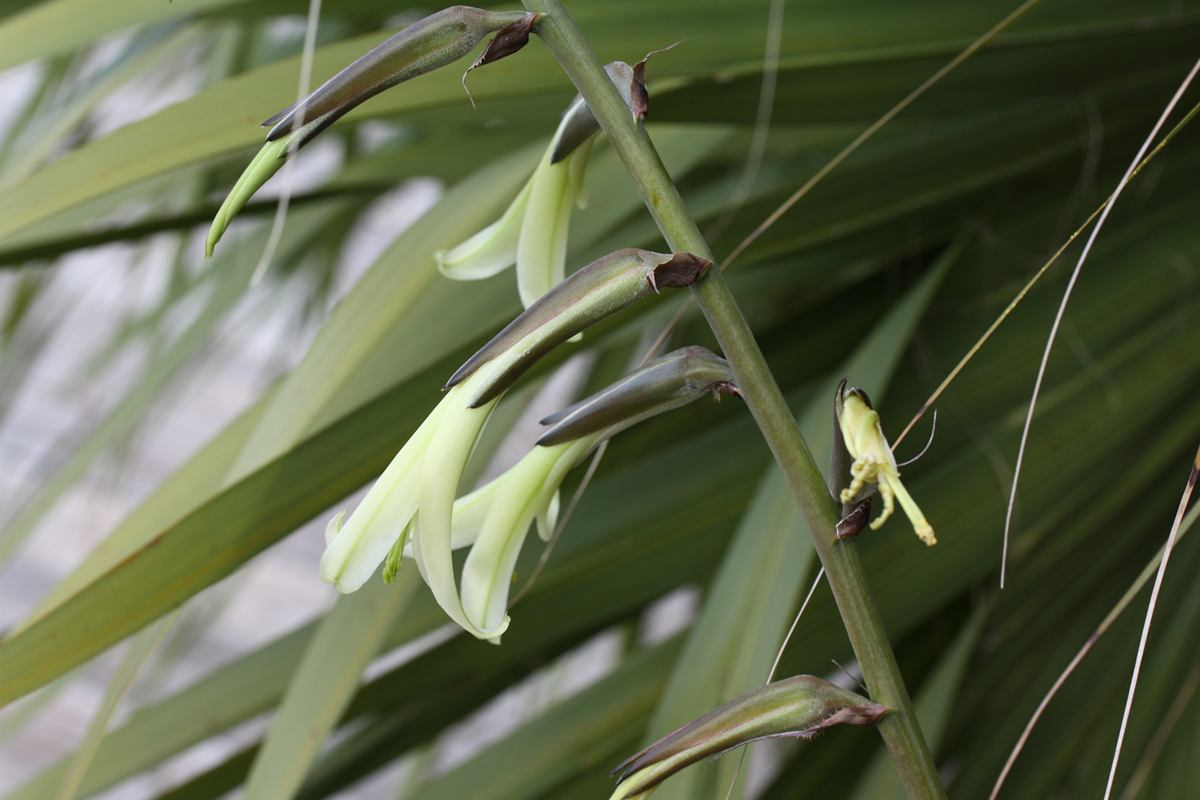

Scientific classification
- Kingdom: Plantae
- Clade: Embryophytes
- Clade: Tracheophytes
- Clade: Spermatophytes
- Clade: Angiosperms
- Clade: Monocots
- Clade: Commelinids
- Order: Poales
- Family: Bromeliaceae
- Genus: Puya
- Subgenus: Puya subg. Puyopsis
- Species: P. mirabilis

Binomial name
- Puya mirabilis (Mez) L.B.Sm.

Synonyms
- Homotypic Synonyms: Pitcairnia mirabilis Mez; Heterotypic Synonyms: Pitcairnia mirabilis var. tucumana A.Cast.; Puya mirabilis var. tucumana A.Cast.

= Puya mirabilis =

Species of flowering plant

Puya mirabilis is a species of flowering plant in the family Bromeliaceae. This species is native to Bolivia.

== Description ==
Puya mirabilis grows as an evergreen, perennial herbaceous plant that reaches heights of 1 to 1.5 meters with its inflorescence. It lives terrestrially and is somewhat xerophytic. Many leaves stand together in a leaf rosette without a trunk being formed. After the seed and pup development, the mother plant slowly dies.

The tough, parallel-veined leaves are divided into leaf sheath and leaf blade. The white to brownish, relatively thick, durable leaf sheath is 3 to 4 centimeters wide and egg-shaped with a length and width of 3 to 4 centimeters with a finely toothed edge. The leaf sheaths are preserved for a long time and form a bulbous protective covering on the plant base. The simple, early balding leaf blade is 60 to 70 centimeters long and 1 to 1.5 centimeters wide at the base of the blade and is narrow-linear with a long, pointed upper end. The leaf margin is coarse, prickly serrated. The underside and the upper side of the leaf are only covered with gray when pressed on the lower half.

For Puya species, an inflorescence is formed after relatively few years. The upright, strong inflorescence stem has a length of 90 centimeters and a round cross-section with a diameter of about 1 centimeter. The initially green, but early drying bracts on the inflorescence stem are similar to the foliage leaves and prickly on the edge, the lower ones being long and turned back and the upper ones being upright and short, but longer than the intervening axis sections. The upright, simple, so unbranched, loose, racemose inflorescence has a length of 30 to 50 centimeters and a diameter of 16 centimeters and some flowers. The early drying, almost upright to spreading bracts are triangular, broadly ovate-elliptical with a pointed upper end, long pointed with a prickly edge and with a length of 3 to 4 centimeters shorter than the sepals, but longer than the flower stalks. The 1.2 to 1.5 centimeter long peduncle is initially almost upright and curves downwards after pollination.

The hermaphrodite flower is threefold with a double flower envelope. The three green, gray-scaled, relatively thick, leathery sepals are somewhat asymmetrical, about 5 to almost 6 centimeters long and about 1 centimeter wide and almost triangular with an indistinctly pointed upper end. The three greenish-yellow, bare petals are about 10 centimeters long and about 2 centimeters wide and twist in a spiral as they fade. The six free stamens have about 15 millimeters long, yellow anthers and are slightly shorter than the petals. Three carpels have grown together to form a semi-protruding ovary.

The capsule fruits contain many seeds. The small seeds are capable of flying

== Cultivars ==
- Puya 'Poseidon's Trident'

== Gallery ==
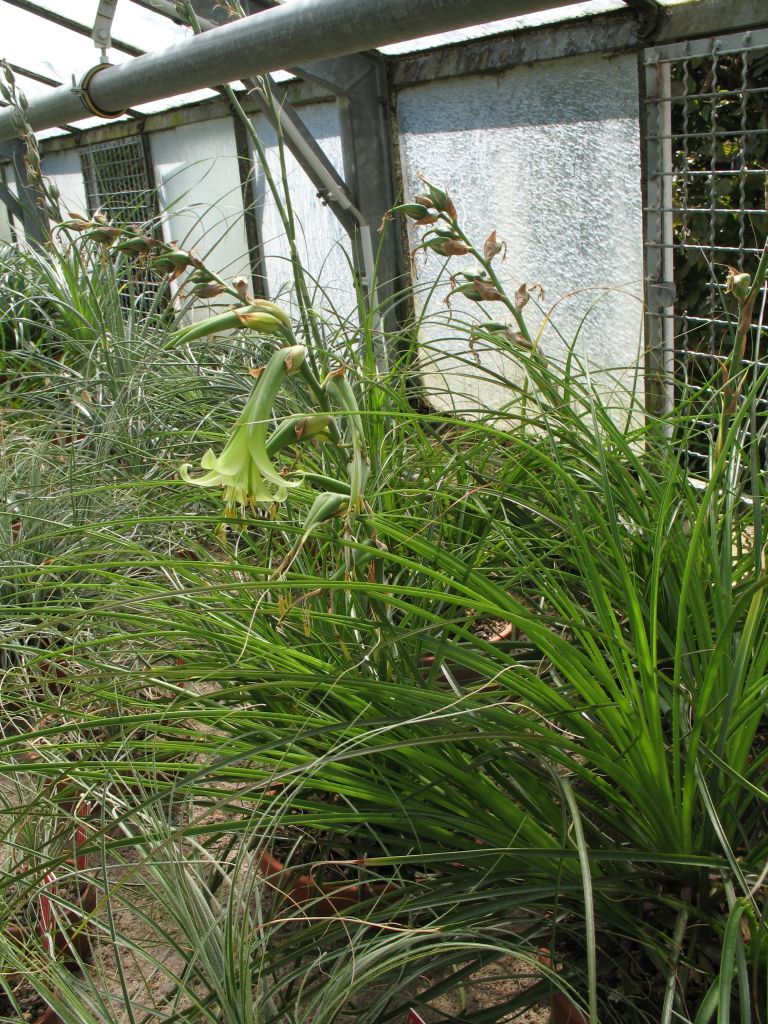

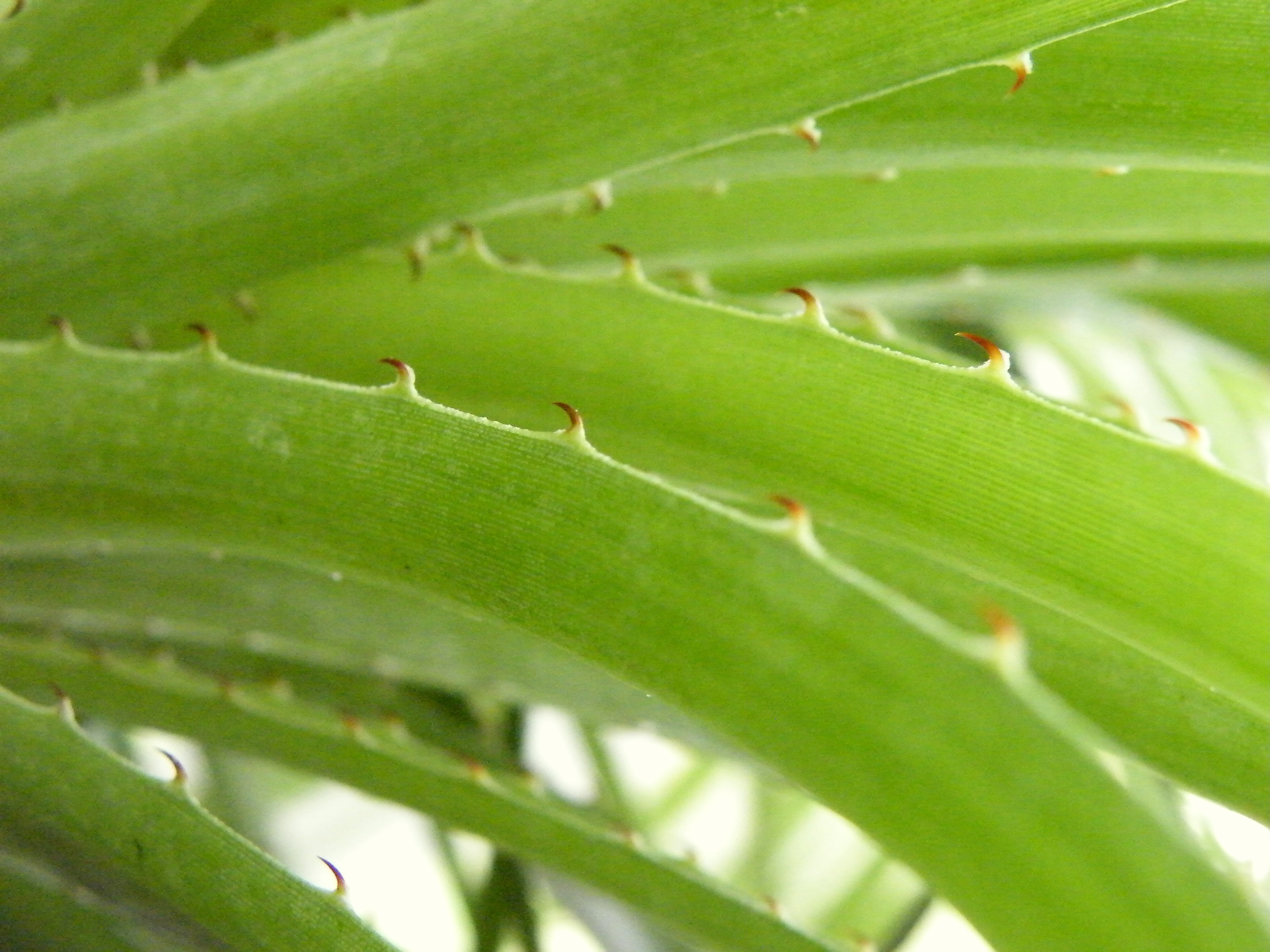

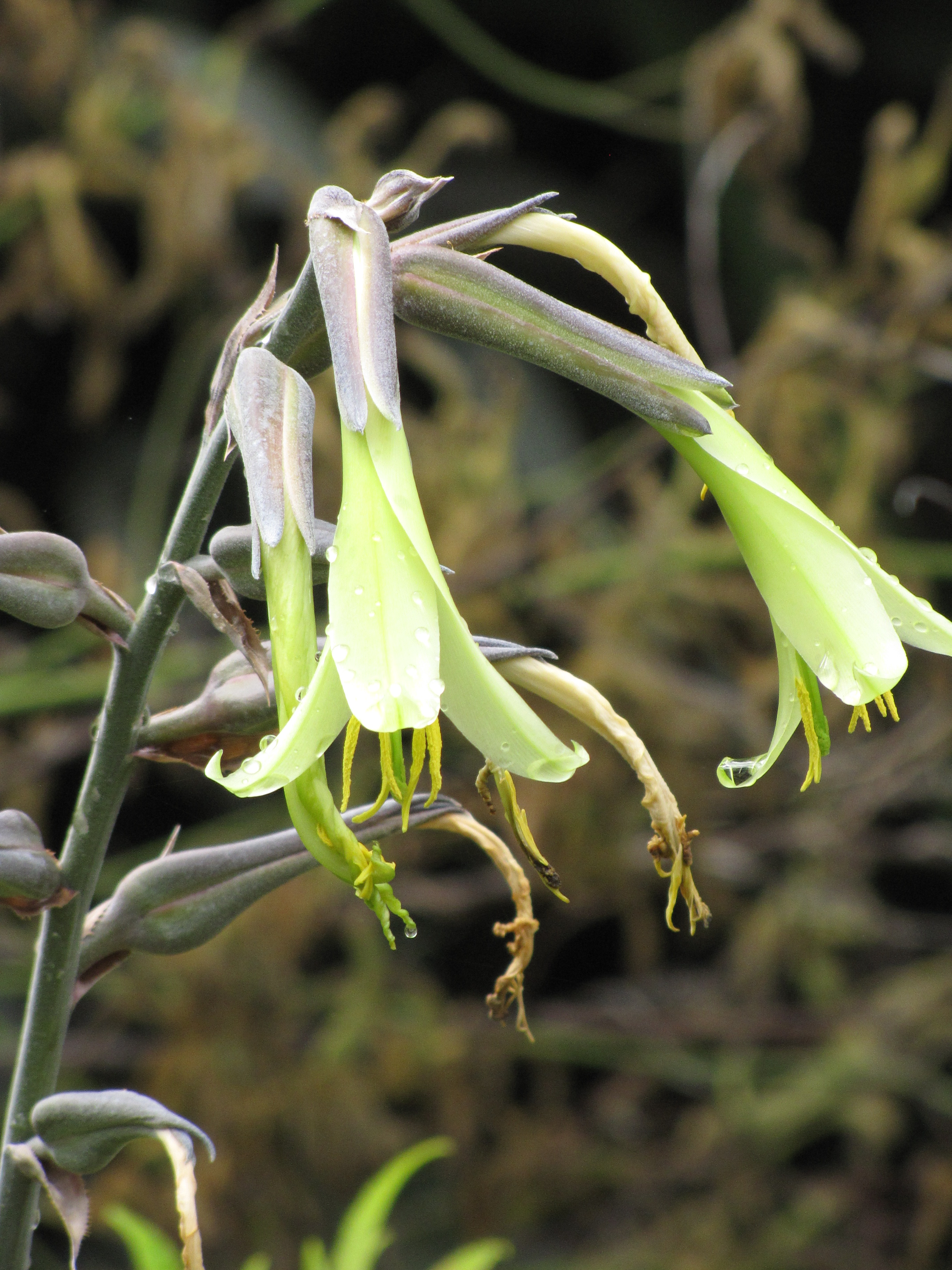
Flowers

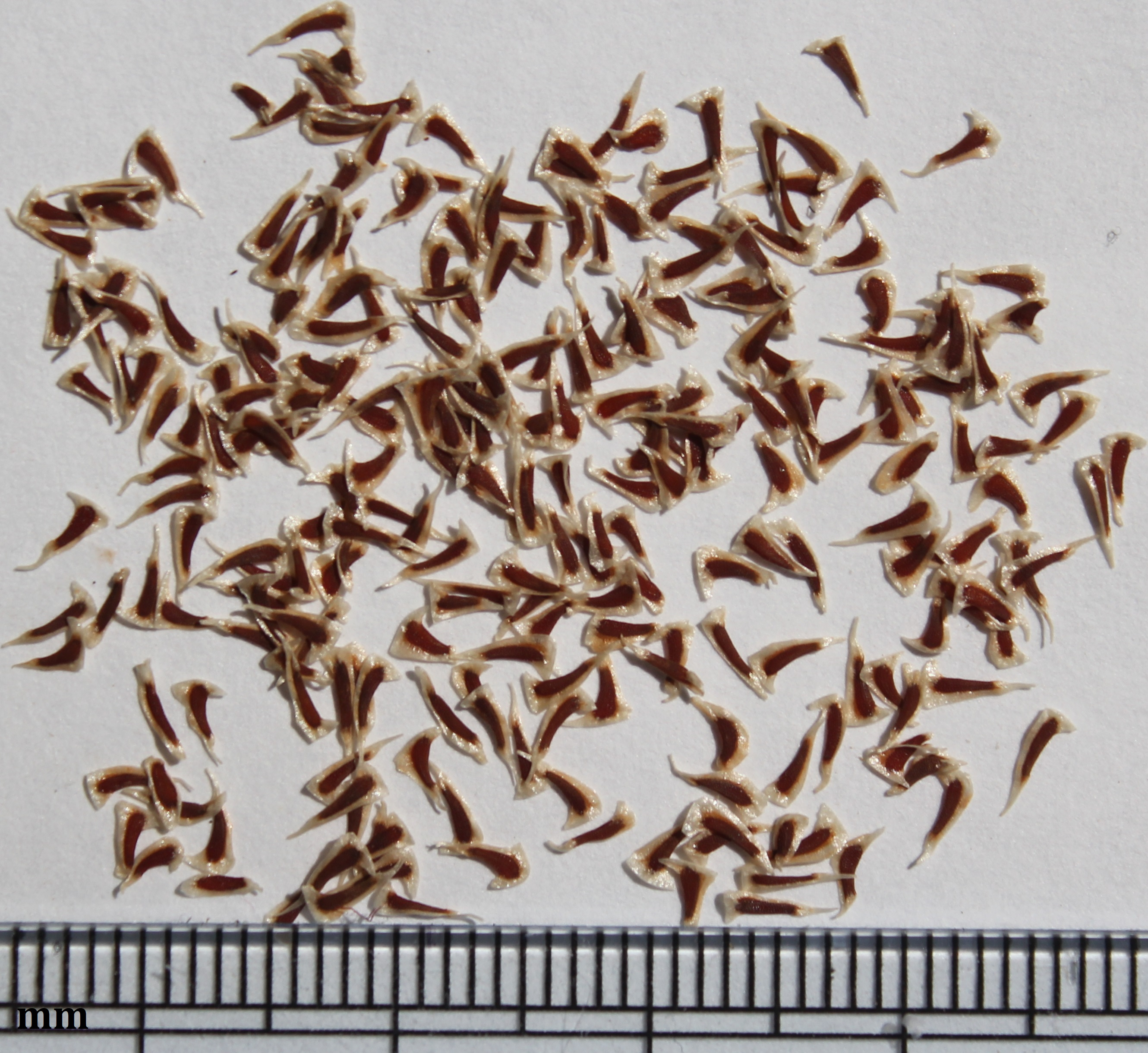
Seeds
