= Begonia holmnielseniana =

Conservation status
- Vulnerable (IUCN 3.1)

Scientific classification
- Kingdom: Plantae
- Clade: Tracheophytes
- Clade: Angiosperms
- Clade: Eudicots
- Clade: Rosids
- Order: Cucurbitales
- Family: Begoniaceae
- Genus: Begonia
- Species: B. holmnielseniana

Binomial name
- Begonia holmnielseniana L.B.Sm. & Wassh.

Species of flowering plant

Begonia holmnielseniana is a species of plant in the family Begoniaceae. It is endemic to Ecuador. Its natural habitats are subtropical or tropical moist montane forests and subtropical or tropical high-altitude grassland.
