= Racinaea aeris-incola =

Scientific classification
- Kingdom: Plantae
- Clade: Embryophytes
- Clade: Tracheophytes
- Clade: Spermatophytes
- Clade: Angiosperms
- Clade: Monocots
- Clade: Commelinids
- Order: Poales
- Family: Bromeliaceae
- Genus: Racinaea
- Species: R. aeris-incola

Binomial name
- Racinaea aeris-incola (Mez) M.A.Spencer & L.B.Sm.

Synonyms
- Homotypic Synonyms: Tillandsia aeris-incola (Mez) Mez; Vriesea aeris-incola Mez; Heterotypic Synonyms: Catopsis deflexa Ule; Catopsis maculata É.Morren ex Baker

Species of flowering plant

Racinaea aeris-incola is a species of flowering plant in the family Bromeliaceae. This species is endemic to Brazil.
