= Pitcairnia juncoides =

Scientific classification
- Kingdom: Plantae
- Clade: Tracheophytes
- Clade: Angiosperms
- Clade: Monocots
- Clade: Commelinids
- Order: Poales
- Family: Bromeliaceae
- Genus: Pitcairnia
- Subgenus: Pitcairnia subg. Pepinia
- Species: P. juncoides

Binomial name
- Pitcairnia juncoides L.B.Sm.

Synonyms
- Pepinia juncoides (L.B.Sm.) G.S.Varad. & Gilmartin

Species of flowering plant

Pitcairnia juncoides is a species of flowering plant in the family Bromeliaceae, native to Colombia and Venezuela). It was first described by Lyman Bradford Smith in 1946.
