= Racinaea quadripinnata =

Conservation status
- Near Threatened (IUCN 3.1)

Scientific classification
- Kingdom: Plantae
- Clade: Embryophytes
- Clade: Tracheophytes
- Clade: Spermatophytes
- Clade: Angiosperms
- Clade: Monocots
- Clade: Commelinids
- Order: Poales
- Family: Bromeliaceae
- Genus: Racinaea
- Species: R. quadripinnata

Binomial name
- Racinaea quadripinnata (Mez & Sodiro) M.A.Spencer & L.B.Sm.

Synonyms
- Homotypic Synonyms: Tillandsia quadripinnata Mez & Sodiro

Species of flowering plant

Racinaea quadripinnata is a species of flowering plant in the family Bromeliaceae. It is endemic to Ecuador. Its natural habitats are subtropical or tropical moist montane forests and subtropical or tropical high-altitude shrubland. It is threatened by habitat loss.
