= Pitcairnia unilateralis =

Conservation status
- Vulnerable (IUCN 3.1)

Scientific classification
- Kingdom: Plantae
- Clade: Embryophytes
- Clade: Tracheophytes
- Clade: Spermatophytes
- Clade: Angiosperms
- Clade: Monocots
- Clade: Commelinids
- Order: Poales
- Family: Bromeliaceae
- Genus: Pitcairnia
- Species: P. unilateralis

Binomial name
- Pitcairnia unilateralis L.B.Sm.

Species of flowering plant

Pitcairnia unilateralis is a species of plant in the family Bromeliaceae. It is endemic to Ecuador. Its natural habitats are subtropical or tropical moist lowland forests and subtropical or tropical moist montane forests. The specific epithet, unilateralis, is derived from Latin and means "one-sided".
