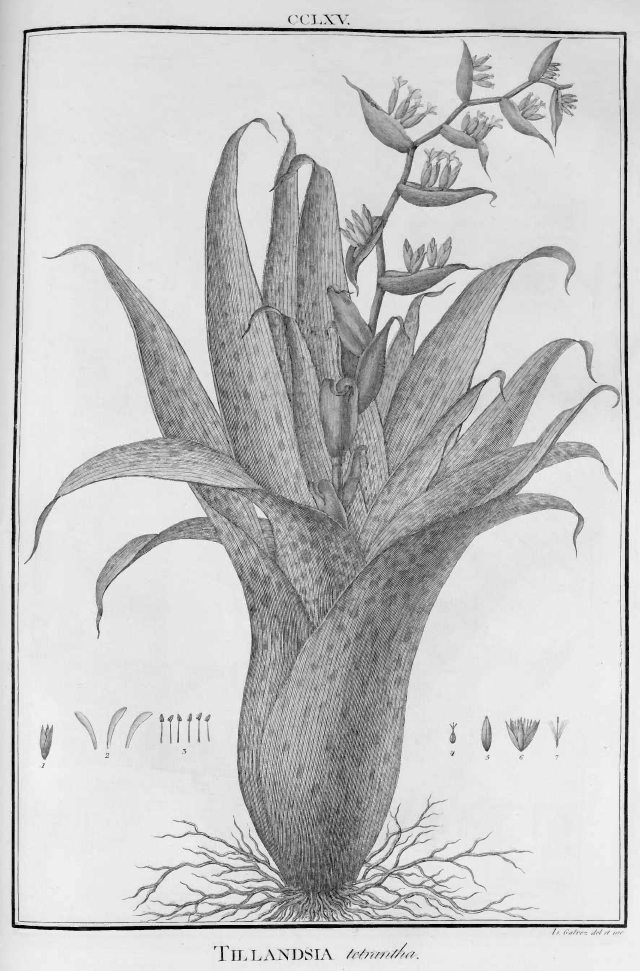

Scientific classification
- Kingdom: Plantae
- Clade: Tracheophytes
- Clade: Angiosperms
- Clade: Monocots
- Clade: Commelinids
- Order: Poales
- Family: Bromeliaceae
- Genus: Racinaea
- Species: R. tetrantha

Binomial name
- Racinaea tetrantha (Ruiz & Pav.) M.A.Spencer & L.B.Sm.

Synonyms
- Billbergia tetrantha (Ruiz & Pav.) Beer; Tillandsia tetrantha Ruiz & Pav.; Tillandsia tetrantha var. typica L.B.Sm.

= Racinaea tetrantha =

Species of flowering plant

Racinaea tetrantha is a species of flowering plant in the family Bromeliaceae. This species is native to Bolivia, Costa Rica, Venezuela and Ecuador.
