= Vriesea lancifolia =

Scientific classification
- Kingdom: Plantae
- Clade: Tracheophytes
- Clade: Angiosperms
- Clade: Monocots
- Clade: Commelinids
- Order: Poales
- Family: Bromeliaceae
- Genus: Vriesea
- Species: V. lancifolia

Binomial name
- Vriesea lancifolia (Baker) L.B.Sm.

Synonyms
- Tillandsia lancifolia Baker

Species of plant

Vriesea lancifolia is a species of flowering plant in the Bromeliaceae family. It is endemic to Brazil.
