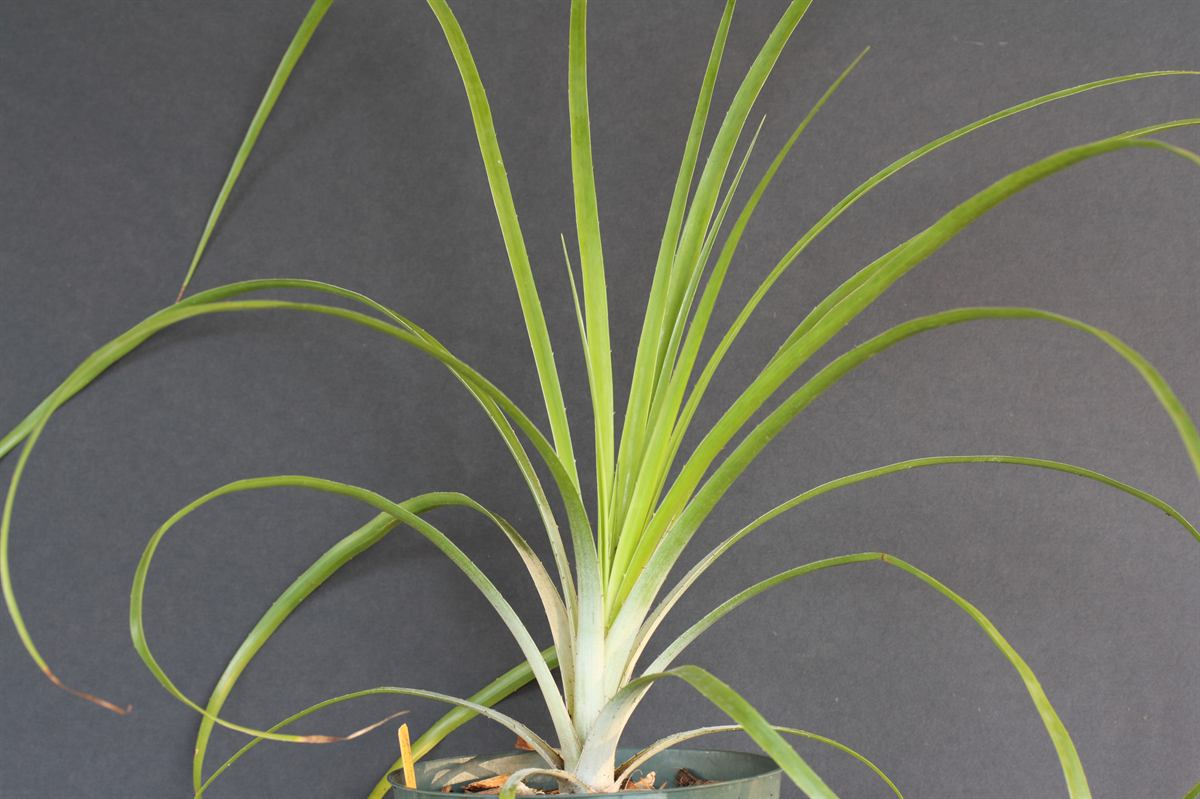
- Seedling

Scientific classification
- Kingdom: Plantae
- Clade: Tracheophytes
- Clade: Angiosperms
- Clade: Monocots
- Clade: Commelinids
- Order: Poales
- Family: Bromeliaceae
- Genus: Pitcairnia
- Subgenus: Pitcairnia subg. Pepinia
- Species: P. bulbosa

Binomial name
- Pitcairnia bulbosa L.B.Sm.

Synonyms
- Pepinia bulbosa (L.B.Sm.) G.S.Varad. & Gilmartin; Pepinia wurdackii (L.B.Sm.) G.S.Varad. & Gilmartin; Pitcairnia wurdackii L.B.Sm

= Pitcairnia bulbosa =

Species of flowering plant

Pitcairnia bulbosa, synonym Pepinia bulbosa, is a species of flowering plant in the family Bromeliaceae, native to Colombia and Venezuela. It was first described by Lyman Bradford Smith in 1955. In Colombia, it is found in dry rich soil in crevices of granite rock.
