= Vriesea drewii =

Conservation status
- Endangered (IUCN 3.1)

Scientific classification
- Kingdom: Plantae
- Clade: Tracheophytes
- Clade: Angiosperms
- Clade: Monocots
- Clade: Commelinids
- Order: Poales
- Family: Bromeliaceae
- Genus: Vriesea
- Species: V. drewii

Binomial name
- Vriesea drewii L.B.Sm.

Species of flowering plant

Vriesea drewii is a species of plant in the family Bromeliaceae. It is endemic to Ecuador. Its natural habitats are subtropical or tropical moist montane forests and subtropical or tropical high-altitude shrubland. It is threatened by habitat loss.
