= Racinaea rothschuhiana =

Scientific classification
- Kingdom: Plantae
- Clade: Embryophytes
- Clade: Tracheophytes
- Clade: Spermatophytes
- Clade: Angiosperms
- Clade: Monocots
- Clade: Commelinids
- Order: Poales
- Family: Bromeliaceae
- Genus: Racinaea
- Species: R. rothschuhiana

Binomial name
- Racinaea rothschuhiana (Mez) M.A.Spencer & L.B.Sm.

Synonyms
- Homotypic Synonyms: Tillandsia rothschuhiana Mez; Tillandsia spiculosa var. rothschuhiana (Mez) L.B.Sm.; Heterotypic Synonyms: Racinaea adscendens (L.B.Sm.) M.A.Spencer & L.B.Sm.; Tillandsia adscendens L.B.Sm.

Species of flowering plant

Racinaea rothschuhiana is a species of flowering plant in the family Bromeliaceae. This species is native to southern Mexico and Central America.
