= Pitcairnia uaupensis =

Scientific classification
- Kingdom: Plantae
- Clade: Tracheophytes
- Clade: Angiosperms
- Clade: Monocots
- Clade: Commelinids
- Order: Poales
- Family: Bromeliaceae
- Genus: Pitcairnia
- Subgenus: Pitcairnia subg. Pepinia
- Species: P. uaupensis

Binomial name
- Pitcairnia uaupensis Baker

Synonyms
- Hepetis uaupensis (Baker) Mez; Pepinia uaupensis (Baker) G.S.Varad. & Gilmartin

Species of flowering plant

Pitcairnia uaupensis is a species of flowering plant in the family Bromeliaceae, native to northern South America (northern Brazil, Colombia and Venezuela). It was first described by John Gilbert Baker in 1889.
