= Pitcairnia alexanderi =

Conservation status
- Endangered (IUCN 3.1)

Scientific classification
- Kingdom: Plantae
- Clade: Tracheophytes
- Clade: Angiosperms
- Clade: Monocots
- Clade: Commelinids
- Order: Poales
- Family: Bromeliaceae
- Genus: Pitcairnia
- Subgenus: Pitcairnia subg. Pepinia
- Species: P. alexanderi

Binomial name
- Pitcairnia alexanderi (H.Luther) D.C.Taylor & H.Rob.

Synonyms
- Pepinia alexanderi H.Luther

Species of flowering plant

Pitcairnia alexanderi is a species of flowering plant in the family Bromeliaceae, endemic to eastern Ecuador, where it is known from only three subpopulations in Morona-Santiago Province. It grows in Amazonian forest habitat, and it is threatened by deforestation. It was first described by Harry Edward Luther in 1991 as Pepinia alexanderi.
