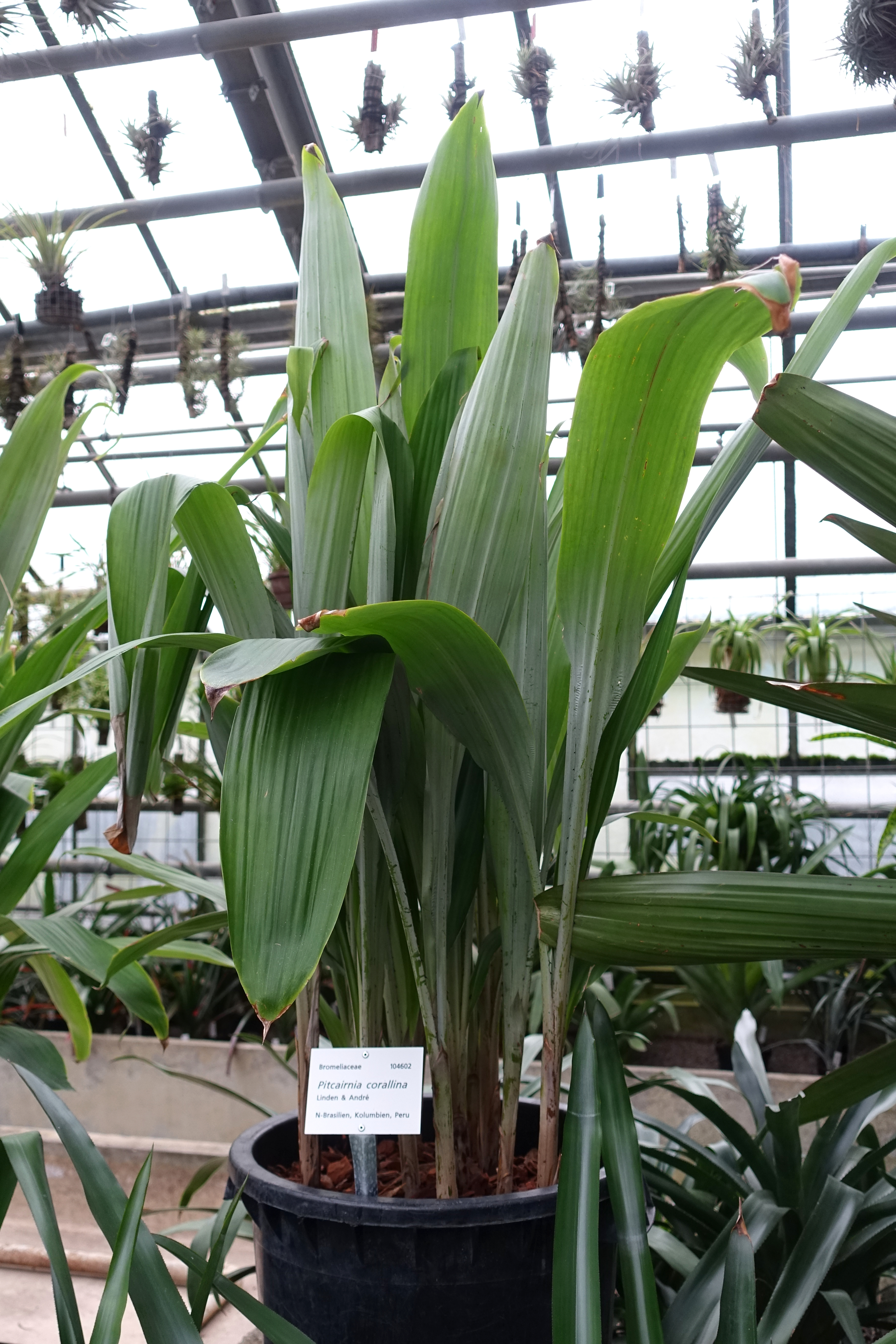

Scientific classification
- Kingdom: Plantae
- Clade: Tracheophytes
- Clade: Angiosperms
- Clade: Monocots
- Clade: Commelinids
- Order: Poales
- Family: Bromeliaceae
- Genus: Pitcairnia
- Subgenus: Pitcairnia subg. Pepinia
- Species: P. corallina

Binomial name
- Pitcairnia corallina Linden & André

Synonyms
- Hepetis corallina (Linden & André) Mez, A.L.P.P.de Candolle & A.C.P.de Candolle; Pepinia corallina (Linden & André) G.S.Varad. & Gilmartin

= Pitcairnia corallina =

Species of flowering plant

Pitcairnia corallina is a species of flowering plant in the family Bromeliaceae, native to northern Brazil, Colombia and Peru. It was first described in 1873.
