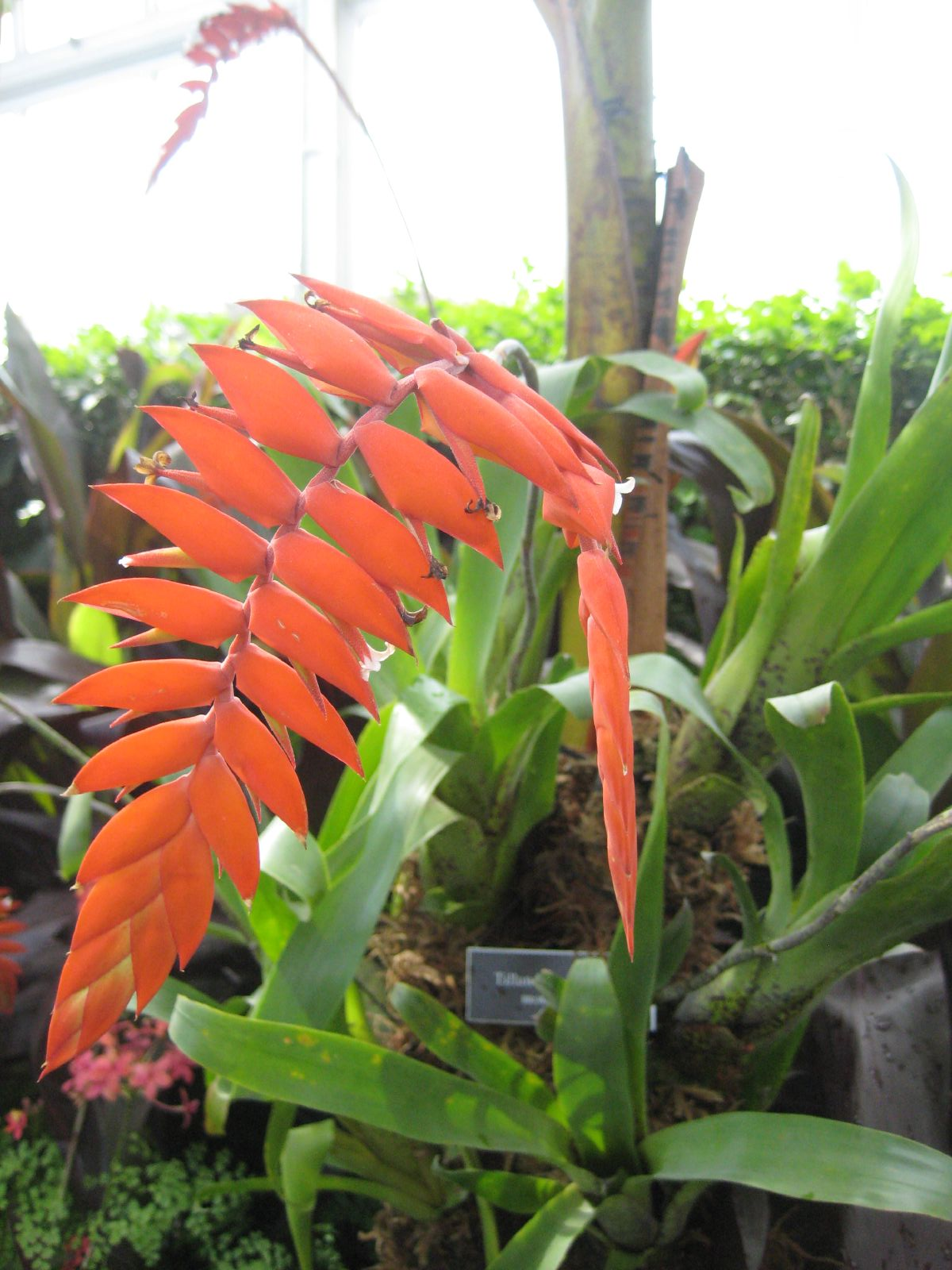

Conservation status
- Critically Endangered (IUCN 3.1)

Scientific classification
- Kingdom: Plantae
- Clade: Tracheophytes
- Clade: Angiosperms
- Clade: Monocots
- Clade: Commelinids
- Order: Poales
- Family: Bromeliaceae
- Genus: Racinaea
- Species: R. dyeriana

Binomial name
- Racinaea dyeriana (André) Barfuss & W.Till

Synonyms
- Tillandsia dyeriana André; Tillandsia rutschmannii Rauh

= Racinaea dyeriana =

Species of plant

Racinaea dyeriana is a species of plant in the family Bromeliaceae. It is endemic to Ecuador. Its natural habitat is subtropical or tropical mangrove forests. It is threatened by habitat loss.
