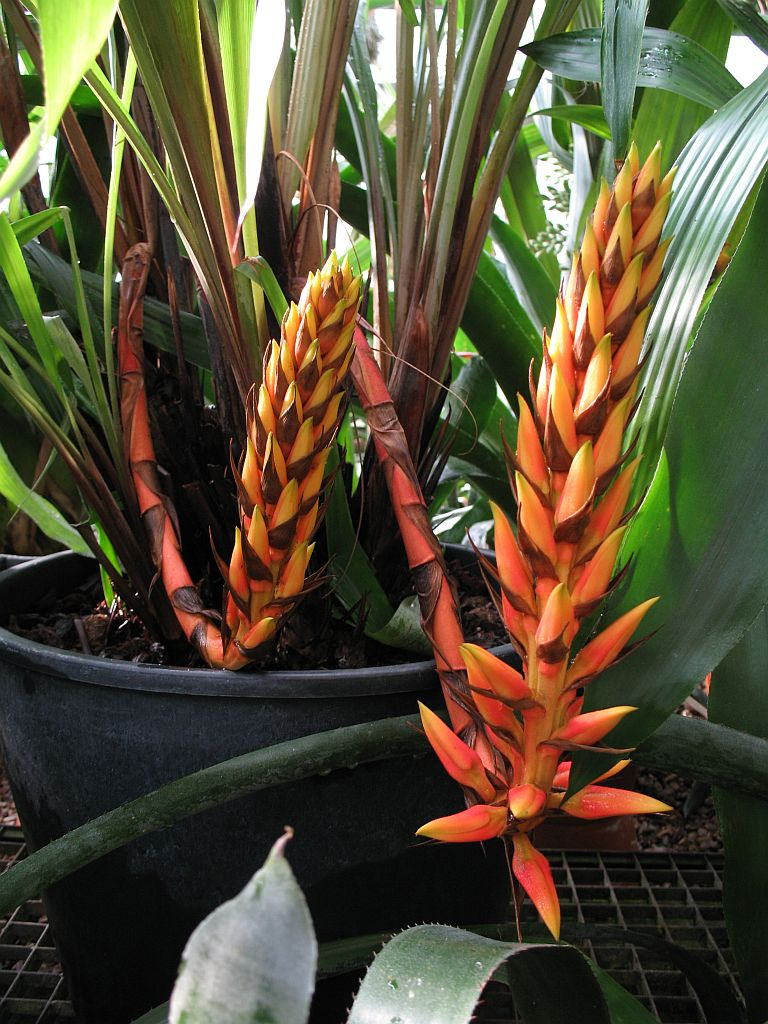

Conservation status
- Vulnerable (IUCN 3.1)

Scientific classification
- Kingdom: Plantae
- Clade: Tracheophytes
- Clade: Angiosperms
- Clade: Monocots
- Clade: Commelinids
- Order: Poales
- Family: Bromeliaceae
- Genus: Pitcairnia
- Subgenus: Pitcairnia subg. Pepinia
- Species: P. elvirae

Binomial name
- Pitcairnia elvirae D.C.Taylor & H.Rob.

Synonyms
- Pepinia verrucosa E.Gross

= Pitcairnia elvirae =

Species of flowering plant

Pitcairnia elvirae, synonym Pepinia verrucosa, is a species of flowering plant in the family Bromeliaceae, endemic to Ecuador. It was first described in 1999. Its natural habitats are subtropical or tropical moist lowland forests and subtropical or tropical moist montane forests. It is threatened by habitat loss.
