= Pitcairnia beachiae =

Scientific classification
- Kingdom: Plantae
- Clade: Tracheophytes
- Clade: Angiosperms
- Clade: Monocots
- Clade: Commelinids
- Order: Poales
- Family: Bromeliaceae
- Genus: Pitcairnia
- Subgenus: Pitcairnia subg. Pepinia
- Species: P. beachiae

Binomial name
- Pitcairnia beachiae Utley & Burt-Utley

Synonyms
- Pepinia beachiae (Utley & Burt-Utley) H.Luther

Species of flowering plant

Pitcairnia beachiae is a species of flowering plant in the family Bromeliaceae, native to Costa Rica. It was first described in 1991.
