= Racinaea nervibractea =

Scientific classification
- Kingdom: Plantae
- Clade: Tracheophytes
- Clade: Angiosperms
- Clade: Monocots
- Clade: Commelinids
- Order: Poales
- Family: Bromeliaceae
- Genus: Racinaea
- Species: R. nervibractea

Binomial name
- Racinaea nervibractea (Gilmartin & H. Luther) J.R. Grant

Species of flowering plant

Racinaea nervibractea is a plant species in the genus Racinaea. This species is native to Bolivia and Ecuador.
