= Racinaea seemannii =

Scientific classification
- Kingdom: Plantae
- Clade: Tracheophytes
- Clade: Angiosperms
- Clade: Monocots
- Clade: Commelinids
- Order: Poales
- Family: Bromeliaceae
- Genus: Racinaea
- Species: R. seemannii

Binomial name
- Racinaea seemannii (Baker) M.A. Spencer & L.B. Smith

Species of flowering plant

Racinaea seemannii is a plant species in the genus Racinaea. This species is native to Bolivia, Venezuela and Ecuador.
