= Pitcairnia armata =

Scientific classification
- Kingdom: Plantae
- Clade: Tracheophytes
- Clade: Angiosperms
- Clade: Monocots
- Clade: Commelinids
- Order: Poales
- Family: Bromeliaceae
- Genus: Pitcairnia
- Subgenus: Pitcairnia subg. Pepinia
- Species: P. armata

Binomial name
- Pitcairnia armata Maury

Synonyms
- Pepinia armata (Maury) G.S.Varad. & Gilmartin; Pepinia breweri (L.B.Sm.) G.S.Varad. & Gilmartin; Pitcairnia breweri L.B.Sm.; Pitcairnia cinerea L.B.Sm.

Species of flowering plant

Pitcairnia armata is a species of flowering plant in the family Bromeliaceae, endemic to Venezuela. It was first described in 1889.
