= Pitcairnia punicea =

Scientific classification
- Kingdom: Plantae
- Clade: Tracheophytes
- Clade: Angiosperms
- Clade: Monocots
- Clade: Commelinids
- Order: Poales
- Family: Bromeliaceae
- Genus: Pitcairnia
- Subgenus: Pitcairnia subg. Pepinia
- Species: P. punicea

Binomial name
- Pitcairnia punicea Scheidw.

Synonyms
- Hepetis punicea (Scheidw.) Mez; Pepinia punicea (Scheidw.) Andrews; Lamproconus jacksonii (Hook.) Hemsl.; Pitcairnia humilis Ten.; Pitcairnia jacksonii Hook.

Species of flowering plant

Pitcairnia punicea is a species of flowering plant in the family Bromeliaceae, native to southeastern Mexico, Belize and Guatemala. It was first described by Michael Joseph François Scheidweiler in 1842.
