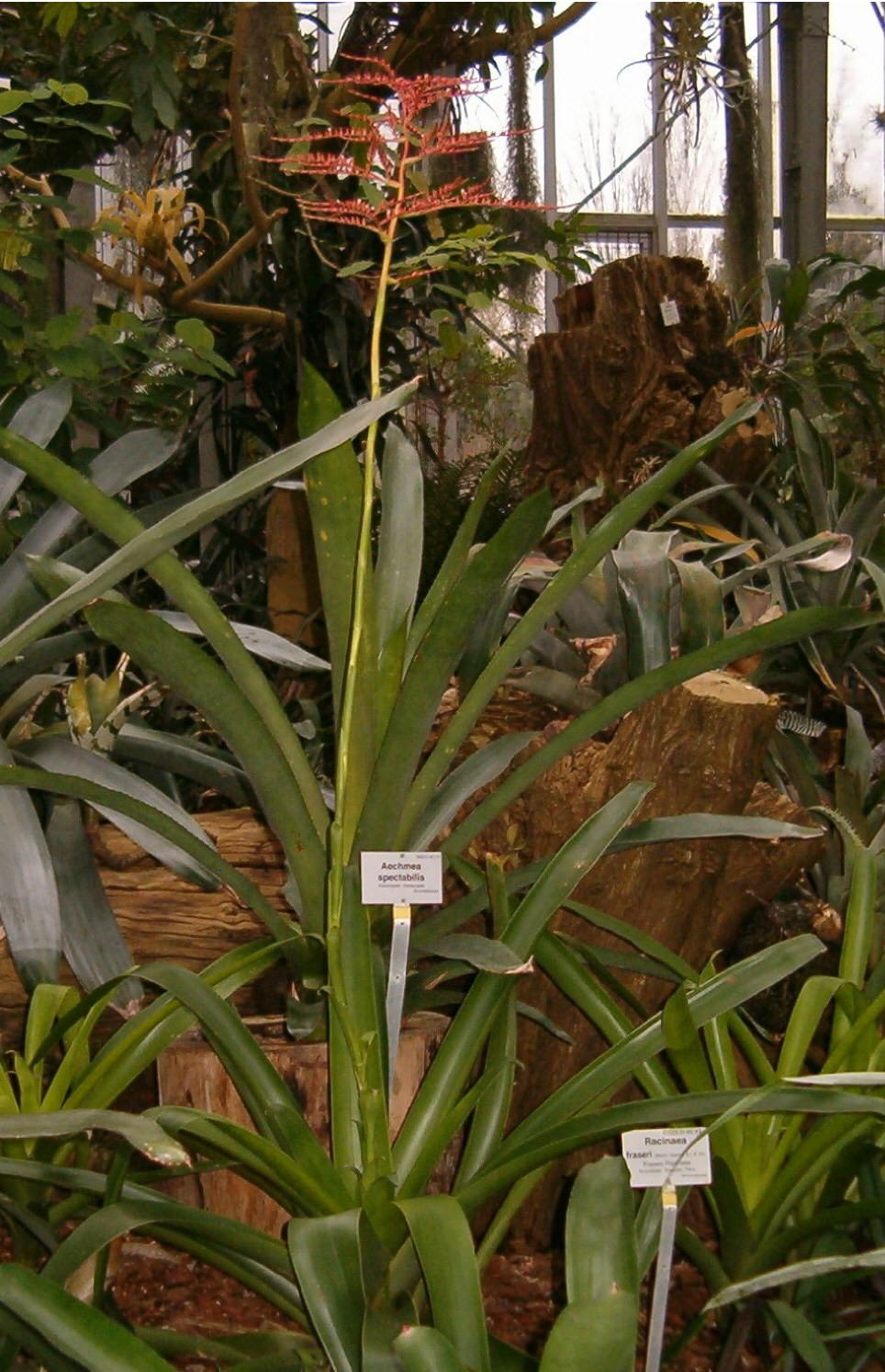
- Racinaea fraseri

Scientific classification
- Kingdom: Plantae
- Clade: Tracheophytes
- Clade: Angiosperms
- Clade: Monocots
- Clade: Commelinids
- Order: Poales
- Family: Bromeliaceae
- Subfamily: Tillandsioideae
- Genus: Racinaea; M.A.Spencer & L.B.Sm.

Species
- See text

= Racinaea =

Genus of flowering plants

Racinaea is a genus of the flowering plants in the family Bromeliaceae, subfamily Tillandsioideae. The genus is named for Racine Foster, wife of Mulford B. Foster and co-founder of the BSI. It is found in tropical regions of the Americas.

== Species ==
Species accepted by the Plants of the World Online as of October 2022:

- Racinaea adpressa (André) J.R.Grant
- Racinaea aeris-incola (Mez) M.A.Spencer & L.B.Sm.
- Racinaea almeriae (Rauh) J.R.Grant
- Racinaea blassii (L.B.Sm.) M.A.Spencer & L.B.Sm.
- Racinaea commixa (Mez) M.A.Spencer & L.B.Sm.
- Racinaea condorensis Manzan. & Gouda
- Racinaea contorta (Mez & Pittier) M.A.Spencer & L.B.Sm.
- Racinaea cresporum Manzan.
- Racinaea crispa (Baker) M.A.Spencer & L.B.Sm.
- Racinaea cuspidata (L.B.Sm.) M.A.Spencer & L.B.Sm.
- Racinaea dielsii (Harms) H.Luther
- Racinaea diffusa (L.B.Sm.) M.A.Spencer & L.B.Sm.
- Racinaea domingosmartinis (Rauh) J.R.Grant
- Racinaea dyeriana (André) Barfuss & W.Till
- Racinaea elegans (L.B.Sm.) M.A.Spencer & L.B.Sm.
- Racinaea euryelytra J.R.Grant
- Racinaea fawcettii (Mez) M.A.Spencer & L.B.Sm.
- Racinaea filifolia Gouda
- Racinaea flexuosa (Baker) M.A.Spencer & L.B.Sm.
- Racinaea fraseri (Baker) M.A.Spencer & L.B.Sm.
- Racinaea gentryana Manzan. & W.Till
- Racinaea ghiesbreghtii (Baker) M.A.Spencer & L.B.Sm.
- Racinaea gilmartiniae (L.B.Sm.) M.A.Spencer & L.B.Sm.
- Racinaea goudae Manzan. & W.Till
- Racinaea grantii Manzan. & W.Till
- Racinaea guacamayosensis Manzan. & Gouda
- Racinaea hamaleana (É.Morren) Barfuss & W.Till
- Racinaea hasei Höpfel & Scharf
- Racinaea hauggiae (Rauh) J.R.Grant
- Racinaea homostachya (André) M.A.Spencer & L.B.Sm.
- Racinaea inconspicua (André) M.A.Spencer & L.B.Sm.
- Racinaea insularis (Mez) M.A.Spencer & L.B.Sm.
- Racinaea jaramilloi Manzan.
- Racinaea jenmanii (Baker) M.A.Spencer & L.B.Sm.
- Racinaea kalliantha J.R.Grant
- Racinaea kessleri H.Luther
- Racinaea laminata (L.B.Sm.) M.A.Spencer & L.B.Sm.
- Racinaea lescaillei (C.Wright) M.A.Spencer & L.B.Sm.
- Racinaea lutheri Manzan. & W.Till
- Racinaea lymansmithiana J.R.Grant
- Racinaea macrantha H.Luther
- Racinaea marioportillae Höpfel & Scharf
- Racinaea membranacifolia (L.B.Sm.) M.A.Spencer & L.B.Sm.
- Racinaea michelii (Mez) M.A.Spencer & L.B.Sm.
- Racinaea monticola (Mez & Sodiro) M.A.Spencer & L.B.Sm.
- Racinaea multiflora (Benth.) M.A.Spencer & L.B.Sm.
- Racinaea neillii Manzan.
- Racinaea nervibractea (Gilmartin & H.Luther) J.R.Grant
- Racinaea pallidoflavens (Mez) M.A.Spencer & L.B.Sm.
- Racinaea pardina (L.B.Sm.) M.A.Spencer & L.B.Sm.
- Racinaea parviflora (Ruiz & Pav.) M.A.Spencer & L.B.Sm.
- Racinaea pattersoniae Manzan. & W.Till
- Racinaea pectinata (André) M.A.Spencer & L.B.Sm.
- Racinaea penduliflora Gouda & Manzan.
- Racinaea pendulispica (Mez) M.A.Spencer & L.B.Sm.
- Racinaea penlandii (L.B.Sm.) M.A.Spencer & L.B.Sm.
- Racinaea pseudotetrantha (Gilmartin & H.Luther) J.R.Grant
- Racinaea pugiformis (L.B.Sm.) M.A.Spencer & L.B.Sm.
- Racinaea pulchella (André) Gouda & Manzan.
- Racinaea quadripinnata (Mez & Sodiro) M.A.Spencer & L.B.Sm.
- Racinaea riocreuxii (André) M.A.Spencer & L.B.Sm.
- Racinaea ropalocarpa (André) M.A.Spencer & L.B.Sm.
- Racinaea rothschuhiana (Mez) M.A.Spencer & L.B.Sm.
- Racinaea sanctae-martae (L.B.Sm.) M.A.Spencer & L.B.Sm.
- Racinaea schumanniana (Wittm.) J.R.Grant
- Racinaea schunkei (L.B.Sm.) Gouda
- Racinaea seemannii (Baker) M.A.Spencer & L.B.Sm.
- Racinaea sinuosa (L.B.Sm.) M.A.Spencer & L.B.Sm.
- Racinaea spiculosa (Griseb.) M.A.Spencer & L.B.Sm.
- Racinaea steyermarkii (L.B.Sm.) M.A.Spencer & L.B.Sm.
- Racinaea strobeliorum Manzan. & W.Till
- Racinaea subalata (André) M.A.Spencer & L.B.Sm.
- Racinaea tandapiana (H.Luther) M.A.Spencer & L.B.Sm.
- Racinaea tenuispica (André) M.A.Spencer & L.B.Sm.
- Racinaea terrestris Manzan. & Gouda
- Racinaea tetrantha (Ruiz & Pav.) M.A.Spencer & L.B.Sm.
- Racinaea tillii Manzan. & Gouda
- Racinaea trapeziformis (Mez) M.A.Spencer & L.B.Sm.
- Racinaea tripinnata (Baker) M.A.Spencer & L.B.Sm.
- Racinaea undulifolia (Mez) H.Luther
- Racinaea venusta (Mez & Wercklé) Barfuss & W.Till
- Racinaea wuelfinghoffii Höpfel & Scharf
- Racinaea zingleri Höpfel & Scharf
