= Pitcairnia pruinosa =

Scientific classification
- Kingdom: Plantae
- Clade: Tracheophytes
- Clade: Angiosperms
- Clade: Monocots
- Clade: Commelinids
- Order: Poales
- Family: Bromeliaceae
- Genus: Pitcairnia
- Subgenus: Pitcairnia subg. Pepinia
- Species: P. pruinosa

Binomial name
- Pitcairnia pruinosa Kunth

Synonyms
- Hepetis pruinosa (Kunth) Mez, A.L.P.P.de Candolle & A.C.P.de Candolle; Pepinia pruinosa (Kunth) G.S.Varad. & Gilmartin

Species of flowering plant

Pitcairnia pruinosa, synonym Pepinia pruinosa, is a species of flowering plant in the family Bromeliaceae, native to Colombia and Venezuela. It was first described by Carl Sigismund Kunth in 1816.
