= Racinaea domingosmartinis =

Scientific classification
- Kingdom: Plantae
- Clade: Tracheophytes
- Clade: Angiosperms
- Clade: Monocots
- Clade: Commelinids
- Order: Poales
- Family: Bromeliaceae
- Genus: Racinaea
- Species: R. domingosmartinis

Binomial name
- Racinaea domingosmartinis (Rauh) J.R.Grant

Species of flowering plant

Racinaea domingosmartinis is a plant species in the genus Racinaea. This species is endemic to Brazil.
