= Pitcairnia hooveri =

Conservation status
- Endangered (IUCN 3.1)

Scientific classification
- Kingdom: Plantae
- Clade: Tracheophytes
- Clade: Angiosperms
- Clade: Monocots
- Clade: Commelinids
- Order: Poales
- Family: Bromeliaceae
- Genus: Pitcairnia
- Subgenus: Pitcairnia subg. Pepinia
- Species: P. hooveri

Binomial name
- Pitcairnia hooveri (H.Luther) D.C.Taylor & H.Rob.

Synonyms
- Pepinia hooveri H.Luther

Species of flowering plant

Pitcairnia hooveri is a species of flowering plant in the family Bromeliaceae. It was first described by Harry Edward Luther in 1991 as Pepinia hooveri. It is endemic to Ecuador, where it grows in coastal and mountain forest habitats. There are four known subpopulations, none of which is in a protected area.
