= Racinaea adpressa =

Scientific classification
- Kingdom: Plantae
- Clade: Tracheophytes
- Clade: Angiosperms
- Clade: Monocots
- Clade: Commelinids
- Order: Poales
- Family: Bromeliaceae
- Genus: Racinaea
- Species: R. adpressa

Binomial name
- Racinaea adpressa (André) J.R. Grant

Synonyms
- Tillandsia adpressa André; Tillandsia adpressa var. typica L.B.Sm.

Species of plant

Racinaea adpressa is a species of flowering plant in the Bromeliaceae family. It is native to Costa Rica, Venezuela and Ecuador.
