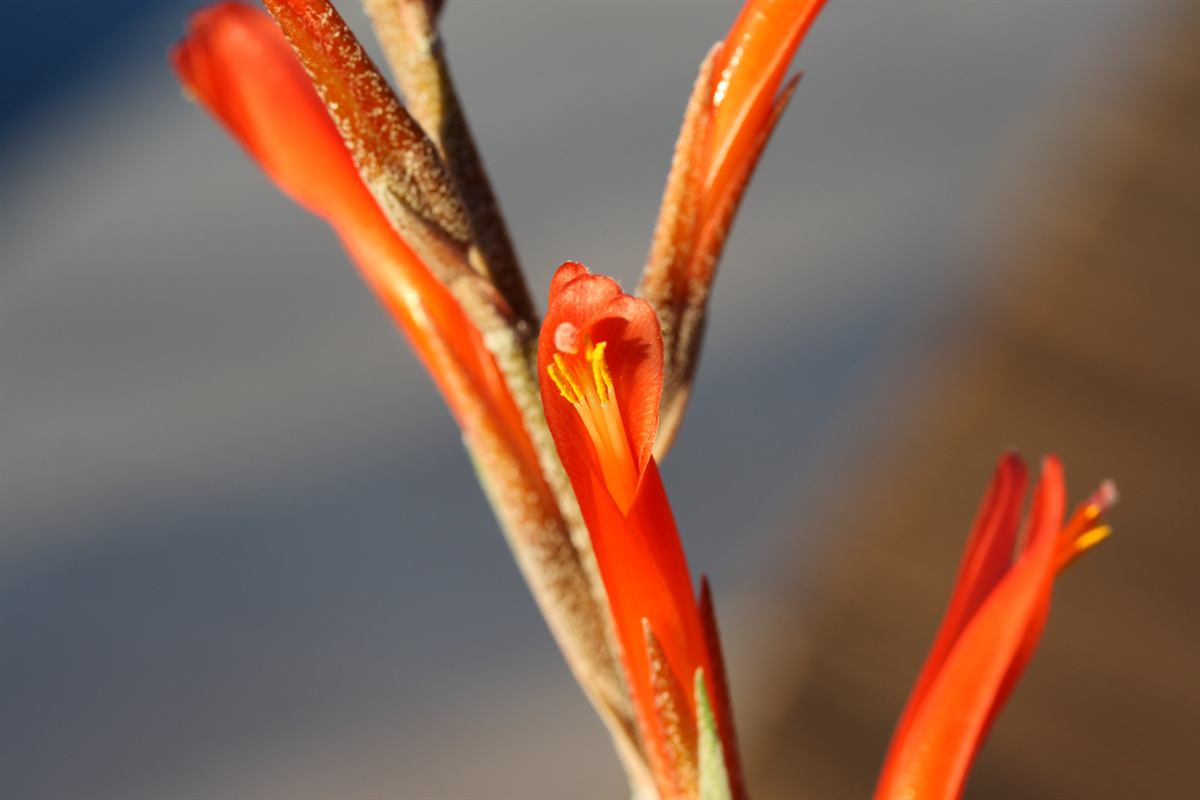

Scientific classification
- Kingdom: Plantae
- Clade: Tracheophytes
- Clade: Angiosperms
- Clade: Monocots
- Clade: Commelinids
- Order: Poales
- Family: Bromeliaceae
- Genus: Pitcairnia
- Subgenus: Pitcairnia subg. Pepinia
- Species: P. caricifolia

Binomial name
- Pitcairnia caricifolia Mart. ex Schult. & Schult.f.

Synonyms
- Hepetis caricifolia (Mart. ex Schult. & Schult.f.) Mez Pepinia caricifolia (Mart. ex Schult. & Schult.f.) G.S.Varad. & Gilmartin

= Pitcairnia caricifolia =

Species of flowering plant

Pitcairnia caricifolia, synonym Pepinia caricifolia, is a species of flowering plant in the family Bromeliaceae. This species is native to tropical South America.
