= Pitcairnia carnososepala =

Conservation status
- Vulnerable (IUCN 3.1)

Scientific classification
- Kingdom: Plantae
- Clade: Tracheophytes
- Clade: Angiosperms
- Clade: Monocots
- Clade: Commelinids
- Order: Poales
- Family: Bromeliaceae
- Genus: Pitcairnia
- Subgenus: Pitcairnia subg. Pepinia
- Species: P. carnososepala

Binomial name
- Pitcairnia carnososepala Rauh & E.Gross

Synonyms
- Pepinia carnososepala (Rauh & E.Gross) H.Luther

Species of flowering plant

Pitcairnia carnososepala, synonym Pepinia carnososepala, is a species of flowering plant in the family Bromeliaceae, endemic to Ecuador. It was first described by Werner Rauh and Elvira Angela Gross in 1987. Its natural habitats are subtropical or tropical moist lowland forests and subtropical or tropical moist montane forests. It is threatened by habitat loss.
