= Racinaea euryelytra =

Conservation status
- Vulnerable (IUCN 3.1)

Scientific classification
- Kingdom: Plantae
- Clade: Tracheophytes
- Clade: Angiosperms
- Clade: Monocots
- Clade: Commelinids
- Order: Poales
- Family: Bromeliaceae
- Genus: Racinaea
- Species: R. euryelytra

Binomial name
- Racinaea euryelytra J.R.Grant

Species of flowering plant

Racinaea euryelytra is a species of plant in the family Bromeliaceae. It is endemic to Ecuador. Its natural habitat is subtropical or tropical high-altitude shrubland. It is threatened by habitat loss.
