= Racinaea kessleri =

Scientific classification
- Kingdom: Plantae
- Clade: Tracheophytes
- Clade: Angiosperms
- Clade: Monocots
- Clade: Commelinids
- Order: Poales
- Family: Bromeliaceae
- Genus: Racinaea
- Species: R. kessleri

Binomial name
- Racinaea kessleri H.Luther

Species of flowering plant

Racinaea kessleri is a plant species in the genus Racinaea. This species is endemic to Bolivia.
