= Racinaea inconspicua =

Conservation status
- Endangered (IUCN 3.1)

Scientific classification
- Kingdom: Plantae
- Clade: Tracheophytes
- Clade: Angiosperms
- Clade: Monocots
- Clade: Commelinids
- Order: Poales
- Family: Bromeliaceae
- Genus: Racinaea
- Species: R. inconspicua

Binomial name
- Racinaea inconspicua (Andrè) M.A.Spencer & L.B.Sm.

Species of flowering plant

Racinaea inconspicua is a species of plant in the family Bromeliaceae. It is endemic to Ecuador. Its natural habitat is subtropical or tropical moist montane forests. It is threatened by habitat loss.
