= Racinaea pseudotetrantha =

Conservation status
- Near Threatened (IUCN 3.1)

Scientific classification
- Kingdom: Plantae
- Clade: Tracheophytes
- Clade: Angiosperms
- Clade: Monocots
- Clade: Commelinids
- Order: Poales
- Family: Bromeliaceae
- Genus: Racinaea
- Species: R. pseudotetrantha

Binomial name
- Racinaea pseudotetrantha (Gilmartin & H.Luther) J.R.Grant

Species of flowering plant

Racinaea pseudotetrantha is a species of plant in the family Bromeliaceae. It is endemic to Ecuador. Its natural habitat is subtropical or tropical dry forests. It is threatened by habitat loss.
