= Racinaea venusta =

Scientific classification
- Kingdom: Plantae
- Clade: Embryophytes
- Clade: Tracheophytes
- Clade: Spermatophytes
- Clade: Angiosperms
- Clade: Monocots
- Clade: Commelinids
- Order: Poales
- Family: Bromeliaceae
- Genus: Racinaea
- Species: R. venusta

Binomial name
- Racinaea venusta (Mez & Wercklé) Barfuss & W.Till

Synonyms
- Tillandsia venusta Mez & Wercklé.

Species of plant

Racinaea venusta is a species of flowering plant in the famuily Bromeliaceae. This species is native from Costa Rica to Ecuador.
