= Pitcairnia harrylutheri =

Conservation status
- Vulnerable (IUCN 3.1)

Scientific classification
- Kingdom: Plantae
- Clade: Tracheophytes
- Clade: Angiosperms
- Clade: Monocots
- Clade: Commelinids
- Order: Poales
- Family: Bromeliaceae
- Genus: Pitcairnia
- Subgenus: Pitcairnia subg. Pepinia
- Species: P. harrylutheri

Binomial name
- Pitcairnia harrylutheri D.C.Taylor & H.Rob.

Synonyms
- Pepinia fulgens H.Luther

Species of flowering plant

Pitcairnia harrylutheri is a species of flowering plant in the family Bromeliaceae, endemic to Ecuador. It was first described by Harry Edward Luther in 1991 as Pepinia fulgens. When transferred to the genus Pitcairnia in 1999, the epithet had to be changed, as the name Pitcairnia fulgens had already been used. Pitcairnia harrylutheri is a replacement name. The natural habitats of the species are subtropical or tropical moist lowland forests and subtropical or tropical moist montane forests. It is threatened by habitat loss.
