= Pitcairnia aphelandriflora =

Scientific classification
- Kingdom: Plantae
- Clade: Tracheophytes
- Clade: Angiosperms
- Clade: Monocots
- Clade: Commelinids
- Order: Poales
- Family: Bromeliaceae
- Genus: Pitcairnia
- Subgenus: Pitcairnia subg. Pepinia
- Species: P. aphelandriflora

Binomial name
- Pitcairnia aphelandriflora Lem.

Synonyms
- Hepetis aphelandriflora (Lem.) Mez; Pepinia aphelandriflora (Lem.) Andrews

Species of flowering plant

Pitcairnia aphelandriflora is a species of flowering plant in the family Bromeliaceae, native to Panama, Ecuador and Peru. It was first described by Charles Antoine Lemaire in 1869.
