= Pitcairnia leopoldii =

Scientific classification
- Kingdom: Plantae
- Clade: Tracheophytes
- Clade: Angiosperms
- Clade: Monocots
- Clade: Commelinids
- Order: Poales
- Family: Bromeliaceae
- Genus: Pitcairnia
- Subgenus: Pitcairnia subg. Pepinia
- Species: P. leopoldii

Binomial name
- Pitcairnia leopoldii (W.Till & S.Till) B.Holst

Synonyms
- Pepinia leopoldii W.Till & S.Till

Species of flowering plant

Pitcairnia leopoldii is a species of flowering plant in the family Bromeliaceae, endemic to Venezuela. It was first described in 1994 as Pepinia leopoldii.
