= Racinaea crispa =

Scientific classification
- Kingdom: Plantae
- Clade: Tracheophytes
- Clade: Angiosperms
- Clade: Monocots
- Clade: Commelinids
- Order: Poales
- Family: Bromeliaceae
- Genus: Racinaea
- Species: R. crispa

Binomial name
- Racinaea crispa (Baker) M.A. Spencer & L.B. Smith

Species of flowering plant

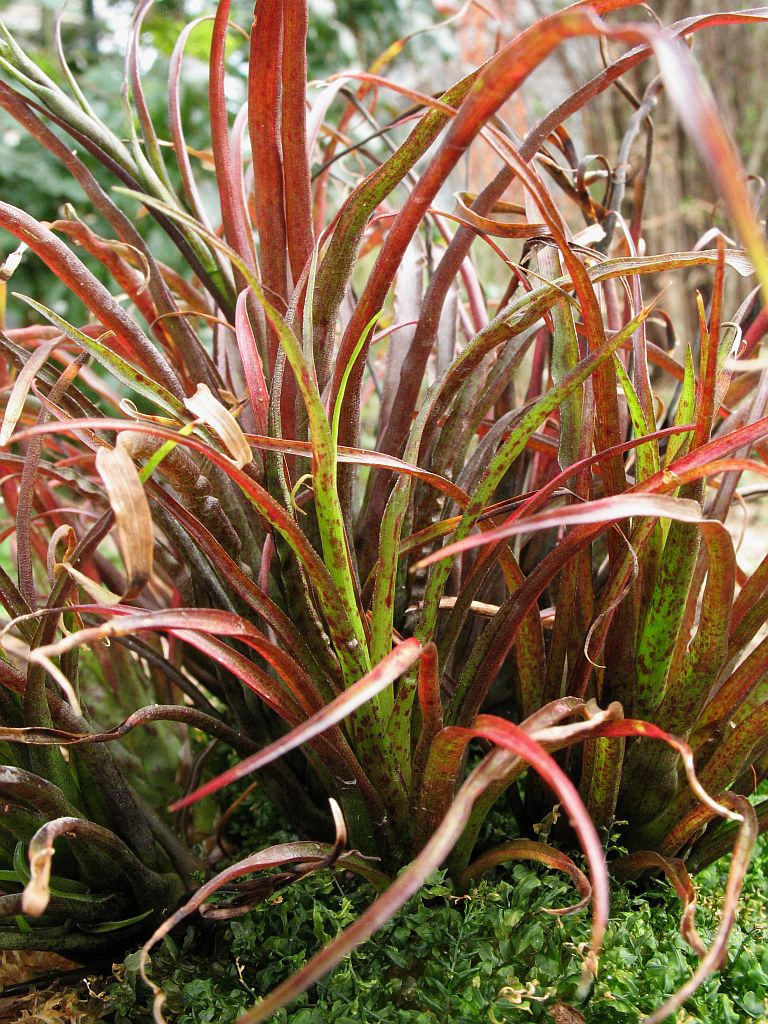
Racinaea crispa in cultivation at the Botanical Garden of Heidelberg, Germany

Racinaea crispa is a plant species in the genus Racinaea.

== Cultivars ==
- x Racindsia 'La Mano Magica'
