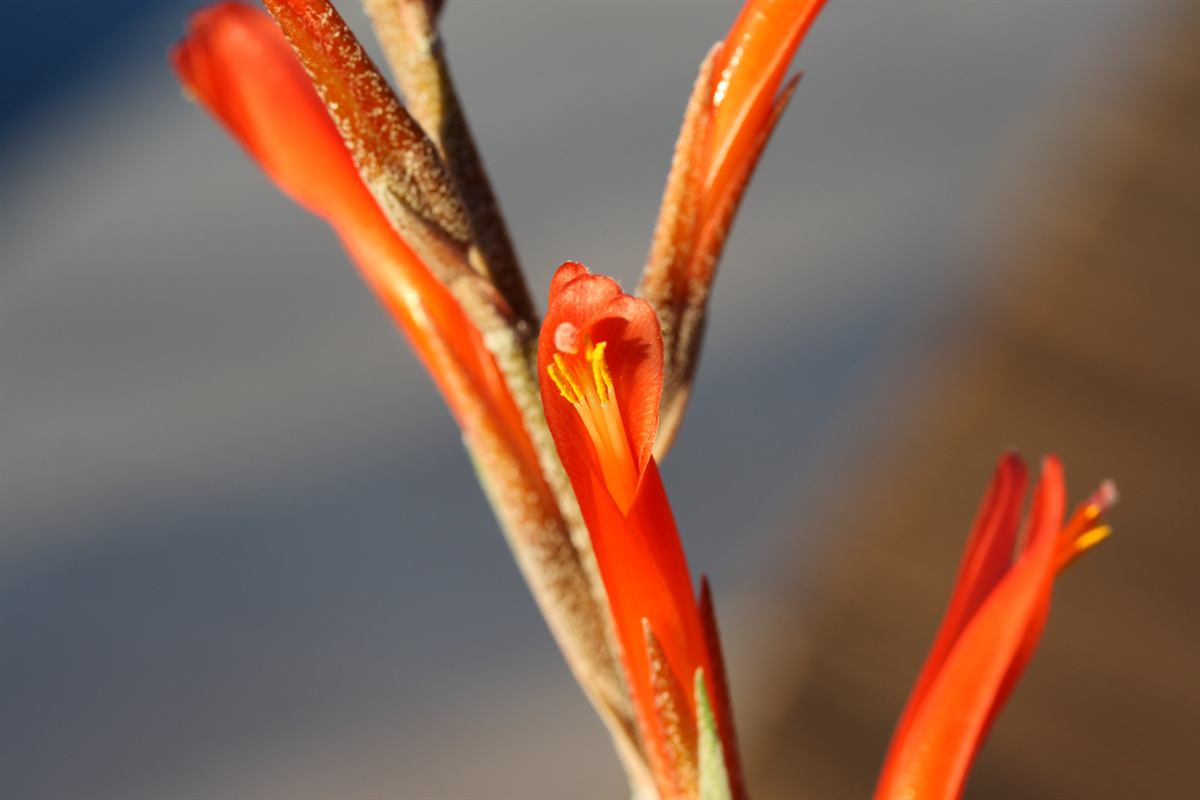
- Pitcairnia caricifolia

Scientific classification
- Kingdom: Plantae
- Clade: Tracheophytes
- Clade: Angiosperms
- Clade: Monocots
- Clade: Commelinids
- Order: Poales
- Family: Bromeliaceae
- Genus: Pitcairnia
- Subgenus: Pitcairnia subg. Pepinia (Brongn. ex André) Baker

Species
- See text.

Synonyms
- Pepinia Brongn. ex André

= Pitcairnia subg. Pepinia =

Genus of flowering plants

Pitcairnia subg. Pepinia is a subgenus of plants in the family Bromeliaceae. It has at times been treated as the separate genus Pepinia, but is now included again in the genus Pitcairnia. The name is for Pierre Denis Pépin, French member of the Imperial and Central Society of Agriculture (c.1802-1876).

== Taxonomy ==
Pepinia was established as a genus in 1870 by Adolphe-Théodore Brongniart in a publication by Édouard André. Pepinia was reduced to a subgenus of Pitcairnia in 1881 by John Gilbert Baker, but elevated again to a genus in 1988, largely on the basis of the morphology of its seeds. The use of morphological characters to differentiate Pepinia from Pitcairnia was rejected in 1999; a view later confirmed by multiple molecular studies.

=== Selected species ===
Species that have been placed in Pepinia and are now placed in Pitcairnia subg. Pepinia include:

- Pepinia agavifolia (L.B.Sm.) G.S.Varad. & Gilmartin = Pitcairnia agavifolia
- Pepinia alborubra (Baker) G.S.Varad. & Gilmartin = Pitcairnia alborubra
- Pepinia alexanderi H.Luther = Pitcairnia alexanderi
- Pepinia amblyosperma (L.B.Sm.) G.S.Varad. & Gilmartin = Pitcairnia amblyosperma
- Pepinia aphelandriflora (Lemaire) André = Pitcairnia aphelandriflora
- Pepinia armata (Maury) G.S.Varad. & Gilmartin = Pitcairnia armata
- Pepinia beachiae (J. Utley & Burt-Utley) H.Luther = Pitcairnia beachiae
- Pepinia bulbosa (L.B.Sm.) G.S.Varad. & Gilmartin = Pitcairnia bulbosa
- Pepinia caricifolia (Martius ex Schultes f.) G.S.Varad. & Gilmartin = Pitcairnia caricifolia
- Pepinia carnososepala (Rauh & E. Gross) H.Luther = Pitcairnia carnososepala
- Pepinia corallina (Linden & André) G.S.Varad. & Gilmartin = Pitcairnia corallina
- Pepinia ctenophylla (L.B.Sm.) G.S.Varad. & Gilmartin = Pitcairnia ctenophylla
- Pepinia cuatrecasasiana (L.B.Sm.) G.S.Varad. & Gilmartin = Pitcairnia cuatrecasasiana
- Pepinia epiphytica (L.B.Sm.) G.S.Varad. & Gilmartin = Pitcairnia epiphytica
- Pepinia filispina (L.B.Sm.) G.S.Varad. & Gilmartin = Pitcairnia filispina
- Pepinia fulgens H.Luther = Pitcairnia harrylutheri
- Pepinia harlingii (L.B.Sm.) G.S.Varad. & Gilmartin = Pitcairnia harlingii
- Pepinia hooveri H.Luther = Pitcairnia hooveri
- Pepinia juncoides (L.B.Sm.) G.S.Varad. & Gilmartin = Pitcairnia juncoides
- Pepinia kunhardtiana (L.B.Sm.) G.S.Varad. & Gilmartin = Pitcairnia kunhardtiana
- Pepinia leopoldii W.Till & S.Till = Pitcairnia leopoldii
- Pepinia maguirei (L.B.Sm.) G.S.Varad. & Gilmartin = Pitcairnia maguirei
- Pepinia patentiflora (L.B.Sm.) G.S.Varad. & Gilmartin = Pitcairnia patentiflora
- Pepinia pruinosa Kunth = Pitcairnia pruinosa
- Pepinia punicea (Scheidweiler) Brongniart ex André = Pitcairnia punicea
- Pepinia rubiginosa (Baker) G.S.Varad. & Gilmartin = Pitcairnia rubiginosa
- Pepinia sanguinea H.Luther = Pitcairnia sanguinea
- Pepinia turbinella (L.B.Sm.) G.S.Varad. & Gilmartin = Pitcairnia turbinella
- Pepinia uaupensis (Baker) G.S.Varad. & Gilmartin = Pitcairnia uaupensis
- Pepinia verrucosa E. Gross = Pitcairnia elvirae
