= Pitcairnia rubiginosa =

Scientific classification
- Kingdom: Plantae
- Clade: Tracheophytes
- Clade: Angiosperms
- Clade: Monocots
- Clade: Commelinids
- Order: Poales
- Family: Bromeliaceae
- Genus: Pitcairnia
- Subgenus: Pitcairnia subg. Pepinia
- Species: P. rubiginosa

Binomial name
- Pitcairnia rubiginosa Baker

Synonyms
- Hepetis rubiginosa (Baker) Mez; Pepinia rubiginosa (Baker) G.S.Varad. & Gilmartin

Species of flowering plant

Pitcairnia rubiginosa is a species of flowering plant in the family Bromeliaceae, native to northern South America (northern Brazil, Colombia, French Guiana, Guyana and Venezuela). It was first described by John Gilbert Baker in 1889.
