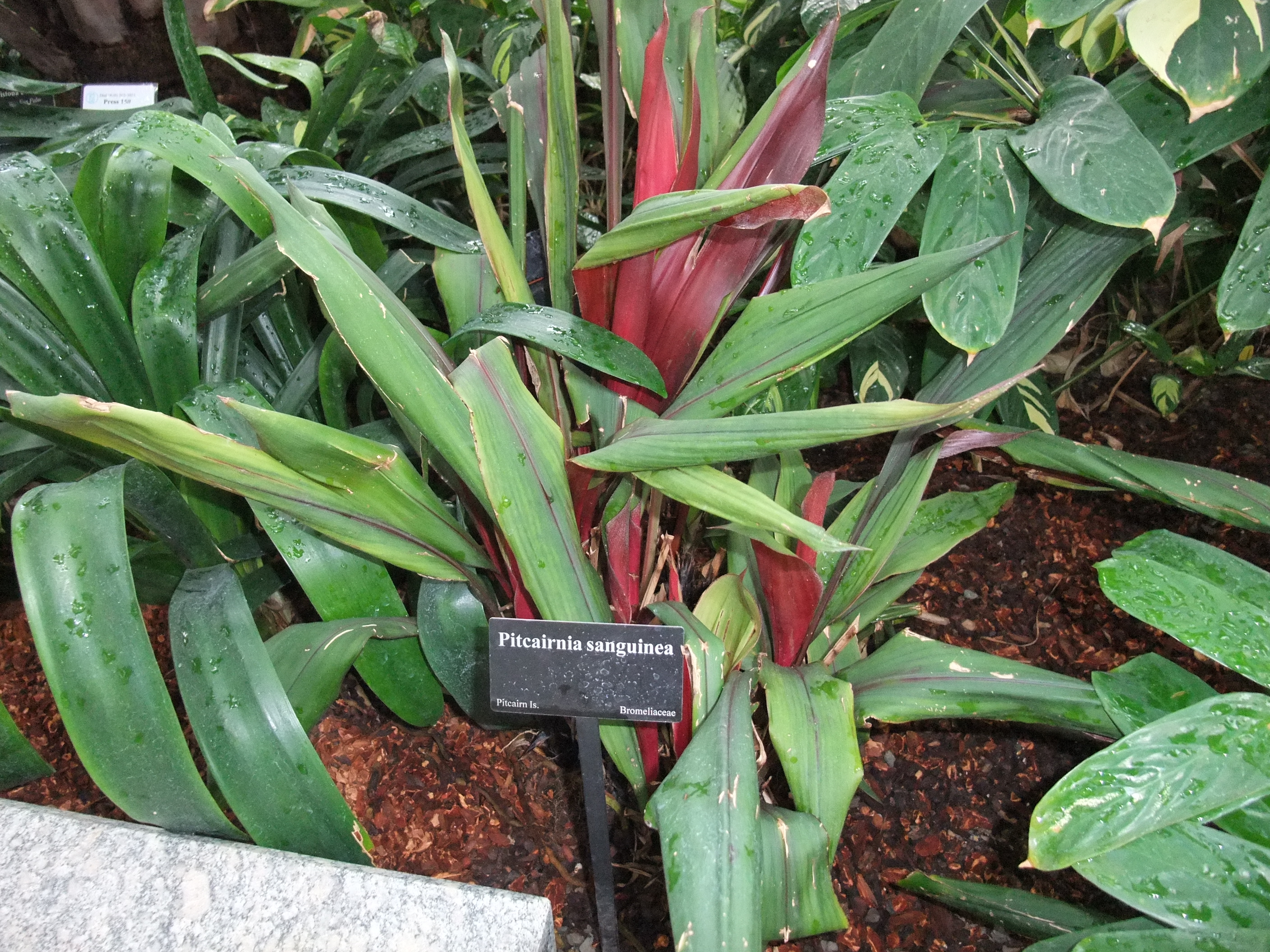

Scientific classification
- Kingdom: Plantae
- Clade: Tracheophytes
- Clade: Angiosperms
- Clade: Monocots
- Clade: Commelinids
- Order: Poales
- Family: Bromeliaceae
- Genus: Pitcairnia
- Subgenus: Pitcairnia subg. Pepinia
- Species: P. sanguinea

Binomial name
- Pitcairnia sanguinea (H.Luther) D.C.Taylor & H.Rob.

Synonyms
- Pepinia sanguinea H.Luther

= Pitcairnia sanguinea =

Species of flowering plant

Pitcairnia sanguinea is a species of plant in the family Bromeliaceae. It was previously classified as Pepinia sanguinea before it was moved to the genus Pitcairnia.
