= Lyman Bradford Smith =

American botanist

- Born: September 11, 1904; Winchester, Massachusetts, USA
- Died: May 4, 1997 (aged 92); Manhattan, Kansas, USA
- Education: Harvard University
- Spouse: Ruth Carlisle Gates (m. 1929)
- Scientific career
- Fields: Botany
- Workplaces: Smithsonian Institution
- Author abbrev. (botany): L.B.Sm

Lyman Bradford Smith (September 11, 1904 – May 4, 1997) was an American botanist.

Smith was born in Winchester, Massachusetts. He studied botany during the 1920s at Harvard University and received his PhD from Harvard in 1930. Between 1928 and 1929, he worked for the first time in Brazil. Most of his life's work came to involve the taxonomy of the flowering plants of South America, in particular the bromeliads (Bromeliaceae). Smith worked on the Bromeliaceae for the North American Flora published by the American botanist Nathaniel Lord Britton, volume 19, no. 2 (1938). Smith was a world authority on Begoniaceae and also worked with Velloziaceae and numerous other plant families. He was a curator in the Smithsonian Institution's Department of Botany from 1947 until his retirement in 1974, but continued to work in the United States National Herbarium as an emeritus curator almost until his death in Manhattan, Kansas, in 1997.

== Works ==
This list may be incomplete.

- The Bromeliaceae of Brazil, 1955
- The Bromeliaceae of Colombia, 1957
- Begoniaceae, 1986
