= D. ferruginea =

D. ferruginea may refer to:

- Dryandra ferruginea, a synonym for Banksia rufa, a plant species
- Drymophila ferruginea, the ferruginous antbird, a bird species endemic to Brazil
- Dyckia ferruginea, a plant species native to Bolivia

== See also ==
- Ferruginea (disambiguation)
