= D. crocea =

D. crocea may refer to:

- Dahlia crocea, a perennial plant
- Dipoena crocea, a tangle-web spider
- Diversidoris crocea, a sea slug
- Dyckia crocea, a plant native to Brazil
