= Dyckia selloa =

Scientific classification
- Kingdom: Plantae
- Clade: Tracheophytes
- Clade: Angiosperms
- Clade: Monocots
- Clade: Commelinids
- Order: Poales
- Family: Bromeliaceae
- Genus: Dyckia
- Species: D. selloa

Binomial name
- Dyckia selloa (K.Koch) Baker

Synonyms
- Prionophyllum selloum K.Koch; Dyckia grandifolia Baker; Dyckia macracantha Baker; Dyckia myriostachya Baker

Species of flowering plant

Dyckia selloa is a species of flowering plant in the family Bromeliaceae. This species is endemic to Brazil.
