= Dyckia macedoi =

Scientific classification
- Kingdom: Plantae
- Clade: Tracheophytes
- Clade: Angiosperms
- Clade: Monocots
- Clade: Commelinids
- Order: Poales
- Family: Bromeliaceae
- Genus: Dyckia
- Species: D. macedoi

Binomial name
- Dyckia macedoi L.B.Sm.

Species of flowering plant

Dyckia macedoi is a plant species in the genus Dyckia. It is endemic to the State of Minas Gerais in Brazil.

== Cultivars ==
- × Dyckcohnia 'Conrad Morton'
