= Dyckia martinellii =

Scientific classification
- Kingdom: Plantae
- Clade: Tracheophytes
- Clade: Angiosperms
- Clade: Monocots
- Clade: Commelinids
- Order: Poales
- Family: Bromeliaceae
- Genus: Dyckia
- Species: D. martinellii

Binomial name
- Dyckia martinellii B.R. Silva & Forzza

Species of flowering plant

Dyckia martinellii is a plant species in the genus Dyckia.

== Distribution ==
The bromeliad is endemic to the Atlantic Forest biome (Mata Atlantica Brasileira) and within Rio de Janeiro state, located in southeast Brazil.
