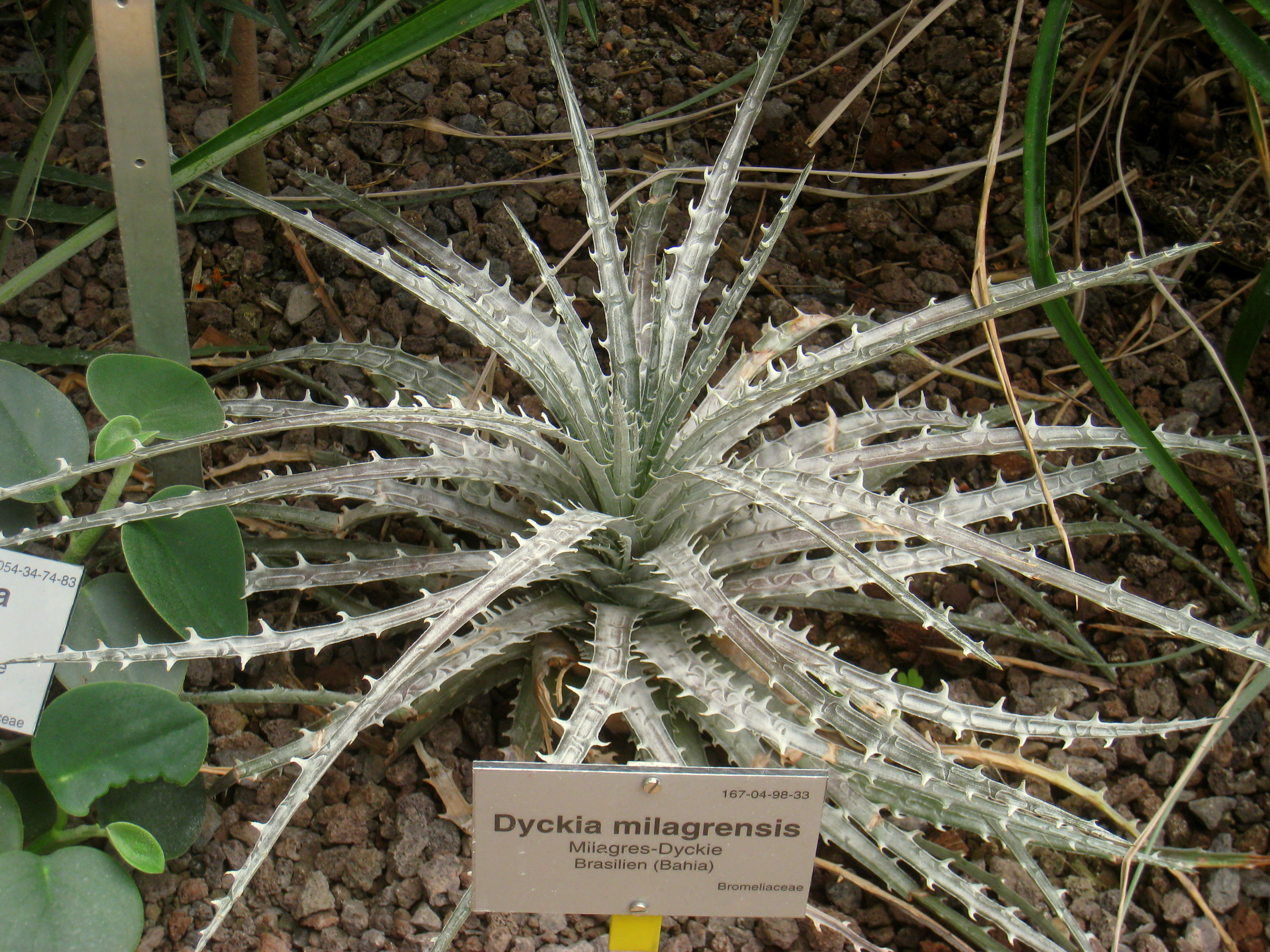

Scientific classification
- Kingdom: Plantae
- Clade: Embryophytes
- Clade: Tracheophytes
- Clade: Angiosperms
- Clade: Monocots
- Clade: Commelinids
- Order: Poales
- Family: Bromeliaceae
- Genus: Dyckia
- Species: D. milagrensis

Binomial name
- Dyckia milagrensis Leme

= Dyckia milagrensis =

Species of flowering plant

Dyckia milagrensis is a plant species of the genus Dyckia, native to Bahia, Brazil.
