= Dyckia dawsonii =

Scientific classification
- Kingdom: Plantae
- Clade: Tracheophytes
- Clade: Angiosperms
- Clade: Monocots
- Clade: Commelinids
- Order: Poales
- Family: Bromeliaceae
- Genus: Dyckia
- Species: D. dawsonii

Binomial name
- Dyckia dawsonii L.B.Sm.

Species of flowering plant

Dyckia dawsonii is a plant species in the genus Dyckia. It is endemic to the State of Goiás in Brazil.

== Cultivars ==
- Dyckia 'Brittle Star'
- Dyckia 'June'
