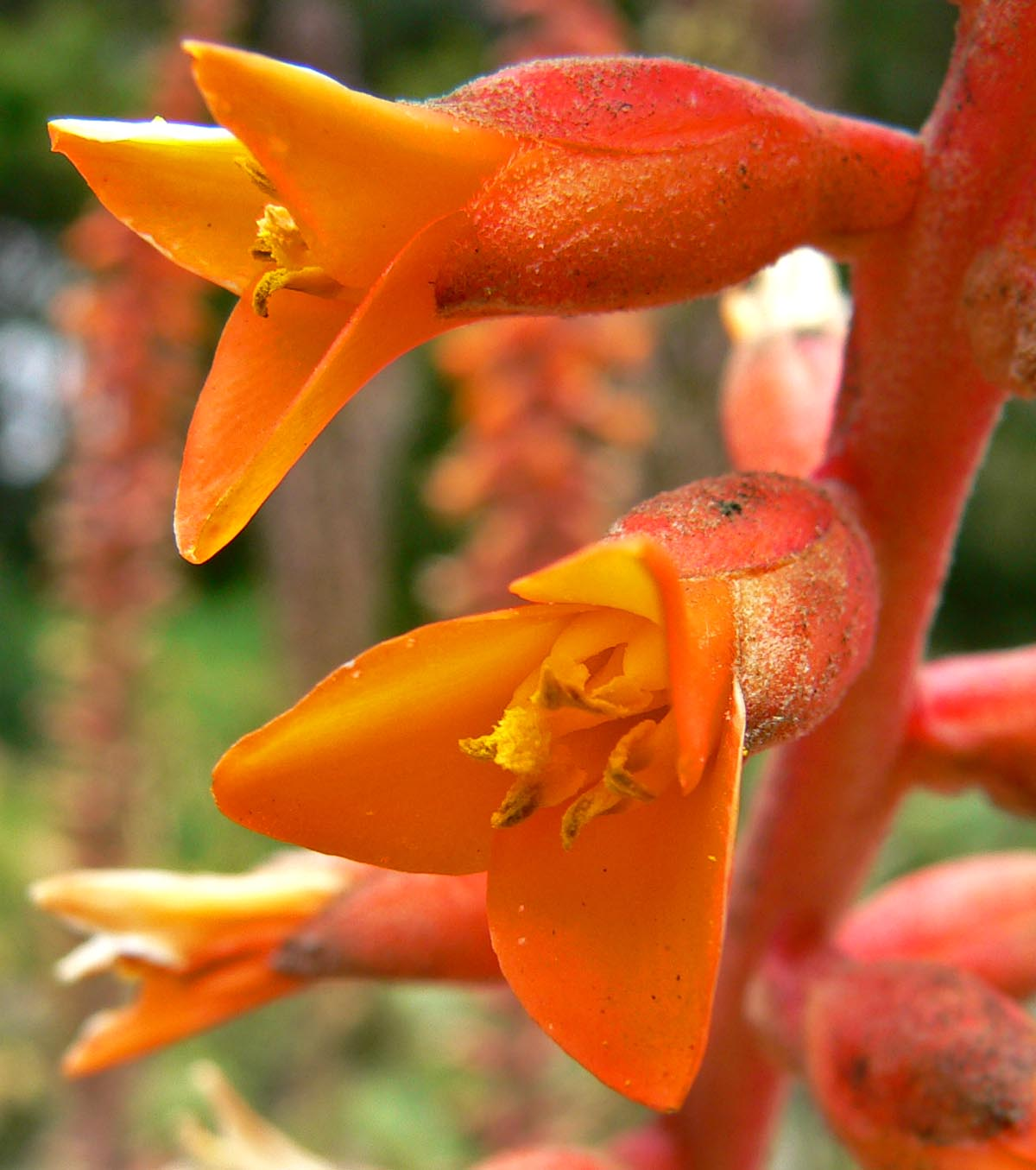

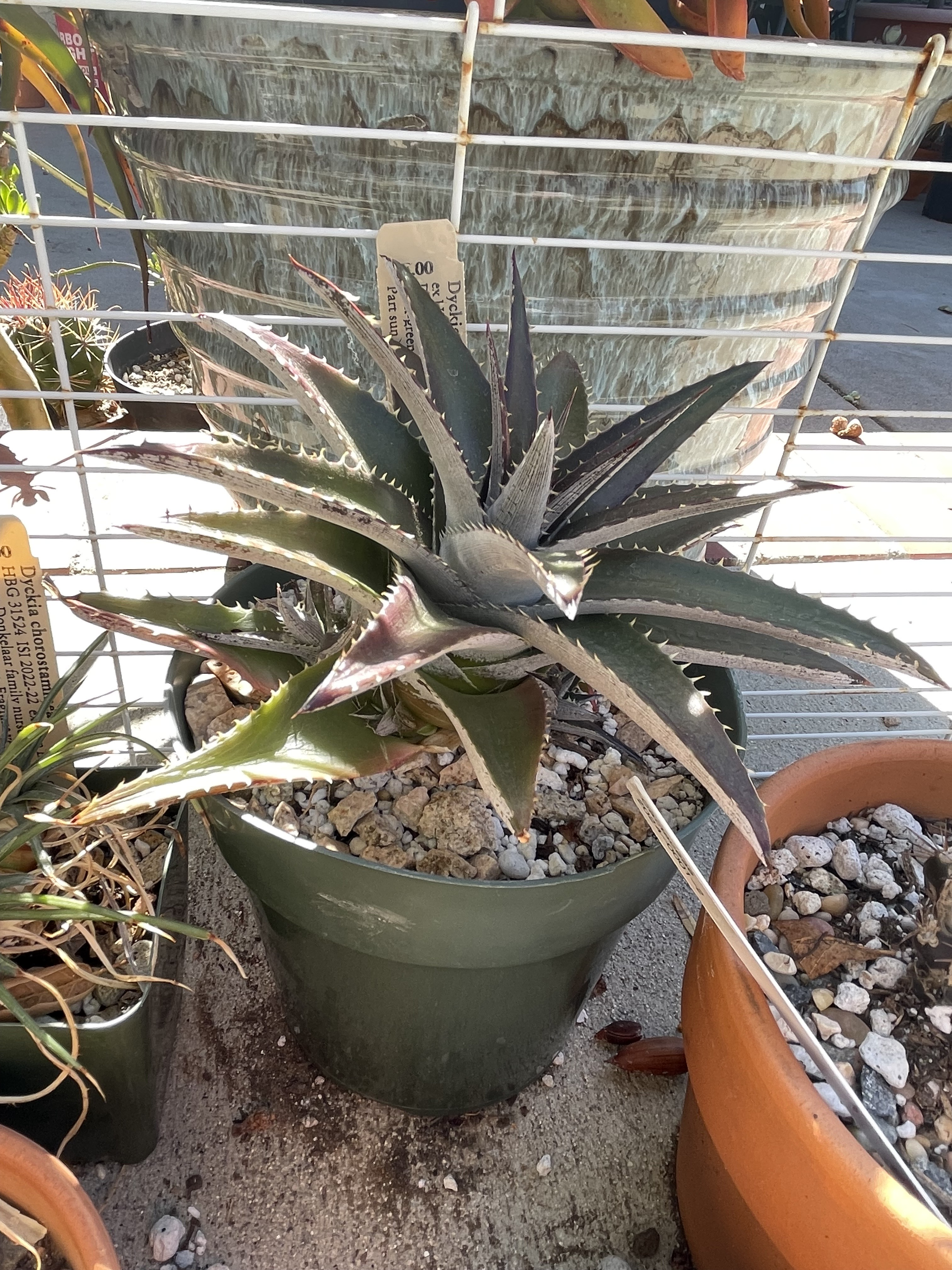

Scientific classification
- Kingdom: Plantae
- Clade: Embryophytes
- Clade: Tracheophytes
- Clade: Spermatophytes
- Clade: Angiosperms
- Clade: Monocots
- Clade: Commelinids
- Order: Poales
- Family: Bromeliaceae
- Genus: Dyckia
- Species: D. platyphylla

Binomial name
- Dyckia platyphylla L.B.Sm.

= Dyckia platyphylla =

Species of flowering plant

Dyckia platyphylla is a plant species in the genus Dyckia. It is endemic to the State of Bahia in eastern Brazil.

== Cultivars ==
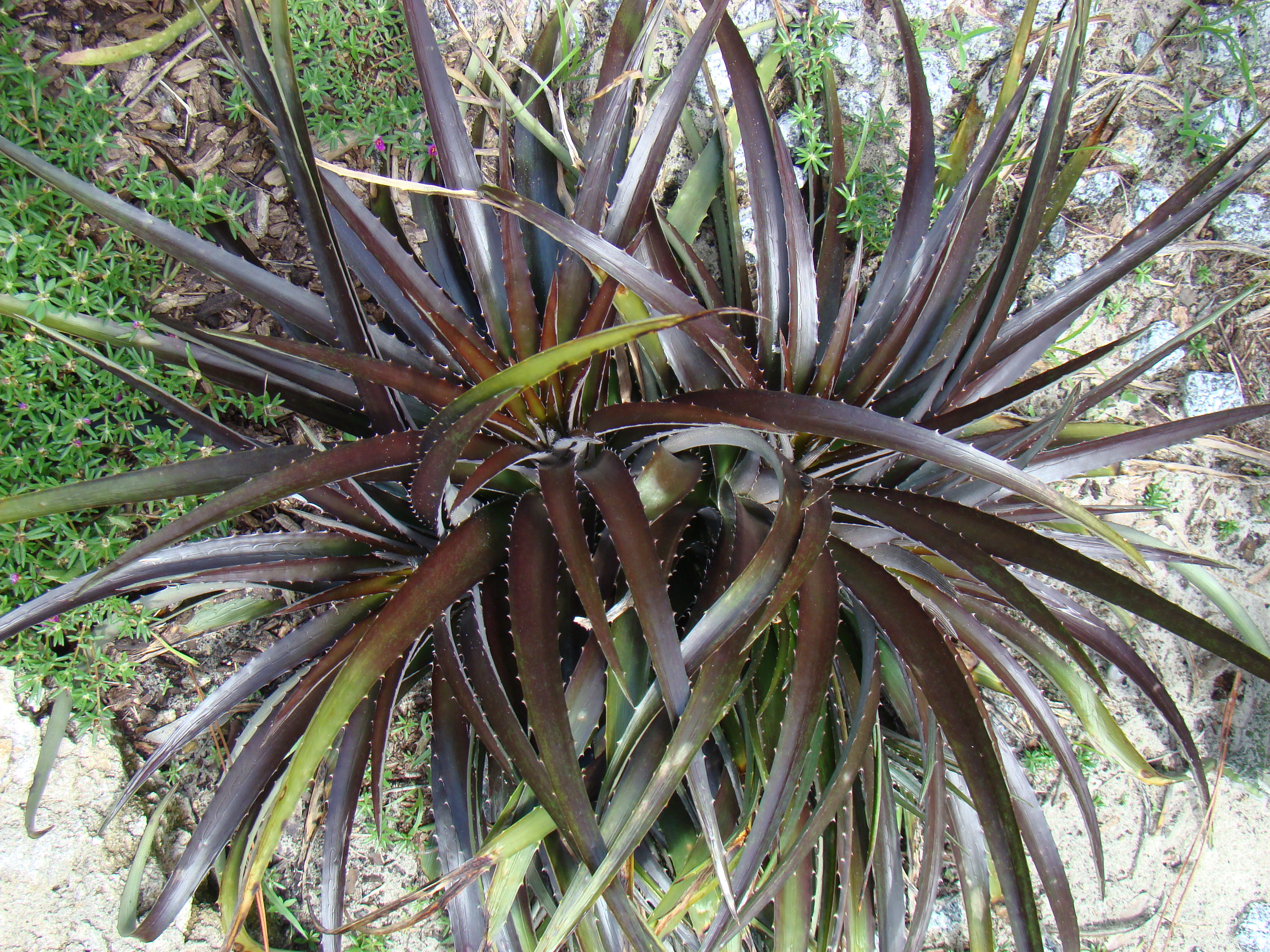
Dyckia 'Cherry Coke'

- Dyckia 'Cherry Coke'
- Dyckia 'Coronet'
- Dyckia 'James Gray'
- Dyckia 'James Green'
- Dyckia 'Picante'
- Dyckia 'Red Devil'
- Dyckia 'Southern Star'
