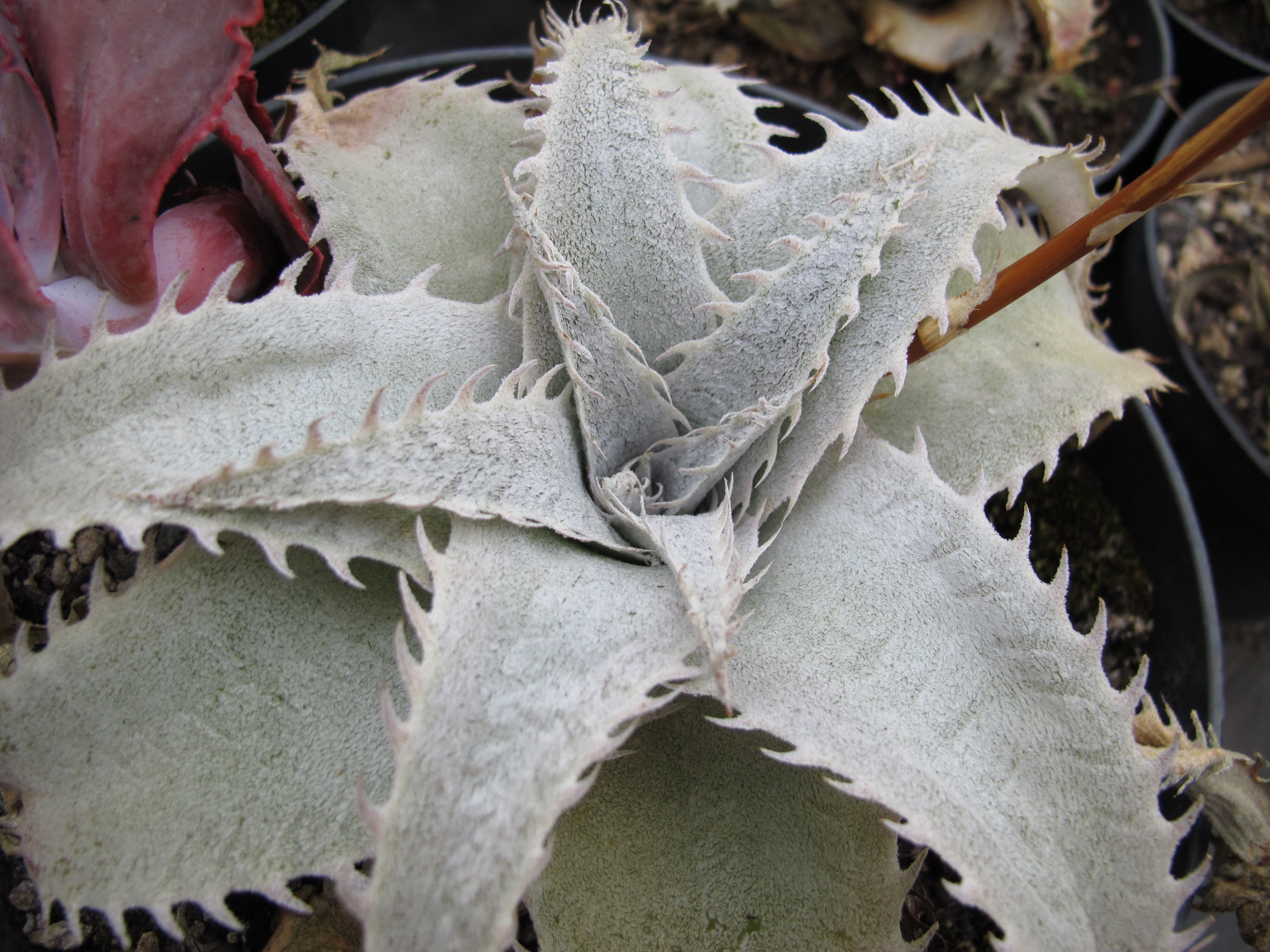

Scientific classification
- Kingdom: Plantae
- Clade: Tracheophytes
- Clade: Angiosperms
- Clade: Monocots
- Clade: Commelinids
- Order: Poales
- Family: Bromeliaceae
- Genus: Dyckia
- Species: D. marnier-lapostollei

Binomial name
- Dyckia marnier-lapostollei L.B.Sm.

= Dyckia marnier-lapostollei =

Species of flowering plant

Dyckia marnier-lapostollei is a plant species in the genus Dyckia, endemic to Brazil.

Two varieties are recognized:

- Dyckia marnier-lapostollei var. estevesii Rauh - Minas Gerais
- Dyckia marnier-lapostollei var. marnier-lapostollei - Minas Gerais, Goiás

== Cultivars ==
- Dyckia 'Brian Chudleigh'
- Dyckia 'Warren'
