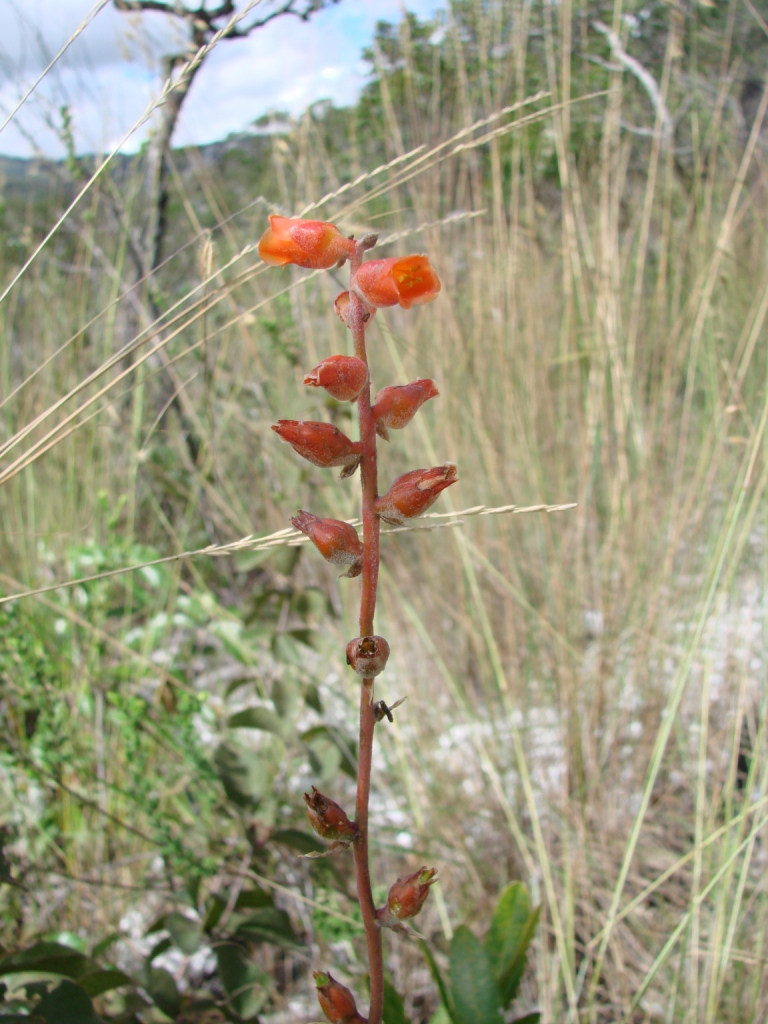

Scientific classification
- Kingdom: Plantae
- Clade: Tracheophytes
- Clade: Angiosperms
- Clade: Monocots
- Clade: Commelinids
- Order: Poales
- Family: Bromeliaceae
- Genus: Dyckia
- Species: D. trichostachya

Binomial name
- Dyckia trichostachya Baker

Synonyms
- Dyckia micracantha Baker

= Dyckia trichostachya =

Species of plant

Dyckia trichostachya is a species of flowering plant in the Bromeliaceae family. This species is endemic to Brazil, and native in Goiás state.
