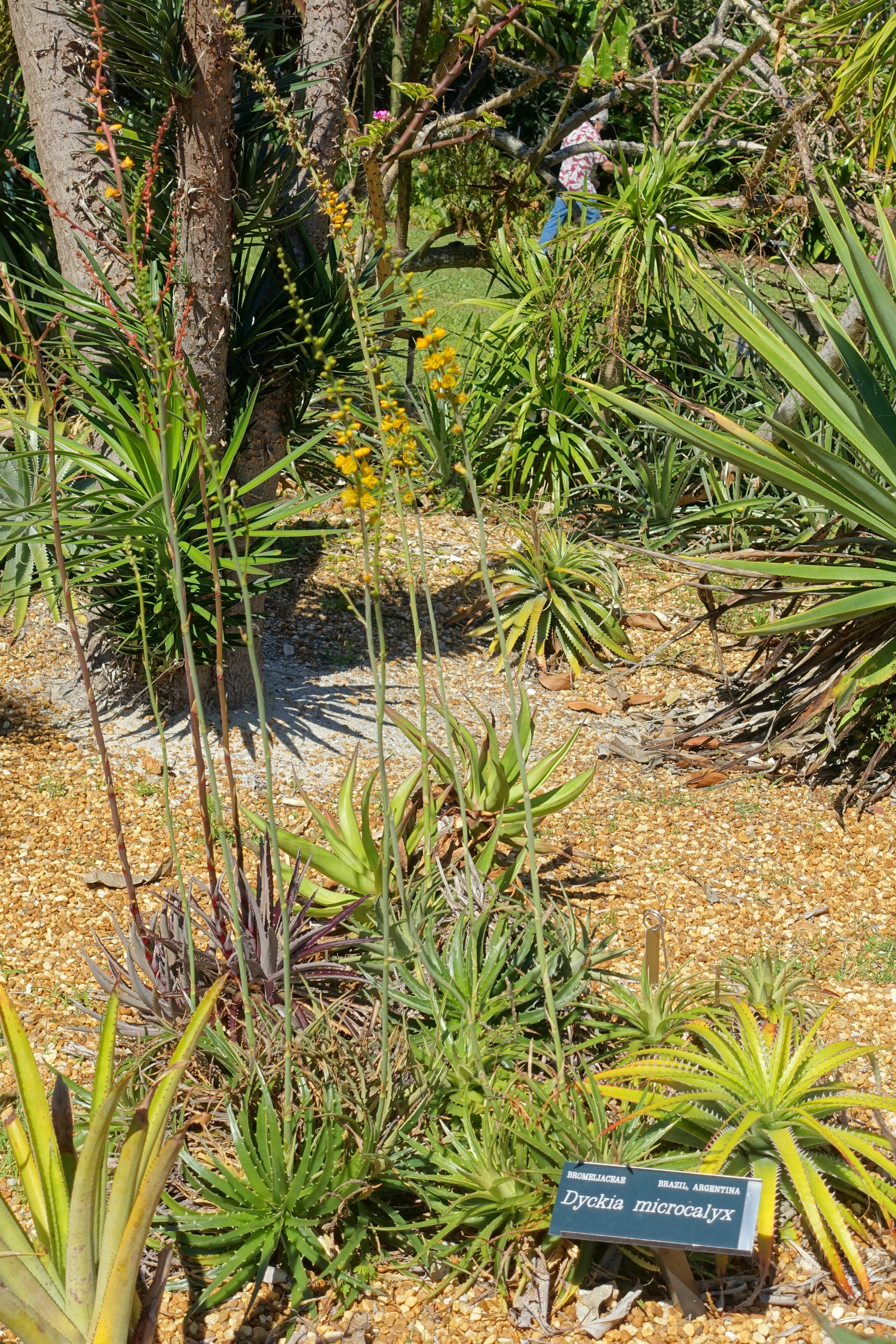

Scientific classification
- Kingdom: Plantae
- Clade: Tracheophytes
- Clade: Angiosperms
- Clade: Monocots
- Clade: Commelinids
- Order: Poales
- Family: Bromeliaceae
- Genus: Dyckia
- Species: D. microcalyx

Binomial name
- Dyckia microcalyx Baker

Synonyms
- Dyckia minutiflora Mez

= Dyckia microcalyx =

Species of flowering plant

Dyckia microcalyx is a species of flowering plant in the Bromeliaceae family. This species is native to Argentina, Paraguay and Brazil.

Two varieties are recognized:

- Dyckia microcalyx var. microcalyx - Paraguay, Mato Grosso do Sul
- Dyckia microcalyx var. ostenii L.B.Sm. - Paraná, Misiones
