= Dyckia cabrerae =

Scientific classification
- Kingdom: Plantae
- Clade: Tracheophytes
- Clade: Angiosperms
- Clade: Monocots
- Clade: Commelinids
- Order: Poales
- Family: Bromeliaceae
- Genus: Dyckia
- Species: D. cabrerae

Binomial name
- Dyckia cabrerae L.B. Smith & Reitz

Species of flowering plant

Dyckia cabrerae is a plant species in the genus Dyckia. This species is endemic to Brazil.
