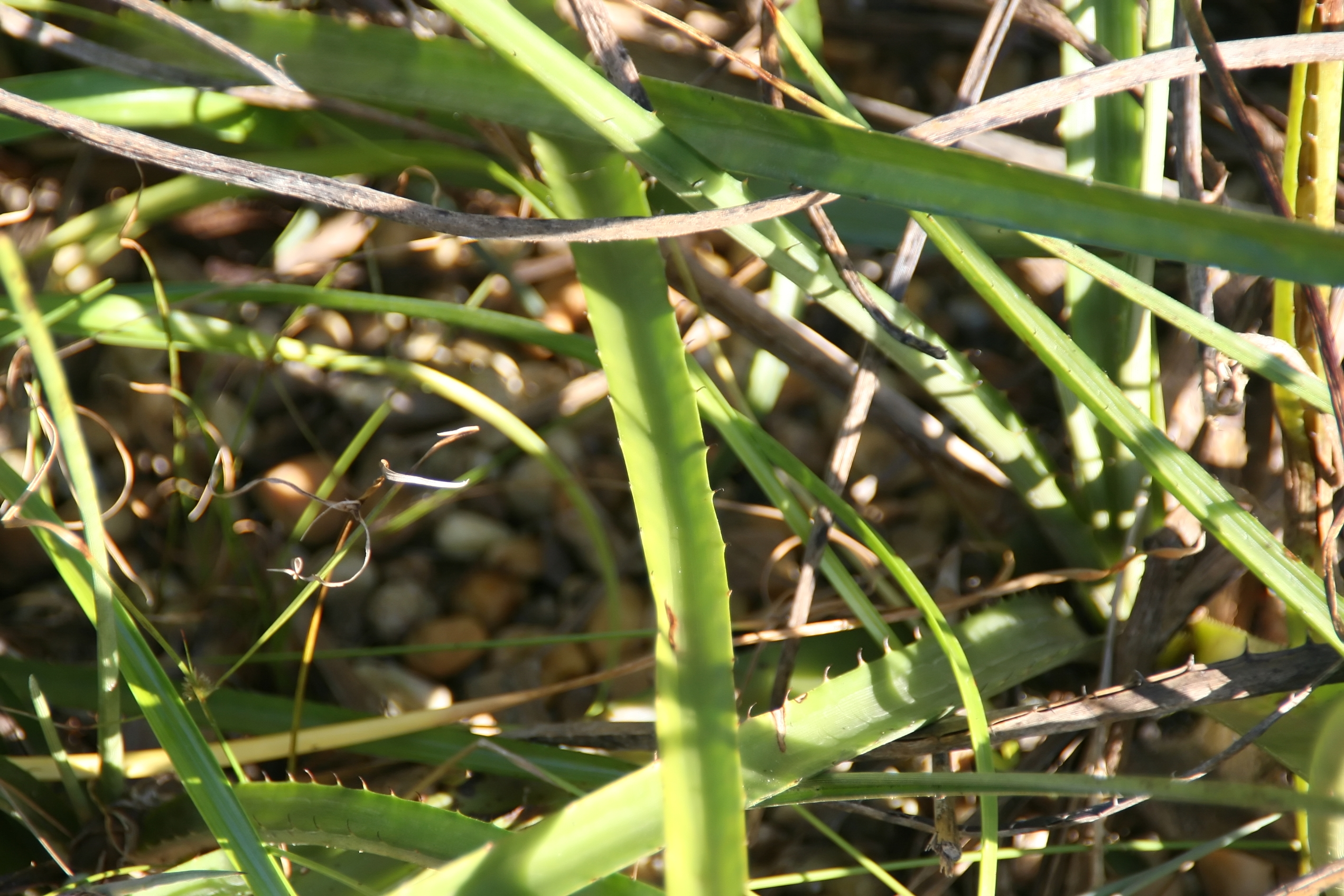

Scientific classification
- Kingdom: Plantae
- Clade: Embryophytes
- Clade: Tracheophytes
- Clade: Spermatophytes
- Clade: Angiosperms
- Clade: Monocots
- Clade: Commelinids
- Order: Poales
- Family: Bromeliaceae
- Genus: Dyckia
- Species: D. ferox

Binomial name
- Dyckia ferox Mez

Synonyms
- Homotypic Synonyms: Dyckia ferox f. australis Hassl.; Dyckia ferox f. vulgaris Hassl.; Heterotypic Synonyms: Dyckia ferox f. hamosa (Mez) A.Cast.; Dyckia ferox subsp. hamosa (Mez) Hassl.; Dyckia hamosa Mez; Dyckia meziana Kuntze

= Dyckia ferox =

Species of flowering plant

Dyckia ferox is a species of flowering plant in the family Bromeliaceae. This species is native to Mato Grosso, Argentina, Bolivia, and Paraguay.
