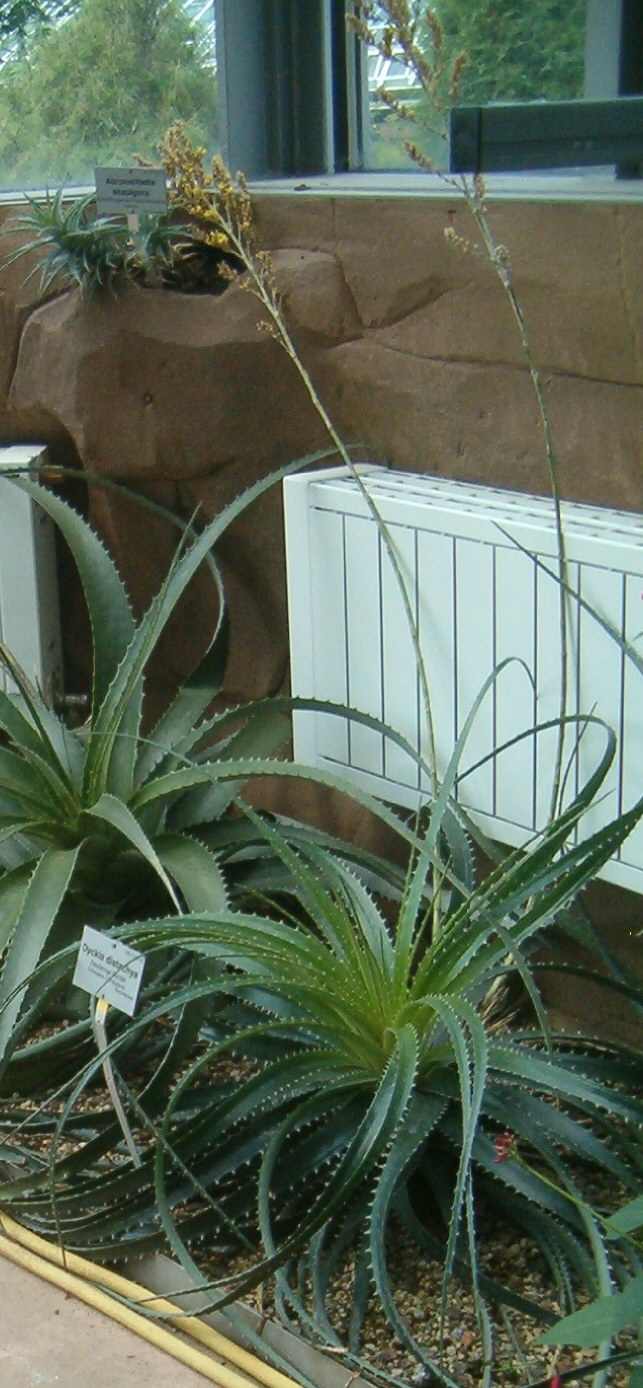

Scientific classification
- Kingdom: Plantae
- Clade: Tracheophytes
- Clade: Angiosperms
- Clade: Monocots
- Clade: Commelinids
- Order: Poales
- Family: Bromeliaceae
- Genus: Dyckia
- Species: D. distachya

Binomial name
- Dyckia distachya Hassler

Synonyms
- Dyckia interrupta Mez

= Dyckia distachya =

Species of flowering plant

Dyckia distachya is a plant species in the genus Dyckia. This species is native to Paraguay and Brazil.
