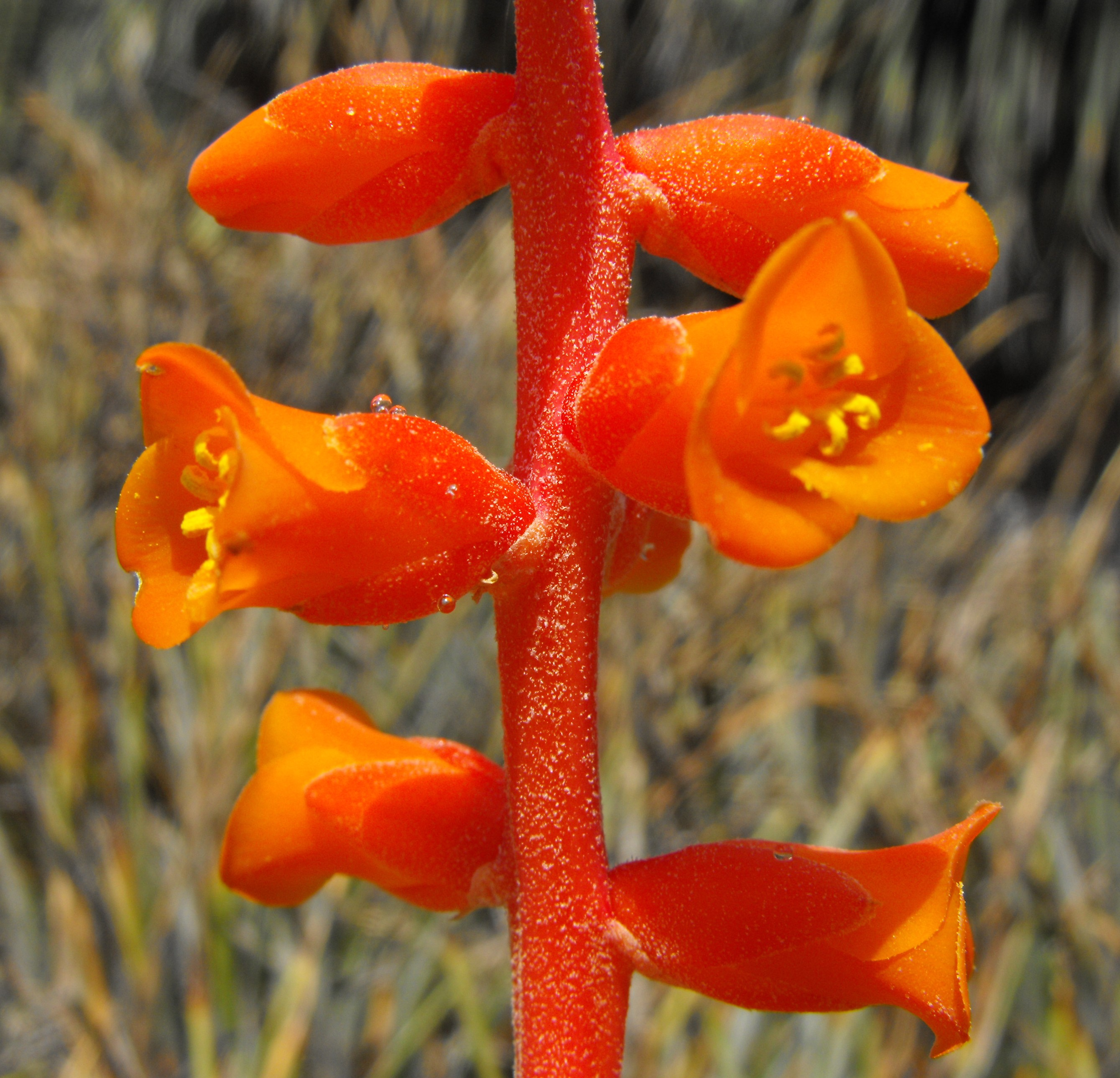
- Dyckia tuberosa var. tuberosa at the Huntington Library & Botanical Gardens in California

Scientific classification
- Kingdom: Plantae
- Clade: Tracheophytes
- Clade: Angiosperms
- Clade: Monocots
- Clade: Commelinids
- Order: Poales
- Family: Bromeliaceae
- Genus: Dyckia
- Species: D. tuberosa

Binomial name
- Dyckia tuberosa (Vellozo) Beer

= Dyckia tuberosa =

Species of flowering plant

Dyckia tuberosa is a plant species in the genus Dyckia. This species is native to Brazil.
