= Dyckia mezii =

Scientific classification
- Kingdom: Plantae
- Clade: Tracheophytes
- Clade: Angiosperms
- Clade: Monocots
- Clade: Commelinids
- Order: Poales
- Family: Bromeliaceae
- Genus: Dyckia
- Species: D. mezii

Binomial name
- Dyckia mezii Krapp, 2013

Synonyms
- Dyckia argentea Mez

Species of flowering plant

Dyckia mezii is a species of stiff-leaved thorny plant in the genus Dyckia. This species is native to Brazil. Dyckia argentea is an illegitimate name for the same species.
