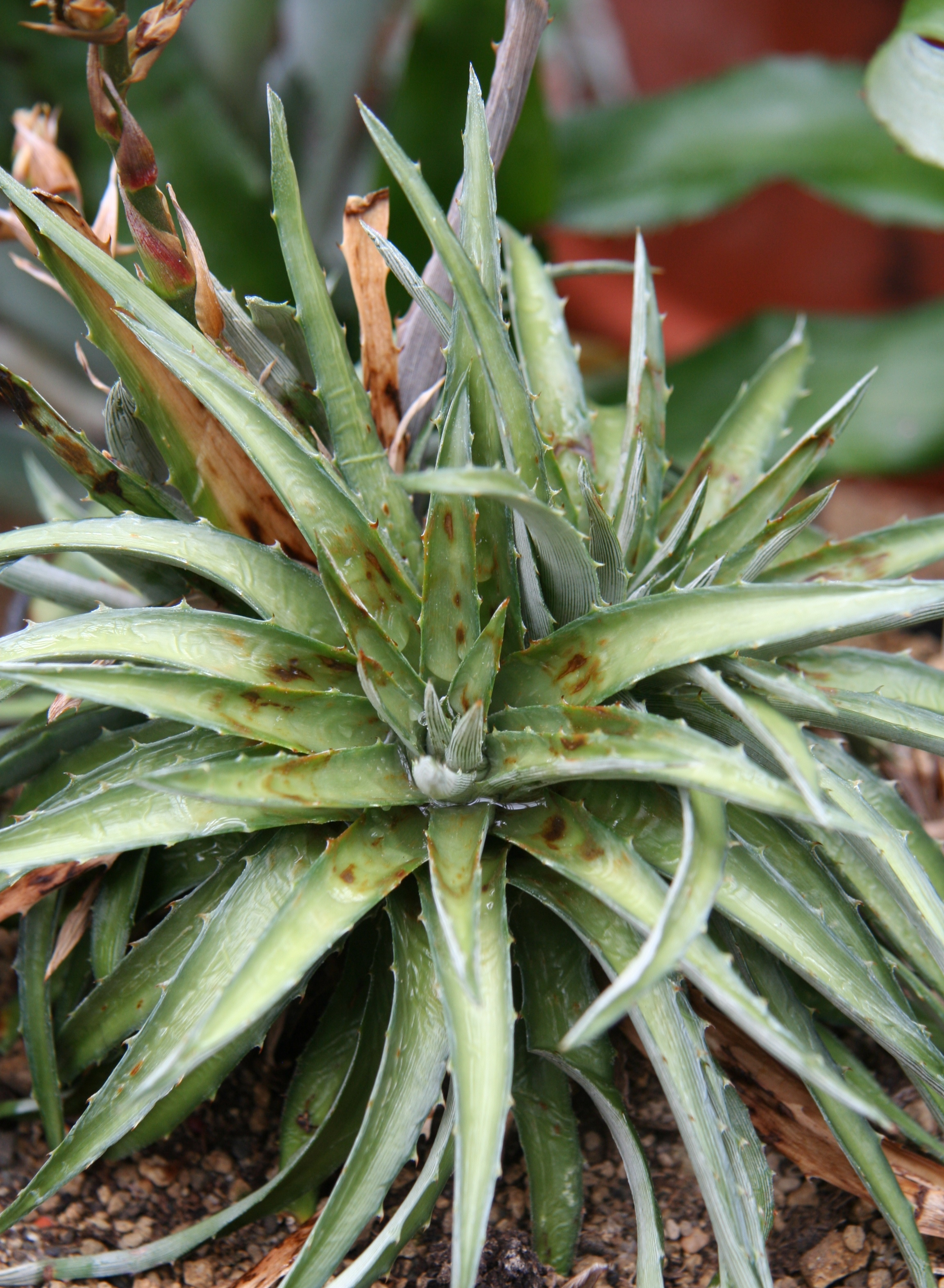

Scientific classification
- Kingdom: Plantae
- Clade: Tracheophytes
- Clade: Angiosperms
- Clade: Monocots
- Clade: Commelinids
- Order: Poales
- Family: Bromeliaceae
- Genus: Dyckia
- Species: D. reitzii

Binomial name
- Dyckia reitzii L.B.Sm.

= Dyckia reitzii =

Species of flowering plant

Dyckia reitzii is a plant species in the genus Dyckia. This species is endemic to Brazil.
