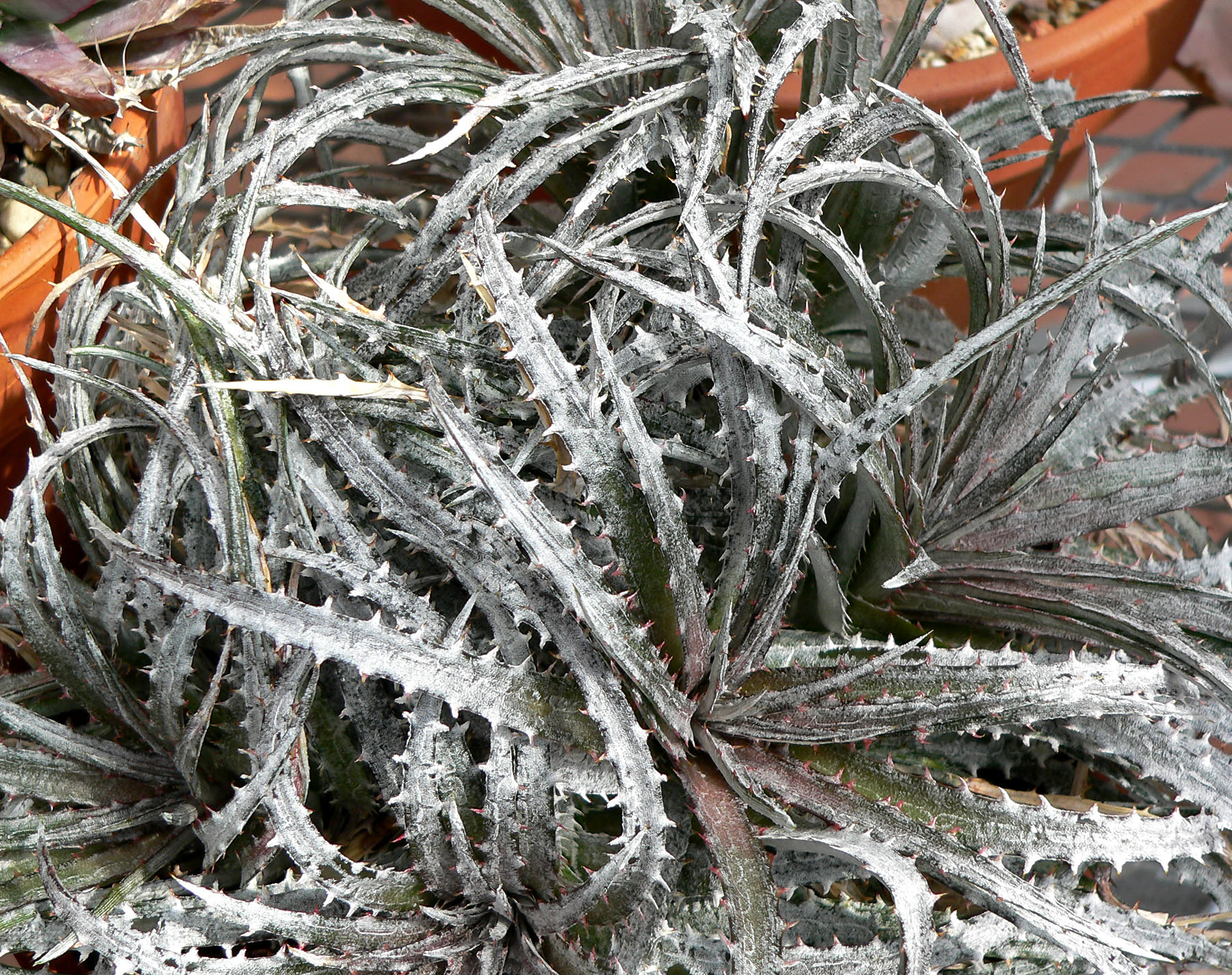

Scientific classification
- Kingdom: Plantae
- Clade: Tracheophytes
- Clade: Angiosperms
- Clade: Monocots
- Clade: Commelinids
- Order: Poales
- Family: Bromeliaceae
- Genus: Dyckia
- Species: D. fosteriana

Binomial name
- Dyckia fosteriana L.B.Sm.

= Dyckia fosteriana =

Species of flowering plant

Flowering specimen

Dyckia fosteriana is a plant species in the genus Dyckia. This species is native to Brazil.

== Cultivars ==
- Dyckia 'Bronze'
- Dyckia 'D. Barry'
- Dyckia 'Gypsy'
- Dyckia 'James Gray'
- Dyckia 'James Green'
- Dyckia 'Pearly Gates'
- Dyckia 'Silver King'
- Dyckia 'Silver Queen'
- Dyckia 'Vista'
