= Dyckia saxatilis =

Conservation status
- Least Concern (IUCN 3.1)

Scientific classification
- Kingdom: Plantae
- Clade: Embryophytes
- Clade: Tracheophytes
- Clade: Spermatophytes
- Clade: Angiosperms
- Clade: Monocots
- Clade: Commelinids
- Order: Poales
- Family: Bromeliaceae
- Genus: Dyckia
- Species: D. saxatilis

Binomial name
- Dyckia saxatilis Mez

Synonyms
- Heterotypic Synonyms: Dyckia hilaireana Mez; Dyckia oligantha var. cristallina Rauh

Species of flowering plant

Dyckia saxatilis is a species of flowering plant in the family Bromeliaceae. This species is native to Brazil.
