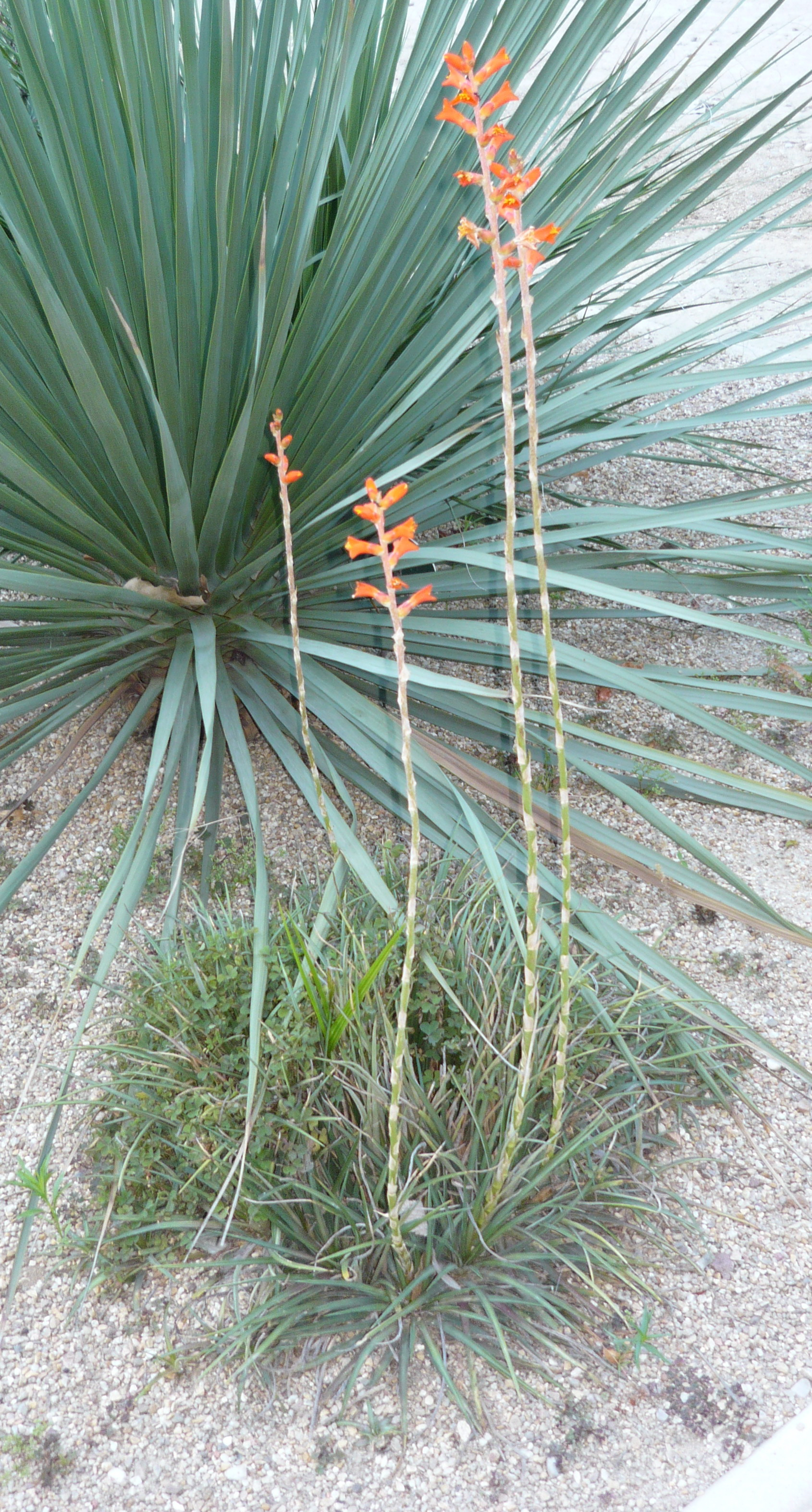

Scientific classification
- Kingdom: Plantae
- Clade: Tracheophytes
- Clade: Angiosperms
- Clade: Monocots
- Clade: Commelinids
- Order: Poales
- Family: Bromeliaceae
- Genus: Dyckia
- Species: D. remotiflora

Binomial name
- Dyckia remotiflora Otto & Dietrich

Synonyms
- Dyckia montevidensis K.Koch; Dyckia vaginosa Mez

= Dyckia remotiflora =

Species of flowering plant

Dyckia remotiflora is a plant species in the genus Dyckia. It is native to Argentina, Uruguay, and Brazil.

Four varieties are recognized:

1. Dyckia remotiflora var. angustior L.B.Sm. - Rio Grande do Sul
2. Dyckia remotiflora var. montevidensis (K.Koch) L.B.Sm. - Entre Ríos, southern Brazil
3. Dyckia remotiflora var. remotiflora - Uruguay, southern Brazil
4. Dyckia remotiflora var. tandilensis (Speg.) Cabrera - Buenos Aires but probably extinct

== Cultivars ==
- Dyckia 'Suntan'
