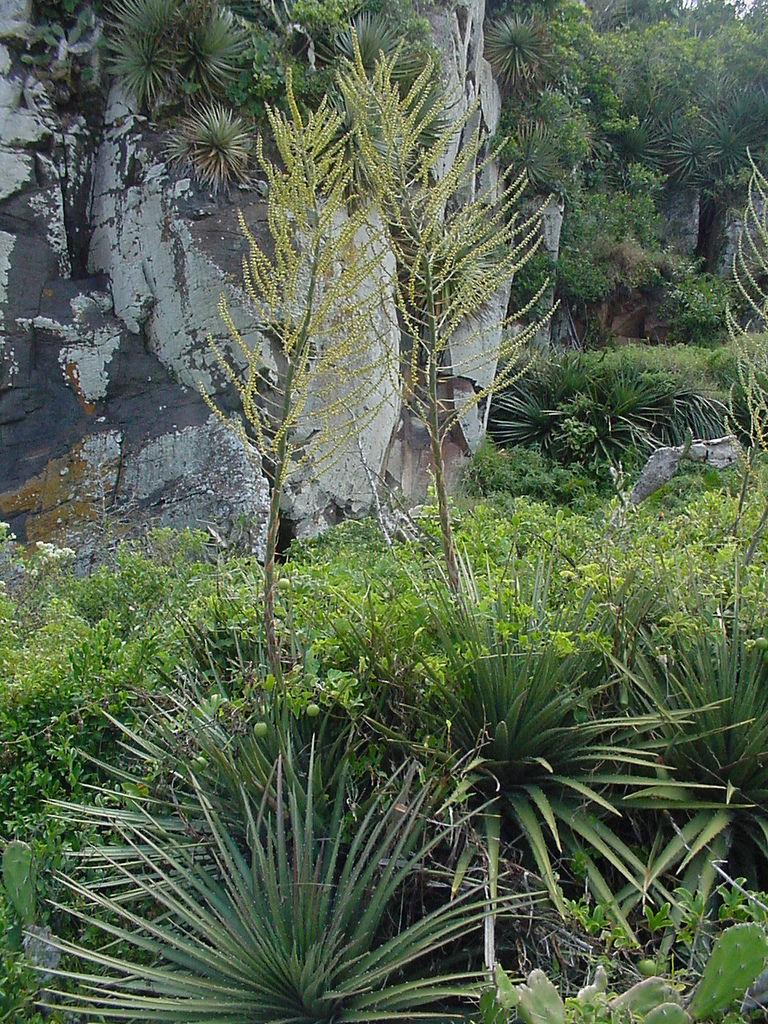

Scientific classification
- Kingdom: Plantae
- Clade: Tracheophytes
- Clade: Angiosperms
- Clade: Monocots
- Clade: Commelinids
- Order: Poales
- Family: Bromeliaceae
- Genus: Dyckia
- Species: D. maritima

Binomial name
- Dyckia maritima Baker

Synonyms
- Dyckia tomentosa Mez; Prionophyllum maritimum (Baker) Mez

= Dyckia maritima =

Species of flowering plant

Dyckia maritima is a species of flowering plant in the Bromeliaceae family. This species is endemic to Brazil. This is an ornamental bromeliad.
