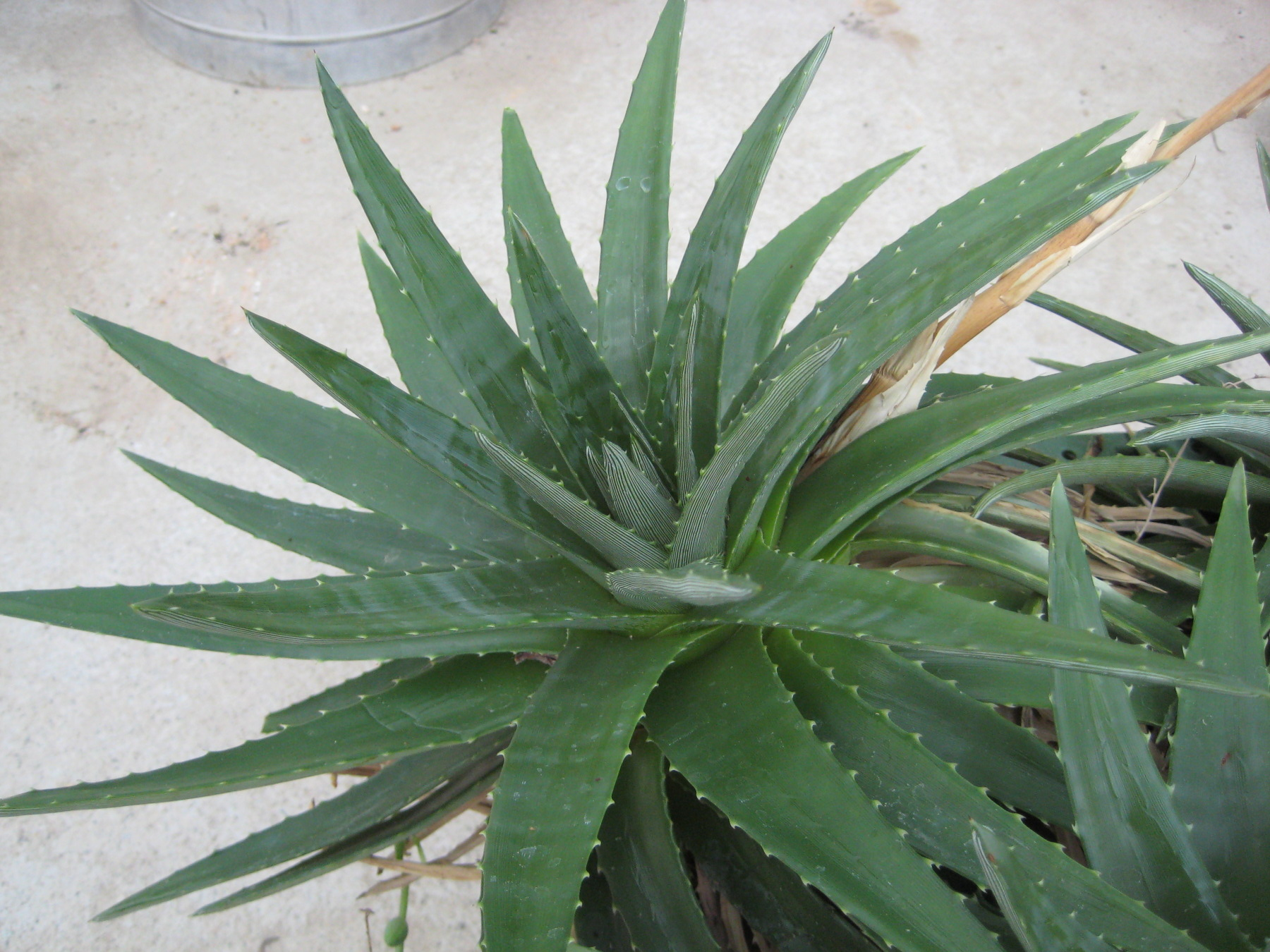

Scientific classification
- Kingdom: Plantae
- Clade: Tracheophytes
- Clade: Angiosperms
- Clade: Monocots
- Clade: Commelinids
- Order: Poales
- Family: Bromeliaceae
- Genus: Dyckia
- Species: D. brevifolia

Binomial name
- Dyckia brevifolia Baker

Synonyms
- Dyckia sulphurea K.Koch

= Dyckia brevifolia =

Species of flowering plant

Dyckia brevifolia, or sawblade, is a species of flowering plant in the Bromeliaceae family. This species is endemic to Brazil.

== Cultivars ==
Dyckia 'Yellow Glow' is a cultivar of Dyckia brevifolia. Dyckia brevifolia is also one parent of the hybrid cultivars Dyckia 'Lad Cutak', Dyckia 'Naked Lady' and Dyckia 'Vista'.
