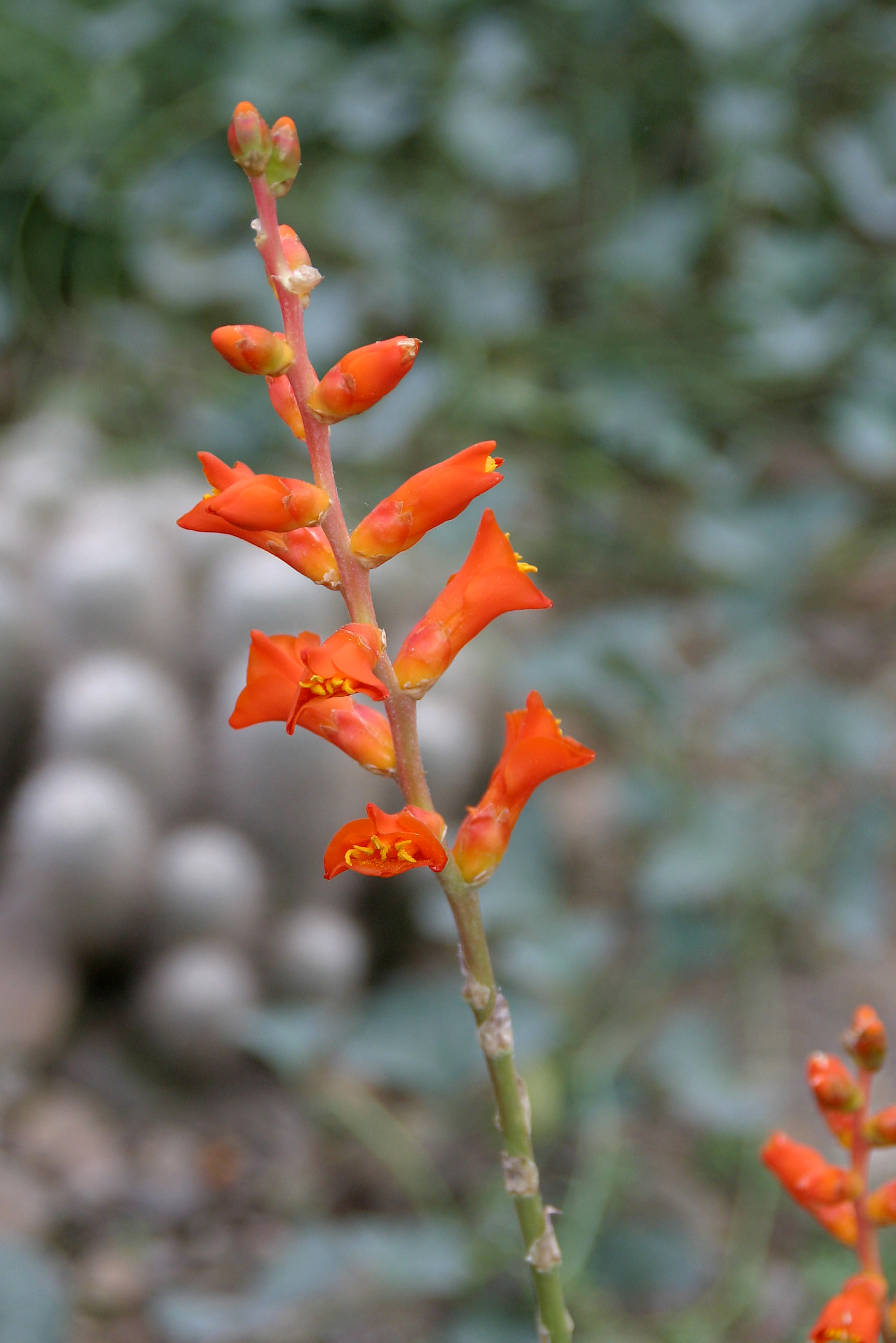

Scientific classification
- Kingdom: Plantae
- Clade: Tracheophytes
- Clade: Angiosperms
- Clade: Monocots
- Clade: Commelinids
- Order: Poales
- Family: Bromeliaceae
- Genus: Dyckia
- Species: D. rariflora

Binomial name
- Dyckia rariflora Schultes f.

= Dyckia rariflora =

Species of flowering plant

Dyckia rariflora is a plant species in the genus Dyckia endemic to the State of Minas Gerais in Brazil.

== Cultivars ==
- Dyckia 'Yakuza'
