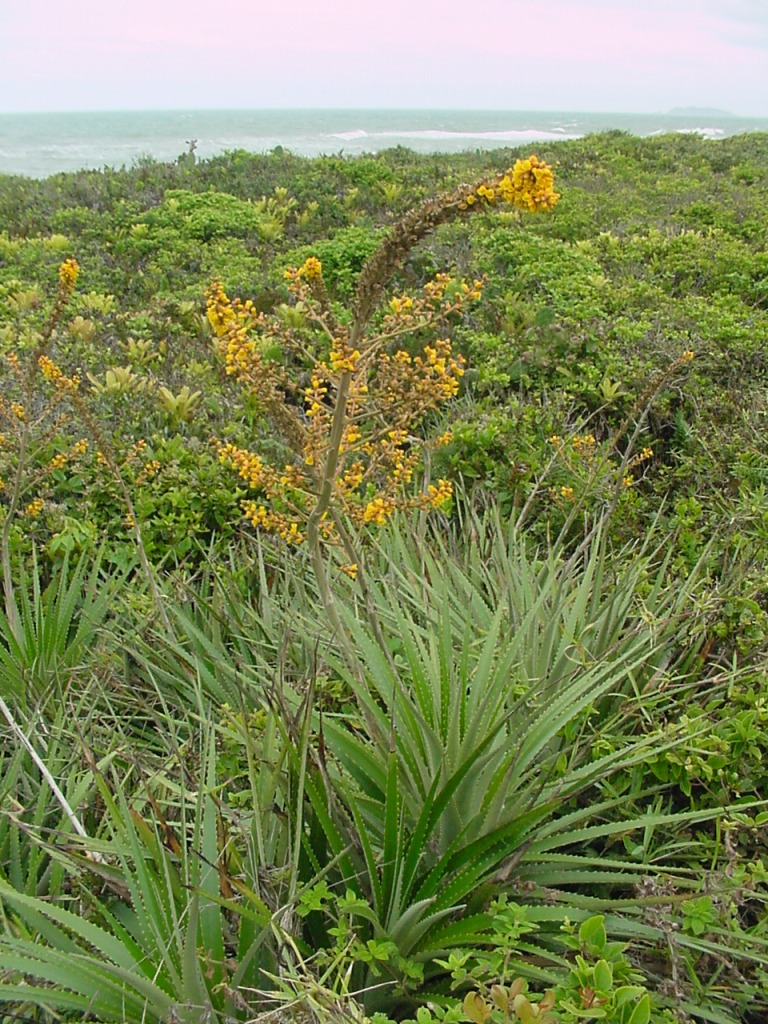

Scientific classification
- Kingdom: Plantae
- Clade: Tracheophytes
- Clade: Angiosperms
- Clade: Monocots
- Clade: Commelinids
- Order: Poales
- Family: Bromeliaceae
- Genus: Dyckia
- Species: D. encholirioides

Binomial name
- Dyckia encholirioides (Gaudichaud) Mez

= Dyckia encholirioides =

Species of flowering plant

Dyckia encholirioides is a plant species in the genus Dyckia. This species is endemic to Brazil.

== Cultivars ==
- Dyckia 'Naked Lady'
