= Dyckia hatschbachii =

Scientific classification
- Kingdom: Plantae
- Clade: Tracheophytes
- Clade: Angiosperms
- Clade: Monocots
- Clade: Commelinids
- Order: Poales
- Family: Bromeliaceae
- Genus: Dyckia
- Species: D. hatschbachii

Binomial name
- Dyckia hatschbachii L.B.Sm

Species of flowering plant

Dyckia hatschbachii is a plant species in the genus Dyckia. This species is endemic to Brazil.
