= Dyckia delicata =

Scientific classification
- Kingdom: Plantae
- Clade: Tracheophytes
- Clade: Angiosperms
- Clade: Monocots
- Clade: Commelinids
- Order: Poales
- Family: Bromeliaceae
- Genus: Dyckia
- Species: D. delicata

Binomial name
- Dyckia delicata Larocca & Sobral

Species of flowering plant

Dyckia delicata is a plant species in the genus Dyckia. This species is native to Brazil.
