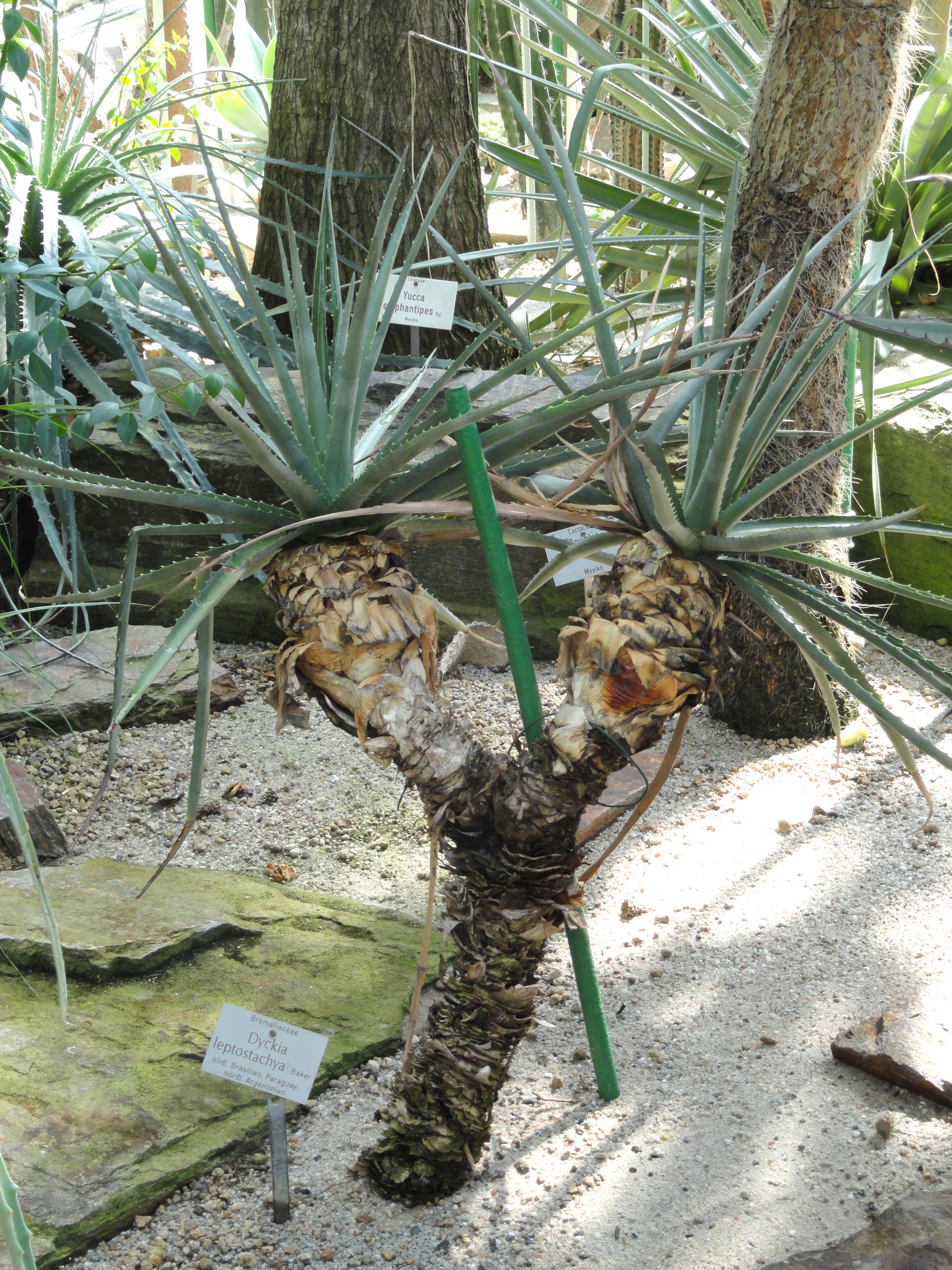

Scientific classification
- Kingdom: Plantae
- Clade: Tracheophytes
- Clade: Angiosperms
- Clade: Monocots
- Clade: Commelinids
- Order: Poales
- Family: Bromeliaceae
- Genus: Dyckia
- Species: D. leptostachya

Binomial name
- Dyckia leptostachya Baker

Synonyms
- Dyckia boliviensis Mez; Dyckia conspicua Mez; Dyckia hassleri Mez; Dyckia apensis Mez; Dyckia longifolia Mez; Dyckia rojasii Mez

= Dyckia leptostachya =

Species of flowering plant

Dyckia leptostachya is a plant species in the genus Dyckia. This species is native to Brazil, Bolivia, Paraguay, and Argentina.

== Cultivars ==
- Dyckia 'Lad Cutak'
- Dyckia 'Red Devil'
