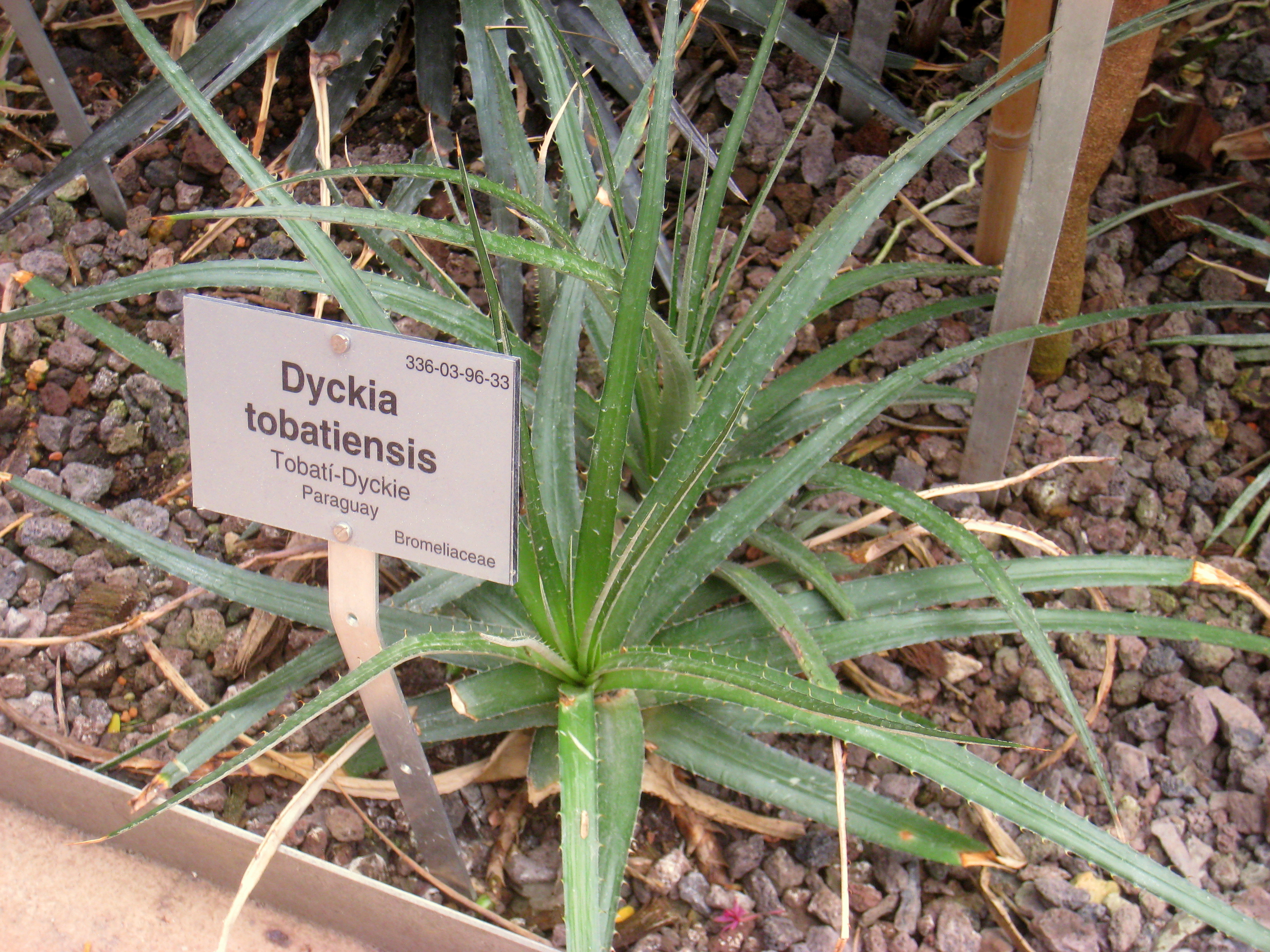

Scientific classification
- Kingdom: Plantae
- Clade: Tracheophytes
- Clade: Angiosperms
- Clade: Monocots
- Clade: Commelinids
- Order: Poales
- Family: Bromeliaceae
- Genus: Dyckia
- Species: D. tobatiensis

Binomial name
- Dyckia tobatiensis Hassler

= Dyckia tobatiensis =

Species of flowering plant

Dyckia tobatiensis is a plant species of the family Bromeliaceae. It is native to Paraguay.
