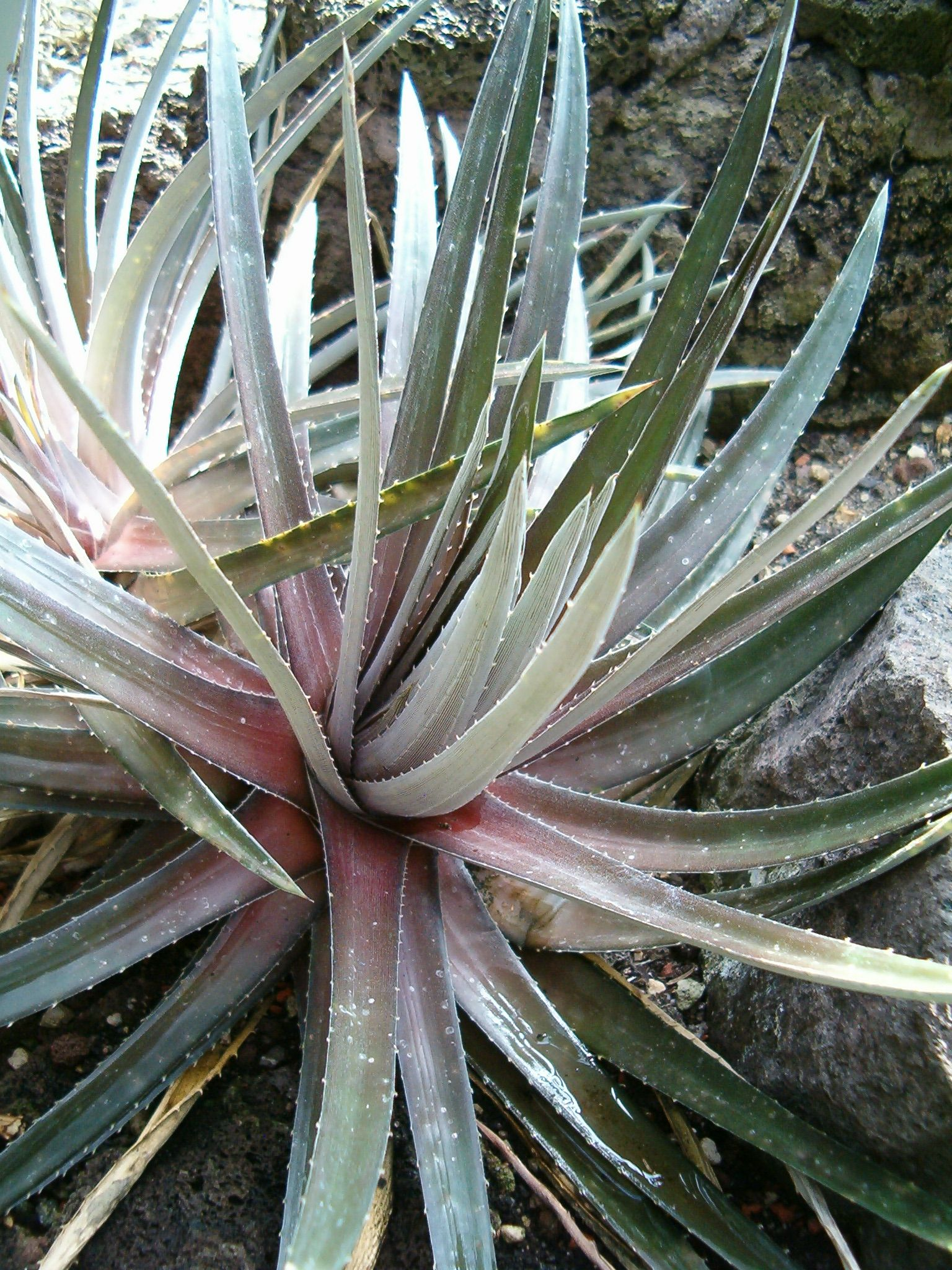
- Dyckia maracasensis

Scientific classification
- Kingdom: Plantae
- Clade: Tracheophytes
- Clade: Angiosperms
- Clade: Monocots
- Clade: Commelinids
- Order: Poales
- Family: Bromeliaceae
- Subfamily: Pitcairnioideae
- Genus: Dyckia; Schult.f.

Synonyms
- Garrelia Gaudich.; Prionophyllum K.Koch

= Dyckia =

Genus of flowering plants

Dyckia is a genus of plants in the family Bromeliaceae, subfamily Pitcairnioideae.

The genus is named after the Prussian botanist, botanical artist and horticulturist The Prince and Earl of Salm Reifferscheid-Dyck (1773–1861).

Dyckias, with stiff and thorny leaves, prefer rocky and/or sunny areas and have a natural tendency to clump leading to thick, large mats.

The subfamily Pitcairnioideae contains several "terrestrial" members of the Bromeliaceae, with cultivated genera including Dyckia, Hechtia, Pitcairnia and Puya. They are native to arid and high-altitude regions of Brazil and the central part of South America.

== Species ==
- Dyckia acutiflora Leme & Z.J.G.Miranda - Goiás
- Dyckia affinis Baker - Paraguay
- Dyckia agudensis Irgang & Sobral - Rio Grande do Sul
- Dyckia alba Winkler - Rio Grande do Sul
- Dyckia areniticola Leme - Mato Grosso
- Dyckia atratiflora P.J.Braun, Esteves & Scharf - Goiás
- Dyckia aurea L.B. Smith - Goiás
- Dyckia barthlottii R.Vásquez & Ibisch - Bolivia
- Dyckia beateae E. Gross & Rauh - Mato Grosso
- Dyckia beloisae L.B.Sm. - Minas Gerais
- Dyckia brachyphylla L.B. Smith - Minas Gerais
- Dyckia brachystachya Rauh & E. Gross - Bahia
- Dyckia bracteata (Wittmack) Mez - Minas Gerais, Espírito Santo
- Dyckia brasiliana L.B. Smith - Brasília
- Dyckia braunii Rauh - Goiás
- Dyckia brevifolia Baker - from Paraná to Santa Catarina
- Dyckia burchellii Baker - Bahia, Goiás
- Dyckia burle-marxii L.B. Smith & R.W. Read - Bahia
- Dyckia cabrerae L.B. Smith & Reitz - from Paraná to Santa Catarina
- Dyckia cangaphila P.J.Braun, Esteves & Scharf - Goiás
- Dyckia choristaminea Mez - Rio Grande do Sul
- Dyckia cinerea Mez - Minas Gerais, Espírito Santo
- Dyckia commixta Hassler - Paraguay, Paraná
- Dyckia consimilis Mez - Minas Gerais
- Dyckia coximensis L.B. Smith & Reitz - Mato Grosso
- Dyckia crassifolia Rauh - Bolivia
- Dyckia crocea L.B. Smith - Paraná
- Dyckia dawsonii L.B. Smith - Goiás
- Dyckia delicata Larocca & Sobral - Rio Grande do Sul
- Dyckia deltoidea (L.B. Smith) L.B. Smith - Paraná
- Dyckia densiflora Schultes f. - Minas Gerais
- Dyckia dissitiflora Schultes f. - Piauí, Minas Gerais
- Dyckia distachya Hassler - Paraguay, Brazil
- Dyckia domfelicianensis T. Strehl - Rio Grande do Sul
- Dyckia duckei L.B. Smith - Pará, Maranhão
- Dyckia dusenii L.B. Smith - Paraná, Santa Catarina
- Dyckia edwardii P.J.Braun, Esteves & Scharf - Goiás
- Dyckia elata Mez - Minas Gerais
- Dyckia elisabethae Winkler - Rio Grande do Sul
- Dyckia elongata Mez - Bahia
- Dyckia eminens Mez - Goiás
- Dyckia encholirioides (Gaudichaud) Mez - São Paulo, Santa Catarina
- Dyckia espiritosantensis Leme & A.P.Fontana - Espírito Santo
- Dyckia estevesii Rauh - Mato Grosso
- Dyckia excelsa Leme - Mato Grosso
- Dyckia exserta L.B. Smith - Brazil, Paraguay
- Dyckia ferox Mez - Mato Grosso, Argentina, Bolivia, Paraguay
- Dyckia ferruginea Mez - Mato Grosso
- Dyckia floribunda Grisebach - Argentina
- Dyckia formosensis Leme & Z.J.G.Miranda - Goiás
- Dyckia fosteriana L.B. Smith - Paraná
- Dyckia frigida Hooker f. - Paraná
- Dyckia glabrifolia Leme & O.B.C.Ribeiro - Minas Gerais
- Dyckia glandulosa L.B. Smith & Reitz - Minas Gerais
- Dyckia goehringii E. Gross & Rauh - Minas Gerais
- Dyckia goiana L.B. Smith - Goiás
- Dyckia gouveiana Leme & O.B.C.Ribeiro - Minas Gerais
- Dyckia gracilis Mez - Argentina, Bolivia
- Dyckia grandidentata P.J.Braun & Esteves - Mato Grosso do Sul
- Dyckia granmogulensis Rauh - Minas Gerais
- Dyckia hatschbachii L.B. Smith - Paraná
- Dyckia hebdingii L.B. Smith - Rio Grande do Sul
- Dyckia hohenbergioides Leme & E. Esteves - Bahia
- Dyckia horridula Mez - Brazil
- Dyckia ibicuiensis T. Strehl - Rio Grande do Sul
- Dyckia ibiramensis Reitz - Santa Catarina
- Dyckia insignis Hassler - Paraguay
- Dyckia irmgardiae L.B. Smith - Rio Grande do Sul
- Dyckia irwinii L.B. Smith - Mato Grosso
- Dyckia joanae-marcioi P.J.Braun, Esteves & Scharf - Minas Gerais
- Dyckia jonesiana Strehl - Rio Grande do Sul
- Dyckia julianae T. Strehl - Rio Grande do Sul
- Dyckia kranziana Leme - Mato Grosso
- Dyckia lagoensis Mez - Minas Gerais
- Dyckia leptostachya Baker - Bolivia, Paraguay, Brazil, Argentina
- Dyckia limae L.B. Smith - Pernambuco
- Dyckia lindevaldae Rauh - Goiás
- Dyckia linearifolia Baker - Brazil
- Dyckia lunaris Leme - Goiás
- Dyckia lutziana L.B. Smith - São Paulo
- Dyckia macedoi L.B. Smith - Minas Gerais
- Dyckia machrisiana L.B. Smith - Goiás
- Dyckia macropoda L.B. Smith - Minas Gerais
- Dyckia maracasensis Ule - Bahia
- Dyckia maritima Baker - southern Brazil
- Dyckia marnier-lapostollei L.B. Smith - Minas Gerais, Goiás
- Dyckia martinellii B.R. Silva & Forzza - Rio de Janeiro
- Dyckia mauriziae Esteves & Hofacker - Goiás
- Dyckia mello-barretoi L.B. Smith - Minas Gerais
- Dyckia mezii Krapp
- Dyckia microcalyx Baker - Misiones, Mato Grosso do Sul, Paraná, Paraguay
- Dyckia milagrensis Leme - Bahia
- Dyckia minarum Mez - from Goiás to Santa Catarina
- Dyckia mirandana Leme & Z.J.G.Miranda - Goiás
- Dyckia mitis Castellanos - Misiones
- Dyckia montezumensis Leme - Minas Gerais
- Dyckia monticola L.B. Smith & Reitz - Minas Gerais, Santa Catarina
- Dyckia nana Leme & O.B.C.Ribeiro - Minas Gerais
- Dyckia nervata Rauh - Bahia
- Dyckia niederleinii Mez - Misiones
- Dyckia nigrospinulata Strehl - Rio Grande do Sul
- Dyckia odorata L.B. Smith - Goiás
- Dyckia orobanchoides Mez - Minas Gerais
- Dyckia paraensis L.B. Smith - Pará, Mato Grosso
- Dyckia pauciflora L.B. Smith & R.W. Read - Goiás
- Dyckia paucispina Leme & E. Esteves - Mato Grosso do Sul
- Dyckia pectinata L.B. Smith & Reitz - Minas Gerais
- Dyckia pernambucana L.B. Smith - Pernambuco
- Dyckia platyphylla L.B. Smith - Bahia
- Dyckia polycladus L.B. Smith - Rio Grande do Sul
- Dyckia pottiorum Leme - Mato Grosso do Sul
- Dyckia princeps Lemaire - Minas Gerais
- Dyckia pseudococcinea L.B. Smith - Rio de Janeiro
- Dyckia pulquinensis Wittmack - Bolivia (Santa Cruz)
- Dyckia pumila L.B. Smith - Goiás
- Dyckia racemosa Baker - Goiás
- Dyckia racinae L.B. Smith - Rio Grande do Sul
- Dyckia ragonesei Castellanos - Argentina
- Dyckia rariflora Schultes f. - Minas Gerais
- Dyckia reitzii L.B. Smith - southern Brazil
- Dyckia remotiflora Otto & Dietrich - Argentina, Uruguay, Brazil
- Dyckia retardata Winkler - Rio Grande do Sul
- Dyckia retroflexa Winkler - Rio Grande do Sul
- Dyckia richardii P.J.Braun & Esteves - Goiás
- Dyckia rigida T. Strehl - Rio Grande do Sul
- Dyckia rondonopolitana Leme - Mato Grosso
- Dyckia rupestris W. Till & Morawetz - Pernambuco
- Dyckia saxatilis Mez - central Brazil
- Dyckia schwackeana Mez - Minas Gerais
- Dyckia secunda L.B. Smith -Bahia
- Dyckia secundifolia Leme - Mato Grosso
- Dyckia selloa (K. Koch) Baker - southern Brazil
- Dyckia sellowiana Mez - Brasília
- Dyckia sickii L.B. Smith - Pará
- Dyckia silvae L.B. Smith - Pará
- Dyckia simulans L.B. Smith - Minas Gerais
- Dyckia sordida Baker - Minas Gerais
- Dyckia spinulosa L.B. Smith & Reitz - Minas Gerais
- Dyckia stenophylla L.B. Smith - Goiás
- Dyckia stolonifera P.J.Braun & Esteves - Mato Grosso do Sul
- Dyckia subinermis Mez - Misiones
- Dyckia tenebrosa Leme & H. Luther - Minas Gerais
- Dyckia tenuis Mez - Goiás, Mato Grosso
- Dyckia tobatiensis Hassler - Paraguay
- Dyckia tomentella Mez - Paraguay
- Dyckia trichostachya Baker - Minas Gerais, Espírito Santo
- Dyckia tuberosa (Vellozo) Beer - from Bahia to Rio Grande do Sul
- Dyckia tweediei Mez - Salta, Santiago del Estero
- Dyckia uleana Mez - Goiás
- Dyckia ursina L.B. Smith - Minas Gerais
- Dyckia velascana Mez - Argentina
- Dyckia velloziifolia Mez - Paraguay
- Dyckia vestita Hassler - Paraguay
- Dyckia vicentensis Strehl - Rio Grande do Sul
- Dyckia virgata Mez - Paraguay
- Dyckia waechteri Strehl - Rio Grande do Sul
- Dyckia walteriana Leme - Paraná
- Dyckia warmingii Mez - Minas Gerais
- Dyckia weddelliana Baker - Minas Gerais

== Gallery ==
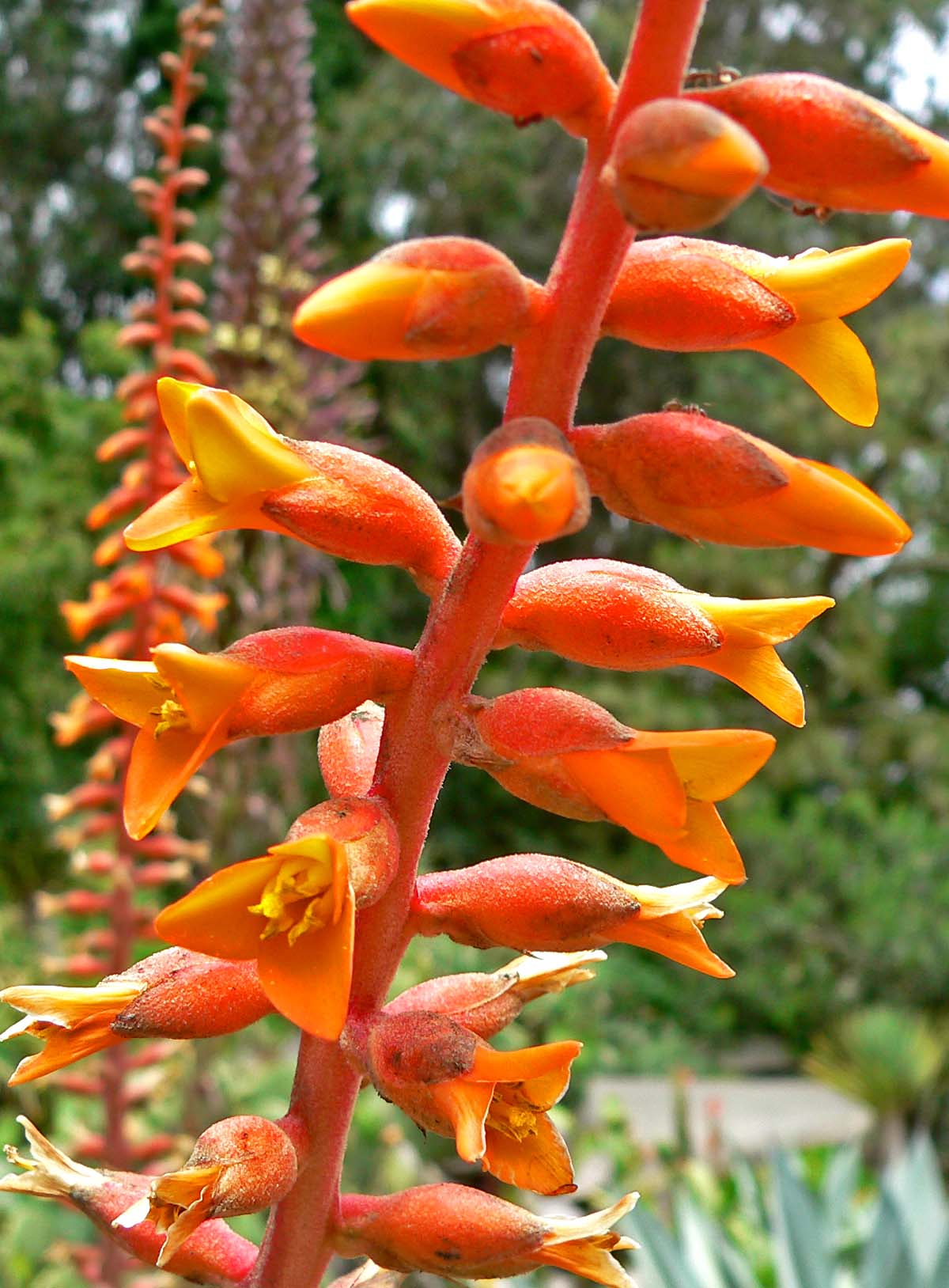
Dyckia platyphylla [inflorescence]

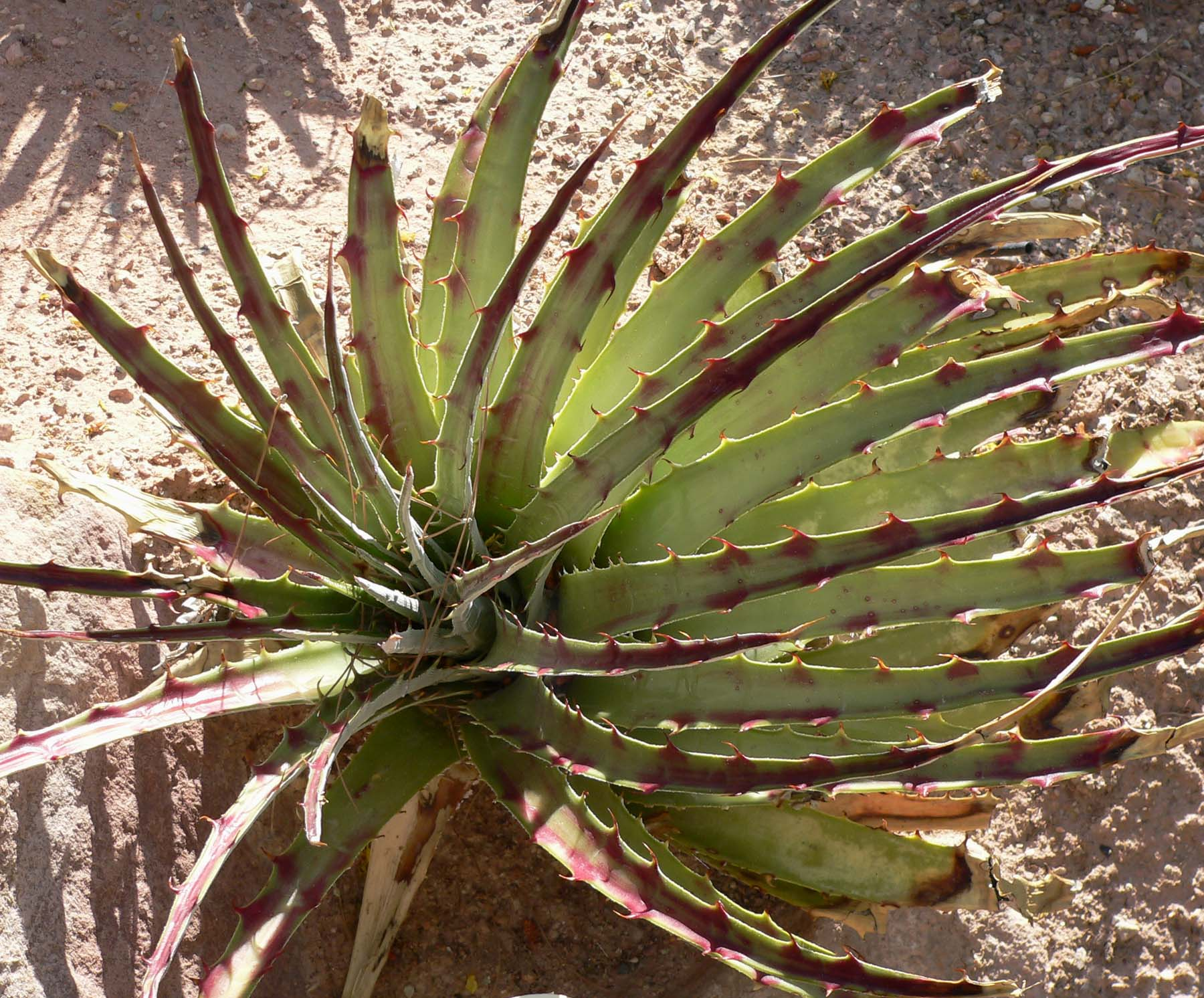
Dyckia remotiflora

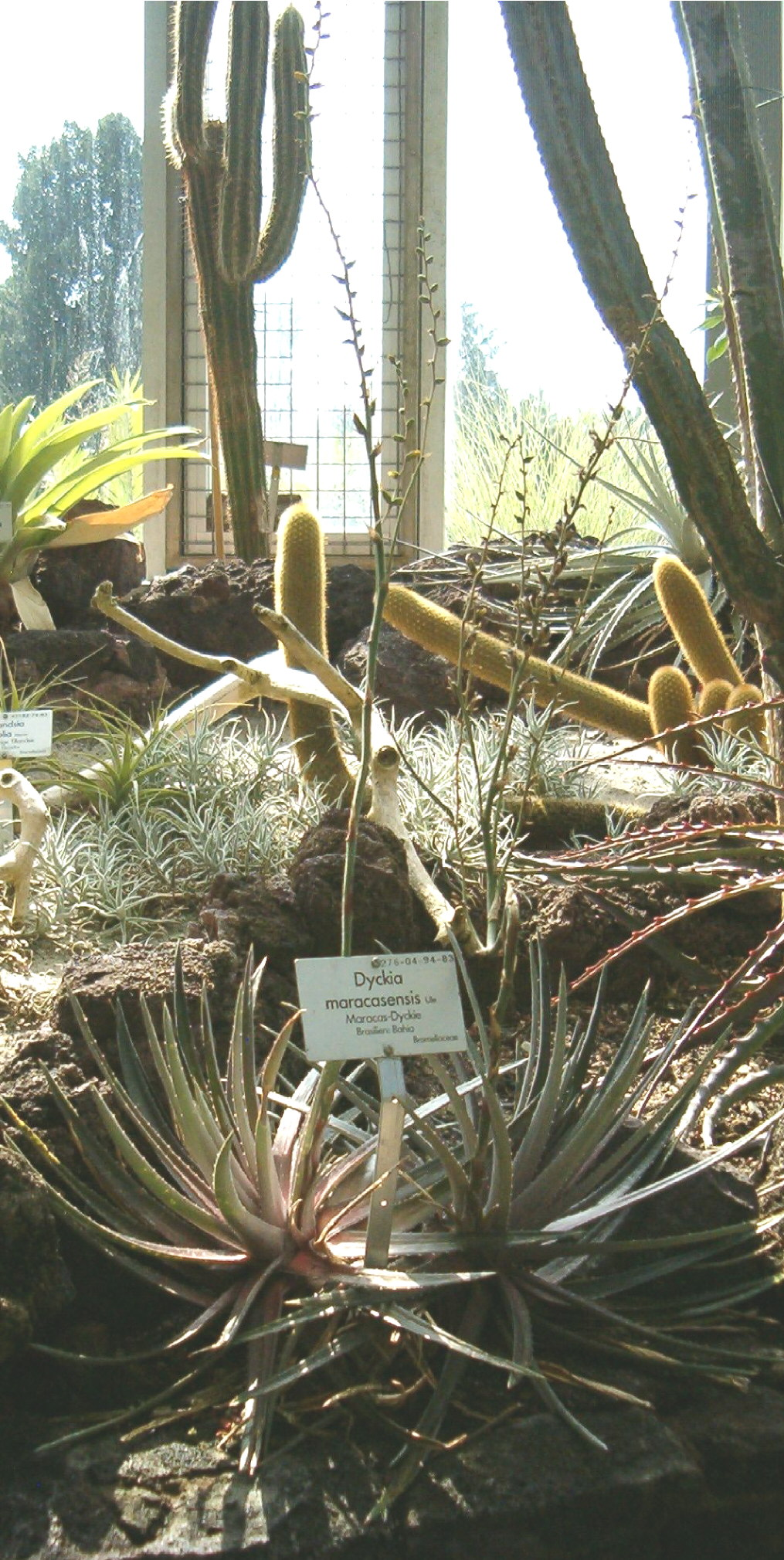
Dyckia maracasensis (in foreground)

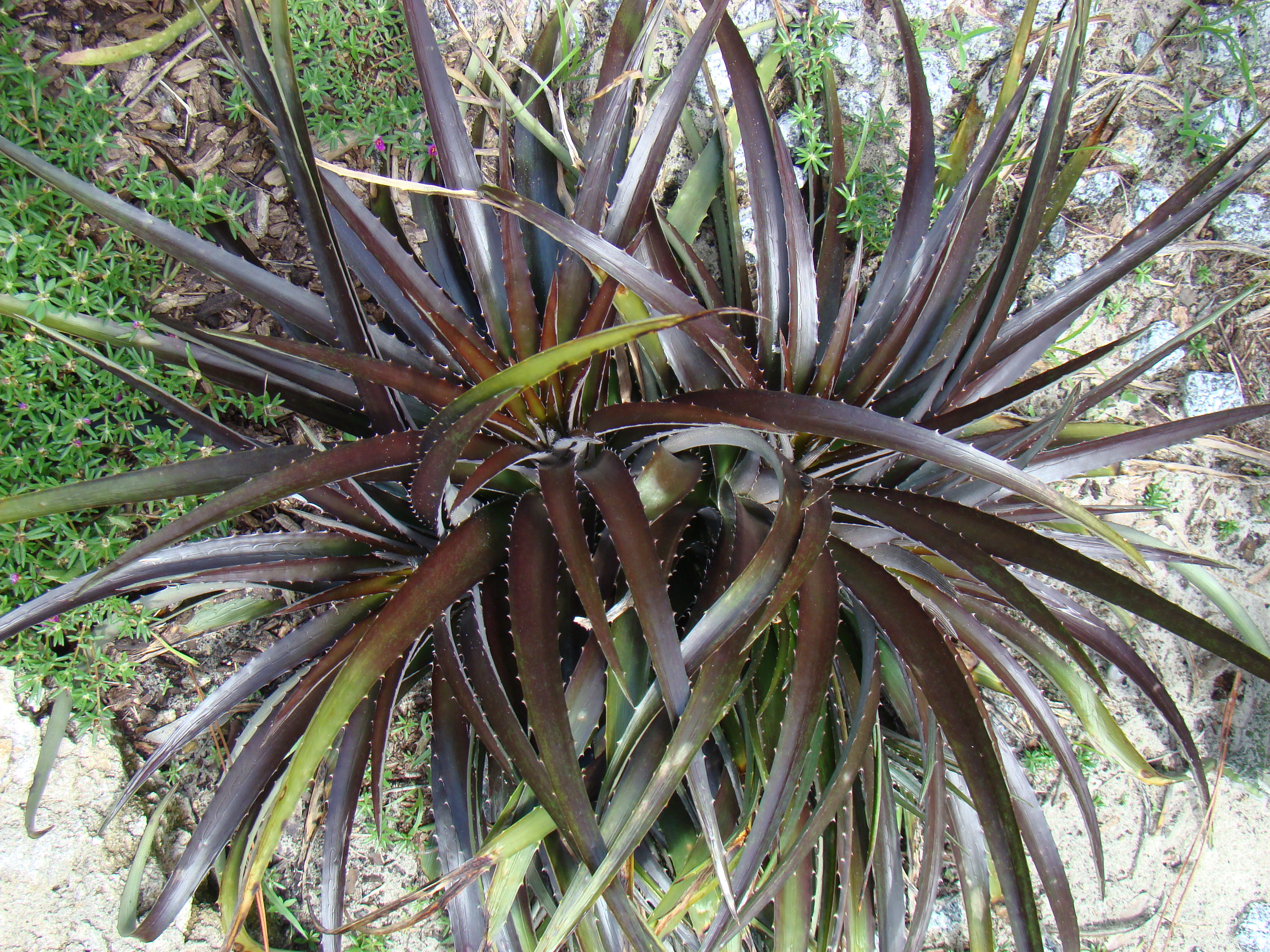
DYCKIA Cherry Coke (1 of 3)

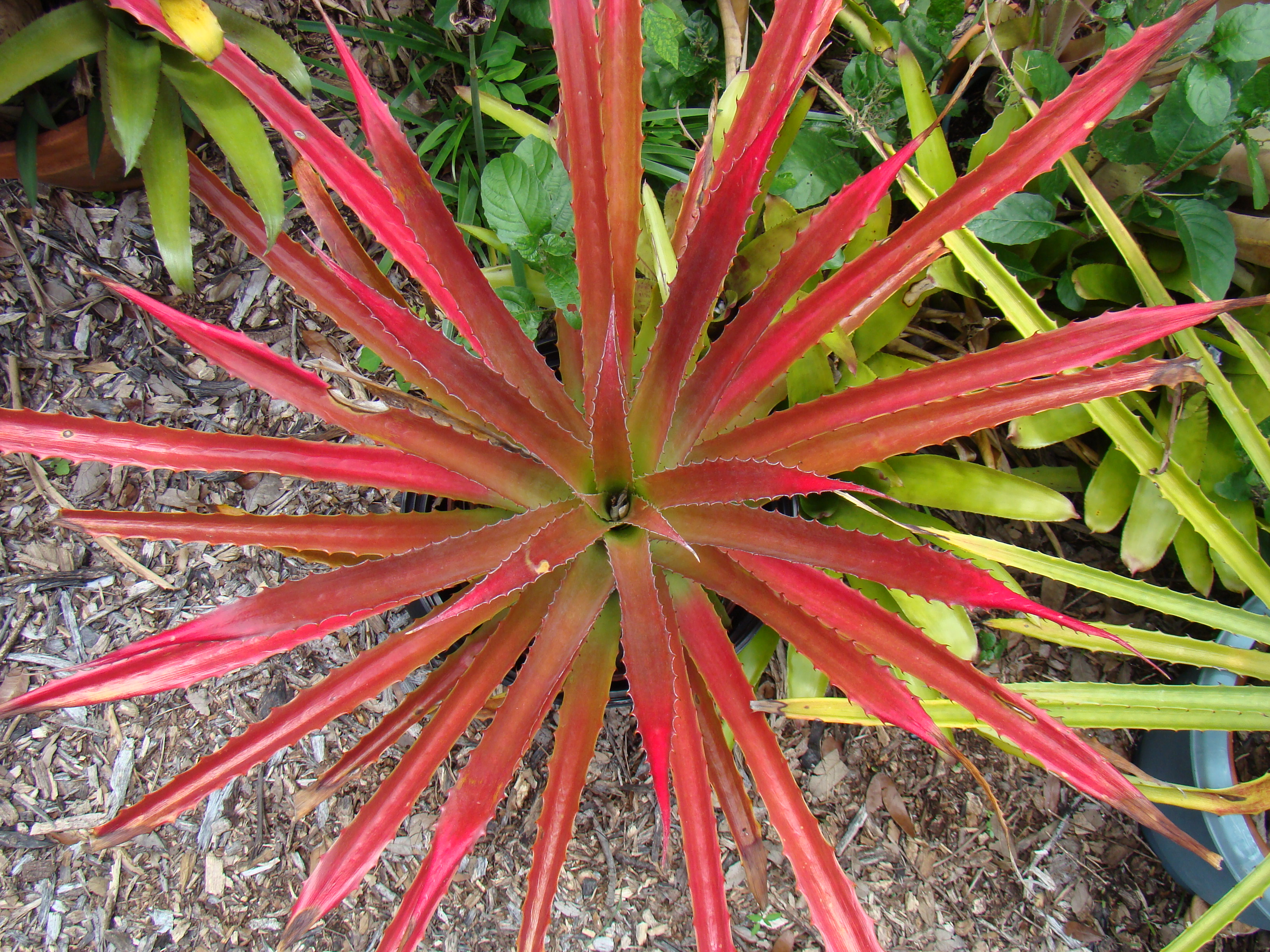
DYCKIA Red (2 of 3)

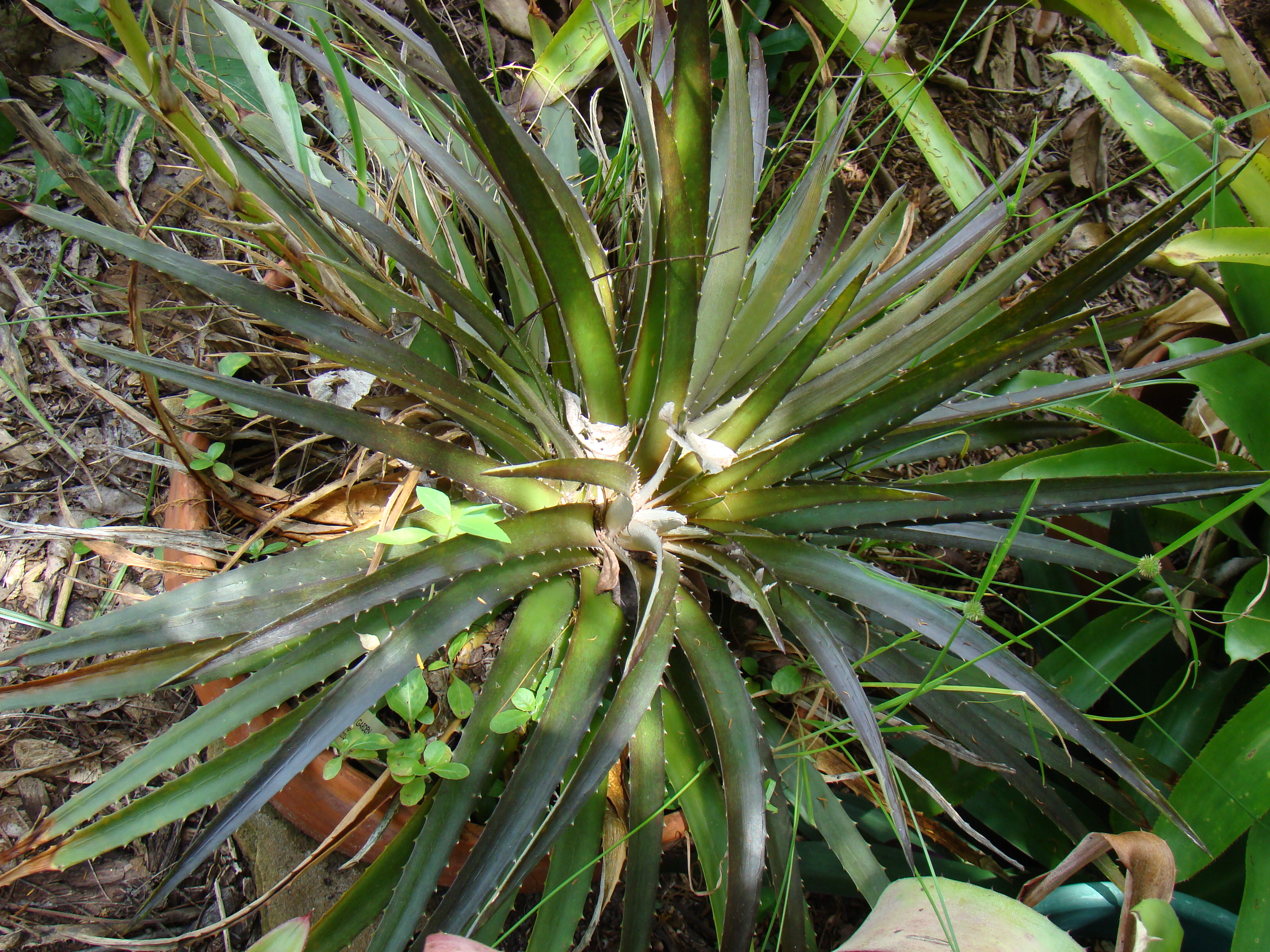
DYCKIA Green (3 of 3)
