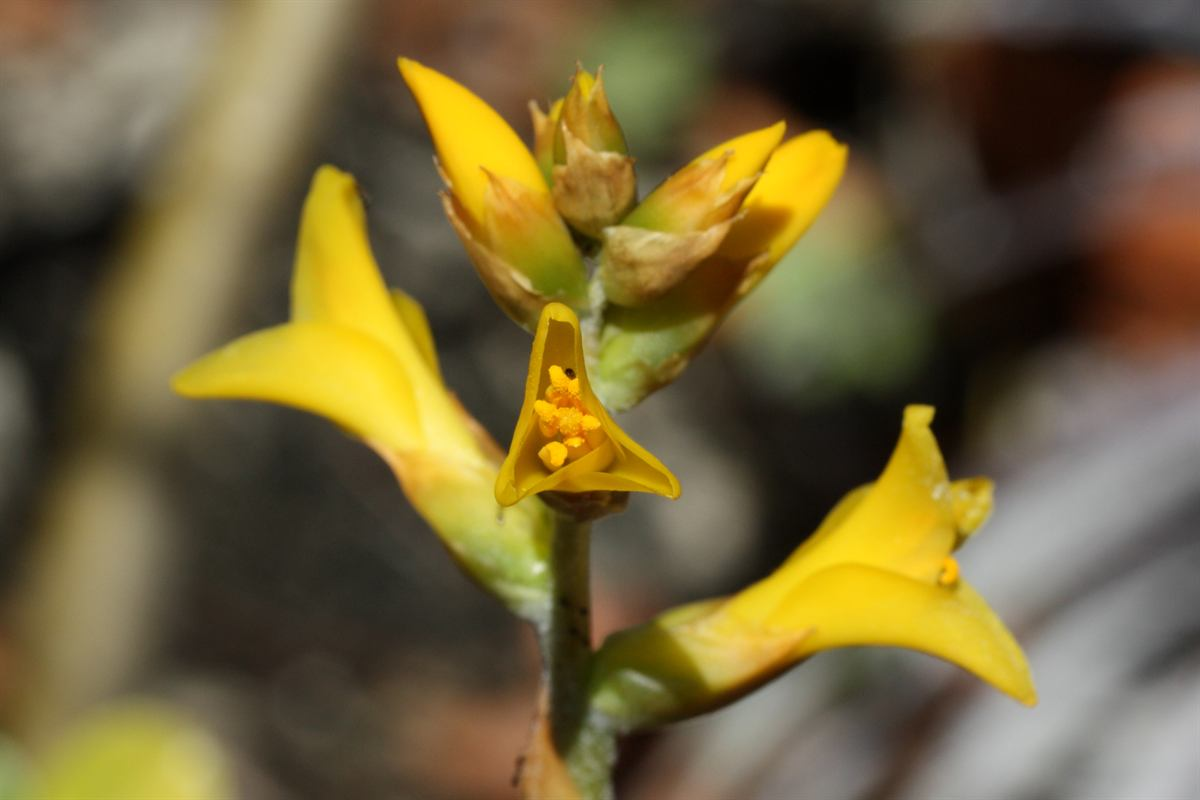

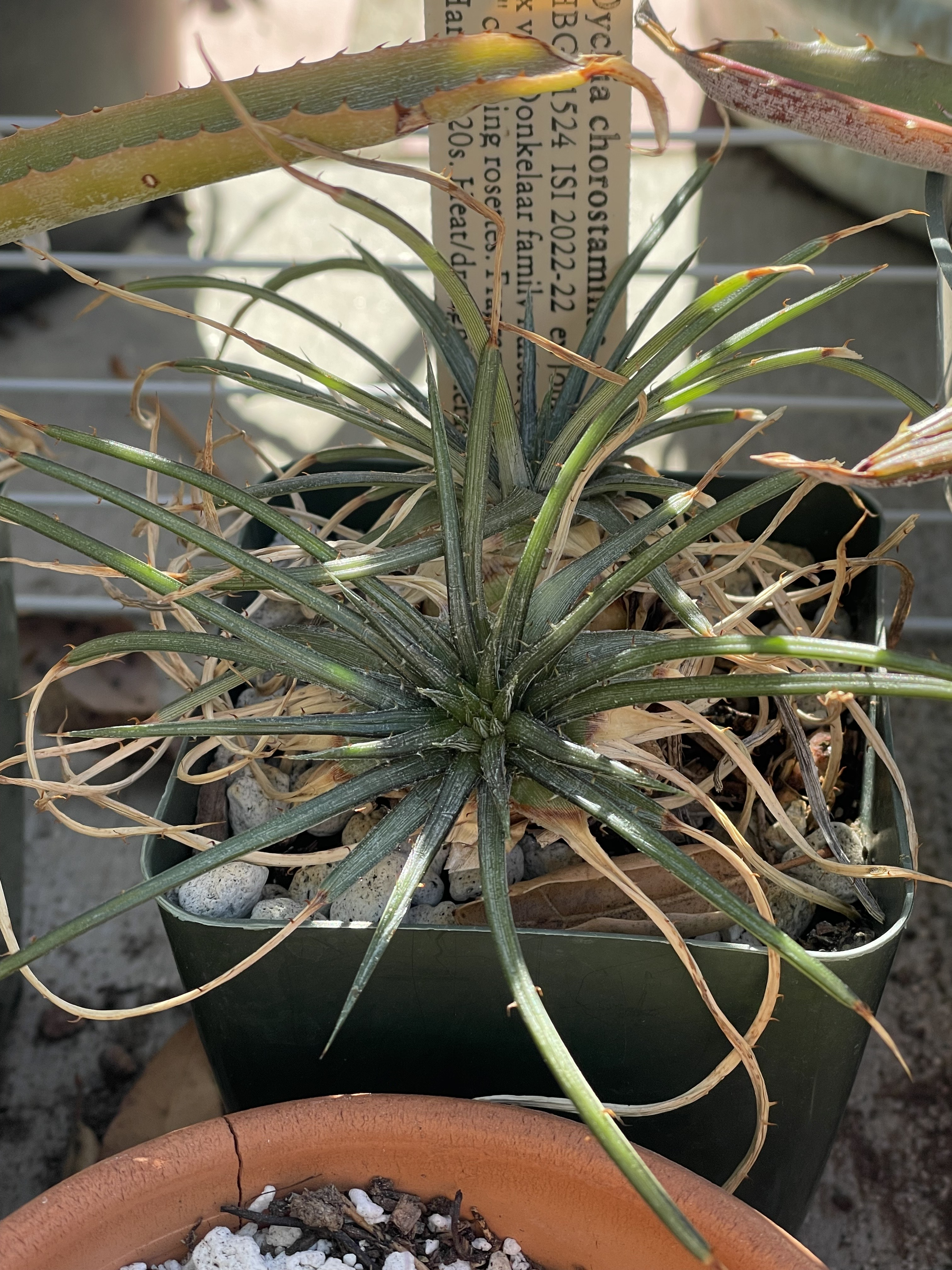

Scientific classification
- Kingdom: Plantae
- Clade: Embryophytes
- Clade: Tracheophytes
- Clade: Spermatophytes
- Clade: Angiosperms
- Clade: Monocots
- Clade: Commelinids
- Order: Poales
- Family: Bromeliaceae
- Genus: Dyckia
- Species: D. choristaminea

Binomial name
- Dyckia choristaminea Mez

= Dyckia choristaminea =

Species of flowering plant

Dyckia choristaminea is a species of flowering plant in the family Bromeliaceae. It belongs to the order Poales. This species is native to Brazil.

== Cultivars ==
- Dyckia 'June'
- Dyckia 'Keith Ryde'
