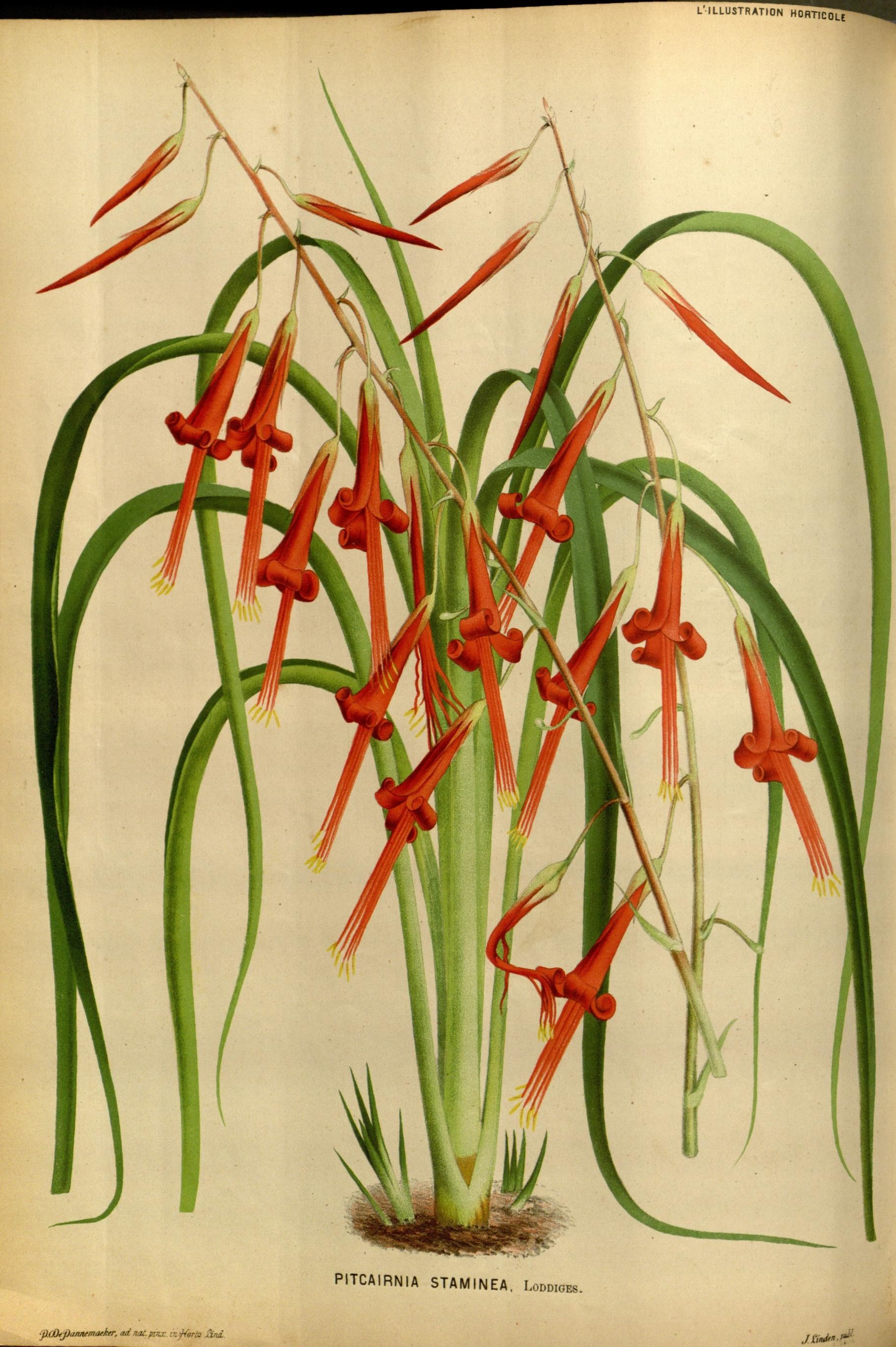

Scientific classification
- Kingdom: Plantae
- Clade: Tracheophytes
- Clade: Angiosperms
- Clade: Monocots
- Clade: Commelinids
- Order: Poales
- Family: Bromeliaceae
- Genus: Pitcairnia
- Species: P. staminea

Binomial name
- Pitcairnia staminea Loddiges

= Pitcairnia staminea =

Species of flowering plant

Pitcairnia staminea is a species of bromeliad in the genus Pitcairnia. This species is endemic to Brazil.

This red-flowered species often hybridizes with the white-flowered Pitcairnia albiflos, producing pink-flowered offspring.
