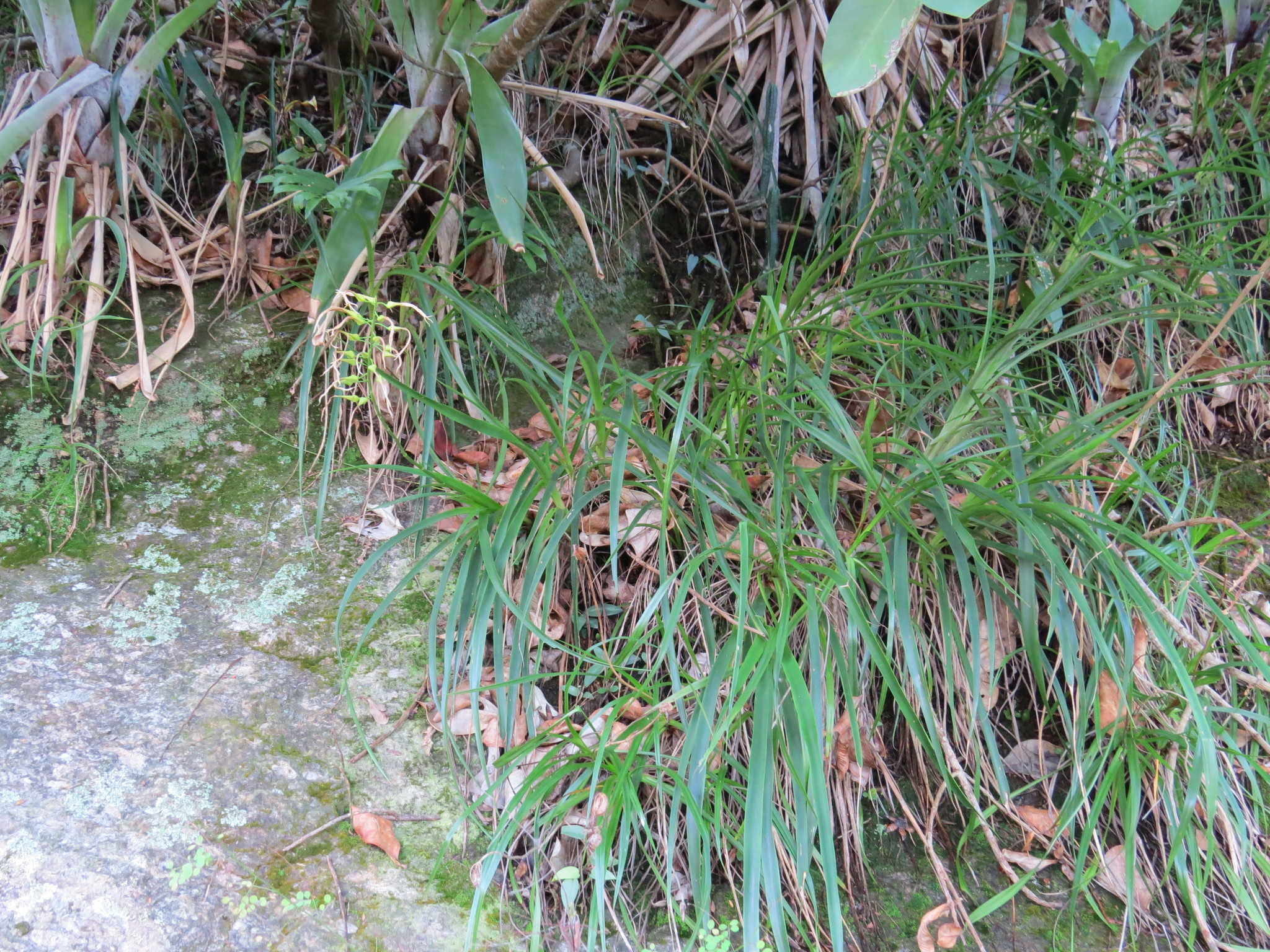

Scientific classification
- Kingdom: Plantae
- Clade: Embryophytes
- Clade: Tracheophytes
- Clade: Angiosperms
- Clade: Monocots
- Clade: Commelinids
- Order: Poales
- Family: Bromeliaceae
- Genus: Pitcairnia
- Species: P. albiflos

Binomial name
- Pitcairnia albiflos Herb.

Synonyms
- Cochliopetalum albiflos (Herb.) Beer; Codonanthes albiflos (Herb.) Raf.; Conanthes albiflos (Herb.) Raf.; Hepetis albiflos (Herb.) Mez; Cochliopetalum flavescens Beer; Cochliopetalum odoratum (Regel) Hemsl.; Cochliopetalum schuechii Beer; Pitcairnia albiflora Spreng.; Pitcairnia elata Liebm.; Pitcairnia flavescens (Beer) K.Koch; Pitcairnia flavescens var. inodora Regel; Pitcairnia odorata Regel; Tillandsia schuchii Beer & Fenzl

= Pitcairnia albiflos =

Species of flowering plant

Pitcairnia albiflos is a species of bromeliad in the family Bromeliaceae. This species is endemic to Brazil.

This white-flowered species often hybridizes with the red-flowered Pitcairnia staminea, producing pink-flowered offspring.
