= Pitcairnia ferrell-ingramiae =

Conservation status
- Vulnerable (IUCN 3.1)

Scientific classification
- Kingdom: Plantae
- Clade: Tracheophytes
- Clade: Angiosperms
- Clade: Monocots
- Clade: Commelinids
- Order: Poales
- Family: Bromeliaceae
- Genus: Pitcairnia
- Species: P. ferrell-ingramiae

Binomial name
- Pitcairnia ferrell-ingramiae H.Luther

Species of flowering plant

Pitcairnia ferrell-ingramiae is a species of plant in the family Bromeliaceae. It is endemic to Ecuador. Its natural habitat is subtropical or tropical moist montane forests. It is threatened by habitat loss.
