= Puya angelensis =

Conservation status
- Endangered (IUCN 3.1)

Scientific classification
- Kingdom: Plantae
- Clade: Tracheophytes
- Clade: Angiosperms
- Clade: Monocots
- Clade: Commelinids
- Order: Poales
- Family: Bromeliaceae
- Genus: Puya
- Species: P. angelensis

Binomial name
- Puya angelensis E.Gross & Rauh

Species of flowering plant

Puya angelensis is a species of plant in the family Bromeliaceae. It is endemic to Ecuador, where it is known from three locations in Carchi Province.

This plant grows in páramo and high Andean forest habitat. It is sometimes cultivated as a hedge because it is spiny.
