= Pitcairnia bergii =

Conservation status
- Endangered (IUCN 3.1)

Scientific classification
- Kingdom: Plantae
- Clade: Tracheophytes
- Clade: Angiosperms
- Clade: Monocots
- Clade: Commelinids
- Order: Poales
- Family: Bromeliaceae
- Genus: Pitcairnia
- Species: P. bergii

Binomial name
- Pitcairnia bergii H.Luther

Species of flowering plant

Pitcairnia bergii is a species of plant in the family Bromeliaceae. It is endemic to Ecuador, where it is known from only two subpopulations in El Oro Province. It grows in the forests of the lower Andes, where it is threatened by habitat destruction.
