= Pitcairnia fusca =

Conservation status
- Least Concern (IUCN 3.1)

Scientific classification
- Kingdom: Plantae
- Clade: Tracheophytes
- Clade: Angiosperms
- Clade: Monocots
- Clade: Commelinids
- Order: Poales
- Family: Bromeliaceae
- Genus: Pitcairnia
- Species: P. fusca

Binomial name
- Pitcairnia fusca H.Luther

Species of flowering plant

Pitcairnia fusca is a species of plant in the family Bromeliaceae. It is endemic to Ecuador. Its natural habitat is subtropical or tropical moist montane forests.
