= List of IUCN Red List vulnerable plants =

- Extinct in the wild (EW): 46 species
- Critically endangered (CR): 6,445 species
- Endangered (EN): 12,707 species
- Vulnerable (VU): 10,596 species
- Near threatened (NT, LR/cd): 4,880 species
- Least concern (LC): 35,732 species
- Data deficient (DD): 6,317 species
Plant species (IUCN, 2025.2)
- 76,864 extant species have been evaluated
- 70,547 of those are fully assessed (Note: excludes data deficient evaluations.)
- 40,612 are not threatened at present
- 29,935 are threatened (Note: Threatened comprises CR, EN and VU.)
- 187 to 892 are extinct or extinct in the wild:
  - 141 extinct (EX) species (Note: Chart omits extinct (EX) species)
  - 46 extinct in the wild (EW)
  - 648 possibly extinct [CR(PE)]
  - 57 possibly extinct in the wild [CR(PEW)]

Vulnerable (VU) species are considered to be facing a high risk of extinction in the wild.

As of September 2016, the International Union for Conservation of Nature (IUCN) lists 5430 vulnerable (VU) plant species. 25% of all evaluated plant species are listed as vulnerable. The IUCN also lists 244 subspecies and 235 varieties as vulnerable. No subpopulations of plants have been evaluated by the IUCN.

For a species to be assessed as vulnerable to extinction the best available evidence must meet quantitative criteria set by the IUCN designed to reflect "a high risk of extinction in the wild". Endangered and critically endangered species also meet the quantitative criteria of vulnerable species, and are listed separately. See: List of endangered plants, List of critically endangered plants. Vulnerable, endangered, and critically endangered species are collectively referred to as threatened species by the IUCN.

Additionally 1674 plant species (7.6% of those evaluated) are listed as data deficient, meaning there is insufficient information for a full assessment of conservation status. As these species typically have small distributions and/or populations, they are intrinsically likely to be threatened, according to the IUCN. While the category of data deficient indicates that no assessment of extinction risk has been made for the taxa, the IUCN notes that it may be appropriate to give them "the same degree of attention as threatened taxa, at least until their status can be assessed."

This is a complete list of vulnerable plant species, subspecies and varieties evaluated by the IUCN as of 2016.

== Algae ==
- Acrosorium papenfussii
- Austrofolium equatorianum
- Pseudolaingia hancockii

== Bryophytes ==
There are 25 bryophyte species assessed as vulnerable.

=== Mosses ===
- Ambuchanania leucobryoides
- Andoa berthelotiana
- Andreaea frigida
- Anomobryum lusitanicum
- Aschisma kansanum
- Brachythecium funkii
- Brachythecium geheebii
- Bryoerythrophyllum caledonicum
- Bryoerythrophyllum duellii
- Bryum austriacum
- Coscinodon horridus
- Donrichardsia macroneuron
- Exsertotheca intermedia
- Gradsteinia torrenticola
- Grimmia curviseta
- Gymnobarbula bicolor
- Hypnodontopsis apiculata
- Isothecium prolixum
- Leptodon longisetus
- Leucodon treleasei
- Leucoperichaetium eremophilum
- Microbryum longipes
- Orthotrichum dentatum
- Racomitrium nivale
- Rhynchostegiella trichophylla
- Rhynchostegium confusum
- Schistidium bryhnii
- Schistidium grande
- Schizymenium pontevedrense
- Seligeria irrigata
- Sphagnum lewisii
- Sphagnum novo-caledoniae
- Sphagnum sumapazense
- Takakia ceratophylla
- Tetrastichium fontanum
- Thamnobryum fernandesii
- Tortella limbata
- Weissia squarrosa

=== Liverworts ===
- Acrobolbus wilsonii
- Biantheridion undulifolium
- Calypogeia rhynchophylla
- Cololejeunea schaeferi
- Frullania jackii
- Frullania polysticta
- Fulfordianthus evansii
- Haesselia roraimensis
- Hattoria yakushimensis
- Herbertus borealis
- Herbertus norenus
- Lejeunea canariensis
- Lejeunea mandonii
- Marsupella profunda
- Micropterygium longicellulatum
- Myriocoleopsis fluviatilis
- Nardia huerlimannii
- Nowellia wrightii
- Perssoniella vitreocincta
- Riccia alatospora
- Riccia breidleri
- Scaphophyllum speciosum
- Sewardiella tuberifera

== Pteridophytes ==
There are 83 species and one subspecies of pteridophyte assessed as vulnerable.

=== Leptosporangiate ferns ===
There are 69 species in the class Polypodiopsida assessed as vulnerable.

==== Polypodiales ====
There are 61 species in the order Polypodiales assessed as vulnerable.

===== Aspleniaceae =====
- Asplenium aegaeum
- Asplenium ascensionis
- Asplenium compressum, plastic fern
- Asplenium creticum
- Asplenium hermannii-christii, Hermann Christ's asplenium
- Asplenium lolegnamense
- Asplenium majoricum
- Asplenium schweinfurthii

===== Athyriaceae =====
- Diplazium chimboanum
- Diplazium divisissimum
- Diplazium leptogrammoides
- Diplazium mildei
- Diplazium navarretei
- Diplazium oellgaardii
- Diplazium palaviense
- Diplazium rivale

===== Blechnaceae =====
- Blechnum eburneum
- Blechnum monomorphum
- Blechnum sodiroi

===== Dennstaedtiaceae =====
- Dennstaedtia macrosora
- Dennstaedtia paucirrhiza
- Dennstaedtia tryoniana

===== Dryopteridaceae =====
- Arachniodes webbiana
- Bolbitis riparia
- Ctenitis iriomotensis
- Cyrtomium nephrolepioides
- Dryopteris ardechensis
- Dryopteris liliana, buckler fern
- Dryopteris macropholis
- Dryopteris sweetiorum
- Elaphoglossum antisanae
- Elaphoglossum bryogenes
- Elaphoglossum ecuadorense
- Elaphoglossum heliconiaefolium
- Elaphoglossum hieronymi
- Elaphoglossum inciens
- Elaphoglossum marquisearum
- Elaphoglossum molle
- Elaphoglossum muriculatum
- Elaphoglossum oleandropsis
- Elaphoglossum yatesii
- Lastreopsis subsericea
- Polybotrya andina
- Polystichum bonapartii
- Polystichum marquesense
- Polystichum uahukaense

===== Polypodiaceae =====
- Archigrammitis marquesensis
- Campyloneurum oellgaardii
- Ceradenia melanopus
- Ceradenia semiadnata
- Grammitis pervillei
- Grammitis sechellarum
- Lellingeria paucipinnata
- Lellingeria strangeana
- Leptochilus cantoniensis
- Micropolypodium aphelolepis
- Oreogrammitis uapensis
- Polypodium latissimum
- Polypodium quitense

===== Thelypteridaceae =====
- Amauropelta aculeata
- Amauropelta appressa
- Amauropelta campii
- Amauropelta conformis
- Amauropelta correllii
- Amauropelta dodsonii
- Amauropelta elegantula
- Amauropelta euthythrix
- Amauropelta rosenstockii
- Amauropelta straminea
- Amauropelta subtilis
- Cyclosorus sino-acuminata
- Pneumatopteris blastophora
- Pneumatopteris humbertii
- Thelypteris quaylei

===== Other Polypodiales species =====
- Aleuritopteris albofusca
- Blotiella reducta
- Cleistoblechnum eburneum (syn. Blechnum eburneum)
- Dennstaedtia macrosora
- Dennstaedtia paucirrhiza
- Dennstaedtia tryoniana
- Hecistopteris pinnatifida
- Odontosoria africana
- Physematium indusiosum
- Pteris albersii
- Pteris incompleta, Laurisilva brake
- Tectaria villosa
- Trachypteris drakeana
- Vittaria reekmansii
- Woodsia indusiosa

==== Hymenophyllales ====
- Hymenophyllum alveolatum
- Trichomanes paucisorum

==== Cyatheales ====
- Cyathea bipinnata
- Cyathea halonata
- Cyathea hemiepiphytica
- Cyathea punctata
- Dicksonia arborescens, St Helena tree fern

==== Salviniales ====
- Marsilea schelpeana

=== Isoetopsida ===
- Isoetes azorica, Azorean quillwort
- Isoetes ecuadoriensis
- Isoetes herzogii
- Isoetes parvula
- Isoetes saracochensis

=== Lycopodiopsida ===
Clubmosses and firmosses

Species

- Huperzia ascendens
- Huperzia austroecuadorica
- Huperzia columnaris
- Huperzia compacta
- Huperzia espinosana
- Huperzia llanganatensis
- Huperzia scabrida
- Huperzia talpiphila
- Selaginella carinata

Subspecies

- Huperzia dacrydioides subsp. dura

== Gymnosperms ==
There are 156 species, seven subspecies, and 34 varieties of gymnosperm assessed as vulnerable.

=== Cycads ===
Species

- Ceratozamia mexicana
- Ceratozamia microstrobila
- Ceratozamia vovidesii
- Cycas aculeata
- Cycas armstrongii
- Cycas bifida
- Cycas cairnsiana
- Cycas collina
- Cycas cupida
- Cycas desolata
- Cycas diannanensis
- Cycas falcata
- Cycas guizhouensis
- Cycas inermis
- Cycas macrocarpa
- Cycas megacarpa
- Cycas micholitzii
- Cycas nathorstii
- Cycas nongnoochiae
- Cycas ophiolitica
- Cycas panzhihuaensis
- Cycas pectinata
- Cycas pranburiensis
- Cycas saxatilis
- Cycas seemannii
- Cycas segmentifida
- Cycas semota
- Cycas shanyaensis
- Cycas siamensis
- Cycas silvestris
- Cycas tuckeri
- Dioon angustifolium
- Dioon argenteum
- Dioon merolae
- Dioon purpusii
- Dioon tomasellii
- Encephalartos altensteinii, Eastern Cape cycad
- Encephalartos aplanatus
- Encephalartos barteri
- Encephalartos ghellinckii, Drakensberg cycad
- Encephalartos gratus, Mulanje cycad
- Encephalartos humilis, dwarf cycad
- Encephalartos manikensis, Gorongo cycad
- Encephalartos marunguensis, Marungu cycad
- Encephalartos ngoyanus, Ngoye cycad
- Encephalartos paucidentatus, Barberton cycad
- Encephalartos princeps, Kei cycad
- Encephalartos schaijesii
- Encephalartos schmitzii, Schmitz's cycad
- Encephalartos senticosus, Jozini cycad
- Encephalartos trispinosus, Bushman's river cycad
- Macrozamia cardiacensis
- Macrozamia conferta
- Macrozamia crassifolia
- Macrozamia humilis
- Macrozamia machinii
- Macrozamia occidua
- Macrozamia parcifolia
- Macrozamia platyrhachis
- Macrozamia secunda
- Stangeria eriopus, Natal grass cycad
- Zamia acuminata
- Zamia angustifolia
- Zamia cunaria
- Zamia encephalartoides
- Zamia erosa
- Zamia herrerae
- Zamia neurophyllidia
- Zamia oreillyi
- Zamia pumila
- Zamia soconuscensis
- Zamia standleyi
- Zamia stricta

Subspecies

- Encephalartos barteri subsp. barteri, West African cycad

=== Conifers ===
Species

- Abies fabri, Faber's fir
- Abies hidalgensis
- Abies recurvata, Min fir
- Abies squamata, flaky fir
- Afrocarpus mannii
- Agathis dammara, Amboina pitch tree
- Agathis flavescens, Tahan agathis
- Agathis lanceolata, Koghis kauri
- Agathis lenticula
- Agathis macrophylla, Fijian kauri pine
- Agathis moorei, Moore's kauri
- Agathis ovata, scrub kauri
- Amentotaxus formosana, Taiwan catkin yew
- Amentotaxus poilanei, Poilane's catkin yew
- Amentotaxus yunnanensis, Yunnan catkin yew
- Araucaria bernieri
- Araucaria biramulata
- Araucaria heterophylla, Norfolk Island pine
- Araucaria montana
- Araucaria schmidii
- Athrotaxis cupressoides, pencil pine
- Athrotaxis selaginoides, King William pine
- Callitris monticola, steelhead
- Callitris oblonga, Tasmanian cypress-pine
- Cathaya argyrophylla
- Cedrus libani, cedar of Lebanon
- Cephalotaxus mannii, Mann's yew plum
- Cephalotaxus oliveri, Oliver's plum yew
- Cupressus bakeri, Baker cypress
- Cupressus chengiana, Cheng cypress
- Cupressus macrocarpa, Monterey cypress
- Cupressus sargentii, Sargent cypress
- Fokienia hodginsii, Fujian cypress
- Juniperus angosturana
- Juniperus barbadensis, West Indies juniper
- Juniperus brevifolia, Azores juniper
- Juniperus tibetica, Tibetan juniper
- Keteleeria evelyniana
- Picea asperata, dragon spruce
- Picea brachytyla, Sargent's spruce
- Picea breweriana, Brewer's spruce
- Picea farreri, Farrer's spruce
- Picea likiangensis, Likiang spruce
- Picea morrisonicola, Mount Morrison spruce
- Picea torano, tigertail spruce
- Pilgerodendron uviferum, Guaitecas cypress
- Pinus greggii, Gregg's pine
- Pinus krempfii, Krempf's pine
- Pinus merkusii, Merkus's pine
- Pinus muricata, bishop pine
- Pinus rzedowskii, Rzedowski's pine
- Pinus tecunumanii, Schwerdtfeger's pine
- Pinus tropicalis, tropical pine
- Pseudolarix amabilis, Chinese golden larch
- Pseudotaxus chienii, whiteberry yew
- Pseudotsuga sinensis, Chinese Douglas-fir
- Taiwania cryptomerioides, coffin tree
- Taxus mairei, Maire's yew
- Thuja koraiensis, Korean arbor-vitae
- Torreya californica, California nutmeg
- Torreya fargesii, Farges nutmeg tree
- Tsuga forrestii, Forrest's hemlock

Subspecies

- Abies cilicica subsp. isaurica
- Abies fabri subsp. fabri
- Abies fabri subsp. minensis, Minshan fir
- Agathis robusta subsp. nesophila
- Pinus cembroides subsp. lagunae
- Pinus torreyana subsp. insularis, Santa rosa Island pine

Varieties

- Abies durangensis var. coahuilensis
- Abies fargesii var. faxoniana
- Abies recurvata var. ernestii
- Abies recurvata var. recurvata
- Abies veitchii var. sikokiana, Shikoku fir
- Abies vejarii var. macrocarpa
- Abies vejarii var. mexicana
- Abies vejarii var. vejarii
- Cedrus libani var. brevifolia, Cyprus cedar
- Cedrus libani var. libani
- Chamaecyparis obtusa var. formosana
- Cupressus chengiana var. chengiana
- Cupressus torulosa var. gigantea
- Juniperus barbadensis var. lucayana, Bahaman juniper
- Juniperus blancoi var. blancoi
- Juniperus blancoi var. huehuentensis
- Juniperus blancoi var. mucronata
- Juniperus deppeana var. robusta
- Juniperus flaccida var. martinezii
- Juniperus pingii var. pingii
- Larix potaninii var. chinensis
- Picea asperata var. asperata
- Picea brachytyla var. brachytyla
- Picea brachytyla var. complanata
- Picea likiangensis var. likiangensis
- Picea likiangensis var. rubescens
- Pinus arizonica var. cooperi
- Pinus arizonica var. stormiae
- Pinus armandii var. dabeshanensis
- Pinus brutia var. pityusa, Pitsundian pine
- Pinus caribaea var. bahamensis, Bahamas pine
- Pinus radiata var. binata
- Pseudotsuga sinensis var. brevifolia
- Pseudotsuga sinensis var. sinensis

==== Podocarpaceae ====
- Dacrydium leptophyllum
- Dacrydium medium
- Nageia motleyi
- Parasitaxus usta
- Podocarpus angustifolius
- Podocarpus archboldii
- Podocarpus fasciculus
- Podocarpus gibbsiae
- Podocarpus lophatus
- Podocarpus matudae
- Podocarpus pallidus
- Podocarpus parlatorei
- Podocarpus polyspermus
- Podocarpus polystachyus
- Podocarpus ridleyi
- Podocarpus rusbyi
- Podocarpus salignus, willow-leaf podocarp
- Prumnopitys andina
- Prumnopitys ladei, synonym of Pectinopitys ladei, Mt Spurgeon black pine
- Prumnopitys montana
- Retrophyllum rospigliosii

=== Gnetopsida ===
- Gnetum acutum
- Gnetum contractum
- Gnetum globosum

== Dicotyledons ==
There are 4545 species, 230 subspecies, and 197 varieties of dicotyledon assessed as vulnerable.

=== Apiales ===
There are 108 species in the order Apiales assessed as vulnerable.

==== Apiaceae ====
- Berula bracteata, jellico
- Bupleurum capillare
- Bupleurum kosopolianskyi, Kozo-poljanskyi's thoroughwax
- Bupleurum wittmannii, Wittmann's thoroughwax
- Carum grossheimii, Grossheim's caraway
- Carum lacuum
- Cotopaxia asplundii
- Cryptotaenia flahaultii, Flahault's cryptotaenia
- Eryngium variifolium
- Ferula caucasica, Caucasian giant fennel
- Ferula latipinna
- Hydrocotyle hexagona
- Hydrocotyle yanghuangensis
- Lefebvrea droopii
- Lefebvrea kupense
- Mandenovia komarovii, Komarov's mandenovia
- Nirarathamnos asarifolius
- Oreofraga morrisiana
- Pimpinella lazica, Lazian burnet saxifrage
- Pimpinella schatilensis, Shatilian anise
- Rughidia milleri
- Seseli cuneifolium, wedge-leaved meadow saxifrage
- Seseli saxicolum, Saxicolous seseli
- Thorella verticillato-inundata

==== Araliaceae ====
- Aralia chinensis
- Aralia debilis
- Aralia javanica
- Aralia malabarica
- Aralia tibetana
- Astropanax mannii
- Astropanax stolzii
- Brassaiopsis minor
- Brassaiopsis simplex
- Cheirodendron forbesii
- Cussonia bancoensis
- Cussonia gamtoosensis
- Dendropanax alberti-smithii
- Dendropanax blakeanus
- Dendropanax lanceifolius
- Dendropanax marginiferus
- Dendropanax ovalifolius
- Dendropanax portlandianus
- Dendropanax productus
- Dendropanax sessiliflorus
- Frodinia gleasonii
- Heptapleurum beccarianum
- Heptapleurum capituliferum
- Heptapleurum chapanum
- Heptapleurum multinervium
- Heptapleurum nanocephalum (Heptapleurum sp. nov. nanocephalum)
- Heptapleurum nervosum
- Macropanax chienii
- Macropanax concinnus
- Meryta choristantha
- Meryta lucida
- Meryta pauciflora, Rarotonga meryta
- Meryta sinclairii
- Meryta sonchifolia
- Myodocarpus angustialatus
- Oreopanax arcanus
- Oreopanax candamoanus
- Oreopanax cissoides
- Oreopanax echinops
- Oreopanax hedraeostrobilus
- Oreopanax ischnolobus
- Oreopanax jelskii
- Oreopanax obscurus
- Oreopanax oerstedianus
- Oreopanax peltatus
- Oreopanax raimondii
- Oreopanax rosei
- Oreopanax sanderianus
- Oreopanax sessiliflorus
- Oreopanax stenophyllus
- Osmoxylon arrhenicum
- Osmoxylon chrysanthum
- Osmoxylon corneri
- Osmoxylon ellipsoideum
- Osmoxylon lanceolatum
- Osmoxylon reburrum
- Osmoxylon whitmorei
- Pentapanax castanopsisicola, synonym of Aralia castanopsicola
- Plerandra costata
- Plerandra nono
- Plerandra polydactylis
- Plerandra sp. "taomensis"
- Plerandra sp. "tronchetii"
- Plerandra veitchii
- Polyscias crassa
- Polyscias crenata
- Polyscias kikuyuensis, parasol tree
- Polyscias prolifera
- Polyscias pulgarense
- Polyscias sechellarum
- Pseudopanax scopoliae
- Pseudosciadium balansae, delarbrea balansae
- Schefflera hierniana, synonym of Astropanax barteri
- Sciodaphyllum chartaceum
- Sciodaphyllum diplodactylum
- Sciodaphyllum dolichostylum
- Sciodaphyllum euryphyllum
- Sciodaphyllum seibertii
- Sciodaphyllum troyanum
- Sciodaphyllum urbanianum
- Sinopanax formosanus
- Tetrapanax tibetanus

=== Aquifoliales ===
==== Aquifoliaceae (Hollies) ====
Species

- Ilex abscondita
- Ilex acutidenticulata
- Ilex anonoides
- Ilex aracamuniana
- Ilex attenuata
- Ilex brevipedicellata
- Ilex caniensis
- Ilex costaricensis
- Ilex cowanii
- Ilex ericoides
- Ilex florifera
- Ilex glabella
- Ilex guaiquinimae
- Ilex holstii
- Ilex jelskii
- Ilex karuaiana
- Ilex lasseri
- Ilex lechleri
- Ilex maingayi
- Ilex mathewsii
- Ilex neblinensis
- Ilex palawanica
- Ilex pallida
- Ilex parvifructa
- Ilex praetermissa
- Ilex puberula
- Ilex quercetorum
- Ilex tolucana
- Ilex trachyphylla
- Ilex vaccinoides
- Ilex vulcanicola

Subspecies

- Ilex perado subsp. platyphylla
- Ilex vomitoria subsp. chiapensis

Varieties

- Ilex mitis var. schliebenii
- Ilex savannarum var. morichei

==== Stemonuraceae ====
- Cantleya corniculata
- Codiocarpus merrittii
- Gastrolepis alticola
- Gomphandra apoensis
- Gomphandra comosa
- Gomphandra fernandoi
- Gomphandra flavicarpa
- Gomphandra oligantha
- Gomphandra simularensis
- Gomphandra subrostrata
- Medusanthera samoensis
- Stemonurus celebicus
- Whitmorea grandiflora

=== Aristolochiales ===
- Aristolochia cucurbitifolia
- Aristolochia cucurbitoides
- Aristolochia hainanensis
- Aristolochia obliqua
- Aristolochia thwaitesii
- Aristolochia yunnanensis
- Asarum crispulatum
- Asarum fudsinoi
- Asarum maximum
- Asarum simile
- Pararistolochia ceropegioides
- Pararistolochia goldieana

=== Asterales ===
Species

- Achyrocline hallii
- Acmella leucantha
- Adenostemma harlingii
- Adenostemma zakii
- Aequatorium jamesonii
- Aequatorium limonense
- Aequatorium rimachianum
- Aetheolaena rosana
- Ageratina cuencana
- Ageratina dendroides
- Ageratum iltisii
- Anacyclus pyrethrum, Atlas daisy
- Anaphalis beddomei
- Anaphalis leptophylla
- Anaphalis wightiana
- Aphanactis antisanensis
- Argyroxiphium caliginis, Eke silversword
- Aristeguietia arborea
- Artemisia molinieri
- Aster miyagii
- Ayapana ecuadorensis
- Ayapanopsis luteynii
- Baccharis hambatensis
- Baccharis hieronymi
- Barnadesia aculeata
- Bidens amplectens
- Bidens campylotheca, Ko`oko`olau
- Bidens conjuncta
- Bidens eatonii
- Bidens mannii
- Bidens micrantha
- Bidens molokaiensis, Molokai beggarticks
- Bidens populifolia, Oahu beggarticks
- Blepharispermum hirtum
- Brachyglottis huntii, Chatham Island Christmas tree
- Cacosmia harlingii
- Cacosmia hieronymi
- Calea harlingii
- Calea kingii
- Canariothamnus hermosae
- Carlina onopordifolia
- Carthamus balearicus
- Centaurea corymbosa
- Centaurea daralagoezica, Daralagezian tomanthea
- Centaurea dubjanskyi
- Centaurea gadorensis
- Centaurea immanuelis-loewii
- Centaurea jankae
- Centaurea kalambakensis
- Centaurea niederi
- Centaurea peucedanifolia
- Centaurea pulvinata
- Cheirolophus satarataensis
- Cheirolophus tagananensis
- Cirsium ducellieri
- Cirsium oblongifolium, oblong-leaved thistle
- Cirsium trachylepis, rough-scaly thistle
- Clibadium alatum
- Clibadium harlingii
- Clibadium manabiense
- Clibadium napoense
- Clibadium pastazense
- Clibadium sprucei
- Clibadium zakii
- Commidendrum rugosum, scrubwood
- Cotula filifolia
- Cotula moseleyi
- Cousinia woronowii, Voronov's cousinia
- Crassocephalum bauchiense
- Crossothamnus gentryi
- Crepis purpurea
- Critonia eggersii
- Critoniopsis cotopaxensis
- Critoniopsis harlingii
- Critoniopsis jaramilloi
- Critoniopsis palaciosii
- Critoniopsis sevillana
- Cronquistianthus bulliferus
- Cronquistianthus niveus
- Cronquistianthus origanoides
- Darwiniothamnus alternifolius
- Dasphyllum argenteum
- Dendrophorbium balsapampae
- Dendrophorbium dodsonii
- Dendrophorbium ingens
- Dendrophorbium pericaule
- Dendrophorbium pururu
- Dendrophorbium scytophyllum
- Dendrophorbium solisii
- Diplostephium asplundii
- Diplostephium barclayanum
- Dubautia reticulata, net-veined dubautia
- Echinops foliosus, polyphyllous globe thistle
- Erato sodiroi
- Fitchia nutans
- Fitchia tahitensis
- Fleischmannia aequinoctialis
- Fleischmannia harlingii
- Fleischmannia lloensis
- Floscaldasia azorelloides
- Gnaphalium chimborazense
- Grosvenoria hypargyra
- Grosvenoria rimbachii
- Guevaria alvaroi
- Gynoxys azuayensis
- Gynoxys baccharoides
- Gynoxys chimborazensis
- Gynoxys chingualensis
- Gynoxys colanensis
- Gynoxys dielsiana
- Gynoxys jaramilloi
- Gynoxys laurifolia
- Gynoxys miniphylla
- Gynoxys multibracteifera
- Gynoxys pulchella
- Gynoxys reinaldii
- Gynoxys rimbachii
- Gynura sechellensis
- Hebeclinium obtusisquamosum
- Helianthus anomalus
- Helichrysum biafranum
- Helichrysum gossypinum
- Hieracium pangoriense
- Jacobaea buschiana, groundsel of Busch
- Joseanthus sparrei
- Jungia ovata
- Jurinea alata, winged jurinea
- Jurinea bellidioides, English daisy-like jurinea
- Jurinea brachypappa, short-thistledowned jurinea
- Jurinea coronopifolia, wart-cress-leaved jurinea
- Jurinea exuberans, profuse jurinea
- Jurinea woronowii, Voronov's jurinea
- Kemulariella abchasica, Abkhazian kemulariella
- Kemulariella colchica, Colchic kemulariella
- Kleinia scottii
- Koyamacalia pseudotaimingasa
- Lactuca singularis
- Lactuca tetrantha
- Launaea crepoides
- Lecocarpus lecocarpoides
- Leontodon microcephalus
- Liabum barclayae
- Libinhania nimmoana, syn. Helichrysum nimmoanum
- Libinhania nivea
- Libinhania pendula
- Libinhania suffruticosa, syn. Helichrysum suffruticosum
- Lopholaena deltombei
- Loricaria ollgaardii
- Loricaria scolopendra
- Melanodendron integrifolium, black cabbage tree
- Mikaniopsis maitlandii
- Mikaniopsis vitalba
- Monactis holwayae
- Monactis lojaensis
- Monactis pallatangensis
- Monticalia befarioides
- Monticalia microdon
- Monticalia rosmarinifolia
- Munnozia asplundii
- Munnozia campii
- Munnozia liaboides
- Mutisia discoidea
- Mutisia magnifica
- Mutisia microcephala
- Mutisia microphylla
- Mutisia rimbachii
- Nananthea perpusilla
- Notonia shevaroyensis
- Oblivia ceronii
- Oligactis asplundii
- Oligactis ecuadoriensis, synonym of Sampera ecuadoriensis
- Oritrophium llanganatense
- Oritrophium ollgaardii
- Pappobolus ecuadoriensis
- Pappobolus juncosae
- Pappobolus nigrescens
- Pappobolus sanchezii
- Paragynoxys regis
- Pentacalia carchiensis
- Pentacalia carmelana
- Pentacalia corazonensis
- Pentacalia dorrii
- Pentacalia floribunda
- Pentacalia hillii
- Pentacalia hurtadoi
- Pentacalia lanceolifolia
- Pentacalia luteynorum
- Pentacalia millei
- Pentacalia moronensis
- Pentacalia napoensis
- Pentacalia palaciosii
- Pentacalia ruficaulis
- Pentacalia sevillana
- Pentacalia zakii
- Pentacalia zamorana
- Phalacraea ecuadorensis
- Plagiocheilus peduncularis
- Plagius flosculosus
- Pluchea obovata
- Psephellus erivanensis, Yerevanian centaury
- Psephellus kolakovskyi, Kolakovsky's psephellus
- Pseudogynoxys sodiroi
- Pulicaria vieraeoides
- Santolina elegans
- Scalesia aspera
- Scalesia baurii, Pinta sunflower-tree
- Scalesia crockeri
- Scalesia helleri
- Scalesia incisa
- Scalesia pedunculata
- Scalesia retroflexa
- Scalesia stewartii, Stewart's scalesia
- Scalesia villosa, longhaired scalesia
- Sciadocephala asplundii
- Scorzonera czerepanovii, Czerepanov's scorzonera
- Senecio caespitosus
- Solanecio gynuroides
- Stevia bertholdii
- Stevia crenata
- Verbesina kingii
- Verbesina pseudoclausseni
- Verbesina rivetii
- Verbesina rupestris
- Verbesina saloyensis
- Vernonia bamendae
- Vernonia unicata
- Vernonia zollingerianoides
- Viguiera sodiroi
- Werneria graminifolia
- Xenophyllum rigidum
- Xenophyllum roseum

Subspecies

- Argyroxiphium sandwicense subsp. macrocephalum
- Bidens campylotheca subsp. campylotheca
- Centaurea attica subsp. megarensis
- Darwiniothamnus lancifolius subsp. glabriusculus
- Scalesia baurii subsp. baurii
- Scalesia baurii subsp. hopkinsii
- Scalesia helleri subsp. helleri
- Scalesia helleri subsp. santacruzinua

Varieties

- Bidens hendersonensis var. hendersonensis
- Bidens hendersonensis var. subspathulata

=== Austrobaileyales ===
==== Schisandraceae ====
- Illicium ekmanii
- Illicium mexicanum
- Illicium ternstroemioides

=== Boraginales ===
==== Boraginaceae ====
Species

- Cynoglossum imeretinum, Imeretian hound's-tongue
- Echiochilon pulvinata
- Echium callithyrsum
- Echium gentianoides
- Ehretia scrobiculata
- Heliotropium aff. wagneri
- Heliotropium anderssonii
- Heliotropium argenteum
- Heliotropium dentatum
- Heliotropium kuriense
- Heliotropium nigricans
- Heliotropium paulayanum
- Heliotropium riebeckii
- Heliotropium wagneri
- Myosotis azorica
- Omphalodes kusnetzovii, Kuznetsov's navelwort
- Omphalodes kuzinskyanae
- Rochefortia acrantha
- Symphytum cycladense
- Tiquilia nesiotica
- Tournefortia rufo-sericea, rufous-haired tournefortia
- Trichodesma scotti
- Varronia clarendonensis
- Wellstedia socotrana

Varieties

- Cordia sebestena var. caymanensis

==== Cordiaceae ====
- Cordia anisophylla
- Cordia cicatricosa
- Cordia croatii
- Cordia harrisii
- Cordia mandimbana
- Cordia mukuensis
- Cordia platythyrsa
- Cordia ramirezii
- Cordia stuhlmannii
- Cordia troyana
- Cordia valenzuelana

=== Brassicales ===
There are 41 species and five subspecies in Capparales assessed as vulnerable.

==== Brassicaceae ====
Species

- Alyssum pyrenaicum
- Arabis kazbegi, Kazbegian rock-cress
- Barbamine ketzkhovelii, Ketskhoveli's barbarea
- Biscutella neustriaca
- Biscutella vincentina
- Brassica glabrescens
- Callothlaspi abchasicum, Abkhazian callothlaspi
- Cardamine lojanensis
- Cochlearia tatrae, Tatra scurvy-grass
- Crambe arborea
- Crambe gomerae
- Crambe scaberrima
- Draba meskhetica, Meskhetian whitelow grass
- Draba splendens
- Draba spruceana
- Draba steyermarkii
- Draba stylosa
- Erysimum caspicum, Caspian treacle mustard
- Erysimum contractum, constricted treacle mustard
- Erysimum pieninicum
- Farsetia inconspicua
- Farsetia socotrana
- Hemicrambe townsendii
- Iberis runemarkii
- Isatis platyloba
- Lachnocapsa spathulata
- Lepidium ecuadoriense
- Lepidium quitense
- Lepidium violaceum
- Noccaea sintenisii, Sintensis' penny-cress
- Parolinia schizogynoides
- Rorippa hayanica
- Sameraria glastifolia, sameraria
- Sisymbrium cavanillesianum
- Sterigmostemum acanthocarpum, prickly-fruited sterigmostemum

Subspecies

- Cardamine pratensis subsp. atlantica
- Nasturtium africanum subsp. africanum
- Nasturtium africanum subsp. mesatlanticum
- Sisymbrella aspera subsp. munbyana

==== Capparaceae ====
- Boscia arabica
- Capparis mollicella
- Capparis sandwichiana, native caper
- Capparis sprucei
- Maerua elegans

==== Resedaceae ====
Subspecies

- Reseda battandieri subsp. limicola

=== Buxales ===
==== Buxaceae ====
- Buxus arborea
- Buxus obtusifolia

=== Canellales ===
==== Canellaceae ====
- Cinnamodendron corticosum
- Cinnamosma macrocarpa
- Warburgia salutaris
- Warburgia stuhlmannii

==== Winteraceae ====
- Zygogynum cristatum

=== Campanulales ===
==== Campanulaceae ====
Species

- Adenophora taquetii
- Asyneuma giganteum
- Burmeistera brachyandra
- Burmeistera crispiloba
- Burmeistera cylindrocarpa
- Burmeistera loejtnantii
- Burmeistera oblongifolia
- Burmeistera racemiflora
- Burmeistera truncata
- Campanula dzyschrica, Dzyshrian campanula
- Campanula engurensis, Engurian bellflower
- Campanula fonderwisii
- Campanula kolakovskyi, Kolakovskiy's bellflower
- Campanula mairei
- Campanula pontica, Pontic campanula
- Campanula sabatia
- Campanula suanetica, Svanetian bellflower
- Centropogon arcuatus
- Centropogon baezanus
- Centropogon eurystomus
- Centropogon fimbriatulus
- Centropogon jeppesenii
- Centropogon licayensis
- Centropogon papillosus
- Centropogon quebradanus
- Centropogon rubrodentatus
- Centropogon saltuum
- Centropogon trachyanthus
- Centropogon trichodes
- Clermontia hawaiiensis, Hawaii clermontia
- Clermontia oblongifolia
- Cyanea aculeatiflora, prickly-flower cyanea
- Cyanea fauriei
- Cyanea habenata
- Cyanea hardyi
- Cyanea leptostegia, giant koke'e cyanea
- Cyanea solenocalyx, Molokai cyanea
- Cyanea tritomantha
- Lobelia columnaris
- Lobelia gilletii
- Lobelia hereroensis
- Lysipomia acaulis
- Lysipomia caespitosa
- Lysipomia oellgaardii
- Siphocampylus affinis
- Siphocampylus humboldtianus
- Trimeris scaevolifolia, St Helena lobelia
- Wahlenbergia angustifolia, small bellflower

Subspecies

- Clermontia oblongifolia subsp. oblongifolia
- Wahlenbergia ramosissima subsp. ramosissima

==== Goodeniaceae ====
- Scaevola chanii
- Scaevola muluensis
- Scaevola verticillata

=== Caryophyllales ===
==== Aizoaceae ====
- Antimima eendornensis
- Conophytum halenbergense
- Frithia pulchra
- Jensenobotrya lossowiana
- Juttadinteria kovisimontana
- Lithops francisci
- Lithops hermetica
- Lithops werneri
- Ruschianthus falcatus
- Schwantesia constanceae

==== Amaranthaceae ====
Species

- Achyranthes splendens, Maui chaff flower
- Alternanthera areschougii
- Alternanthera corymbiformis
- Alternanthera flavicoma
- Alternanthera galapagensis
- Alternanthera grandis
- Alternanthera helleri
- Alternanthera snodgrassii
- Alternathera subscaposa (as Lithophila subscaposa)
- Froelichia juncea
- Froelichia nudicaulis
- Iresine pedicellata
- Pleuropetalum darwinii
- Psilotrichum axilliflorum

Subspecies

- Alternanthera filifolia subsp. glauca
- Alternanthera filifolia subsp. glaucescens
- Alternanthera filifolia subsp. microcephala
- Alternanthera filifolia subsp. nudicaulis
- Alternanthera filifolia subsp. pintensis
- Alternanthera filifolia subsp. rabidensis
- Froelichia juncea subsp. alata
- Froelichia juncea subsp. juncea
- Froelichia nudicaulis subsp. curta
- Froelichia nudicaulis subsp. lanigera
- Froelichia nudicaulis subsp. nudicaulis

Varieties

- Achyranthes splendens var. splendens

==== Cactus species ====
- Acharagma roseanum
- Arrojadoa dinae
- Arthrocereus melanurus
- Astrophytum asterias, sand dollar cactus
- Astrophytum coahuilense
- Astrophytum ornatum
- Austrocylindropuntia lagopus
- Brasilicereus estevesii
- Brasilicereus markgrafii
- Browningia altissima
- Cephalocereus nizandensis
- Cephalocereus totolapensis
- Cereus fricii
- Cereus pierre-braunianus
- Cereus vargasianus
- Cipocereus bradei
- Copiapoa megarhiza
- Corryocactus erectus
- Coryphantha hintoniorum
- Cylindropuntia anteojoensis
- Cylindropuntia santamaria
- Discocactus bahiensis
- Discocactus boliviensis
- Discocactus horstii
- Disocactus phyllanthoides
- Echinocereus mapimiensis
- Echinocereus maritimus
- Echinocereus pulchellus
- Echinopsis albispinosa
- Echinopsis ancistrophora
- Echinopsis backebergii
- Echinopsis chrysantha
- Echinopsis famatinensis
- Echinopsis terscheckii
- Echinopsis thelegona
- Echinopsis thelegonoides
- Eriosyce confinis
- Eriosyce napina
- Eriosyce odieri
- Eriosyce recondita
- Eriosyce rodentiophila
- Eriosyce senilis
- Eriosyce taltalensis
- Escobaria robbinsorum, Cochise pincushion cactus
- Espostoopsis dybowskii
- Facheiroa cephaliomelana
- Ferocactus fordii
- Ferocactus herrerae
- Ferocactus macrodiscus
- Ferocactus robustus
- Ferocactus tiburonensis
- Ferocactus wislizeni, fishhook barrel cactus
- Frailea gracillima
- Frailea phaeodisca
- Frailea schilinzkyana
- Gymnocalycium marianae
- Gymnocalycium paraguayense
- Gymnocalycium uruguayense
- Hylocereus minutiflorus
- Hylocereus stenopterus
- Leptocereus paniculatus
- Lophophora diffusa
- Lophophora williamsii, peyote
- Mammillaria armillata
- Mammillaria berkiana – synonym of Mammillaria mercadensis
- Mammillaria bocensis
- Mammillaria bombycina
- Mammillaria carretii
- Mammillaria deherdtiana
- Mammillaria eriacantha
- Mammillaria halei
- Mammillaria jaliscana
- Mammillaria longimamma
- Mammillaria luethyi
- Mammillaria multidigitata, synonym of Cochemiea multidigitata
- Mammillaria oteroi
- Mammillaria perbella
- Mammillaria petrophila
- Mammillaria pringlei
- Mammillaria schiedeana
- Mammillaria tayloriorum
- Matucana krahnii
- Matucana oreodoxa
- Matucana paucicostata
- Melocactus pachyacanthus
- Melocactus salvadorensis
- Melocactus schatzlii
- Melocactus violaceus
- Micranthocereus albicephalus
- Mila caespitosa
- Neobuxbaumia euphorbioides
- Neobuxbaumia polylopha
- Opuntia schumannii
- Pachycereus gatesii
- Pachycereus grandis
- Pachycereus militaris
- Parodia alacriportana
- Parodia concinna
- Parodia fusca
- Parodia glaucina
- Parodia haselbergii
- Parodia langsdorfii
- Parodia neoarechavaletae
- Parodia ottonis
- Parodia oxycostata
- Parodia permutata
- Parodia schumanniana
- Parodia scopa
- Parodia turecekiana
- Peniocereus castellae
- Peniocereus chiapensis
- Peniocereus cuixmalensis
- Peniocereus fosterianus
- Peniocereus oaxacensis
- Peniocereus rosei
- Peniocereus tepalcatepecanus
- Pereskia marcanoi
- Pereskia portulacifolia
- Pereskia zinniiflora
- Pierrebraunia bahiensis
- Pilosocereus aureispinus
- Pilosocereus parvus
- Rhipsalidopsis gaertneri, syn. Schlumbergera gaertneri, Easter cactus
- Rhipsalis oblonga
- Rhipsalis pilocarpa
- Rhipsalis russellii
- Schlumbergera microsphaerica
- Schlumbergera opuntioides
- Schlumbergera truncata
- Sclerocactus sileri
- Selenicereus murrillii
- Stenocereus alamosensis
- Strombocactus disciformis
- Strophocactus brasiliensis, syn. Pseudoacanthocereus brasiliensis
- Tacinga braunii
- Turbinicarpus saueri
- Turbinicarpus valdezianus
- Weberocereus bradei
- Weberocereus tonduzii

==== Caryophyllaceae ====
Species

- Cerastium dinaricum
- Cerastium svanicum, Svanetian chickweed
- Dianthus hypanicus
- Dianthus kubanensis, Kubanian poppy
- Gymnocarpos bracteatus
- Gymnocarpos kuriensis
- Gypsophila robusta, robust chalk plant
- Gypsophila szovitsii, Szovits' gypsophila
- Herniaria algarvica
- Moehringia hypanica
- Petrocoptis grandiflora
- Petrocoptis pseudoviscosa
- Polycarpaea hassalensis
- Polycarpaea kuriensis
- Polycarpaea paulayana
- Silene alpicola, alpine catchfly
- Silene hicesiae
- Spergularia doumerguei
- Spergularia embergeri

Subspecies

- Dianthus cintranus subsp. cintranus

==== Chenopodiaceae ====
- Anabasis eugeniae, Eugenia's anabasis
- Beta nana
- Chenopodium helenense, St Helena goosefoot
- Salicornia veneta, Venice salicorne

==== Didiereaceae ====
- Alluaudia ascendens
- Alluaudia comosa
- Didierea trollii

==== Droseraceae ====
- Dionaea muscipula, Venus flytrap
- Drosera bequaertii

==== Nepenthaceae ====
- Nepenthes argentii
- Nepenthes bicalcarata
- Nepenthes bongso
- Nepenthes campanulata, bell-shaped pitcher-plant
- Nepenthes danseri
- Nepenthes distillatoria
- Nepenthes edwardsiana
- Nepenthes ephippiata
- Nepenthes eymae
- Nepenthes faizaliana
- Nepenthes fallax
- Nepenthes fusca
- Nepenthes gantungensis
- Nepenthes glabrata
- Nepenthes hamata
- Nepenthes inermis
- Nepenthes insignis
- Nepenthes lowii
- Nepenthes macfarlanei
- Nepenthes macrovulgaris
- Nepenthes madagascariensis
- Nepenthes merrilliana
- Nepenthes mikei
- Nepenthes mira
- Nepenthes naga
- Nepenthes northiana
- Nepenthes ovata
- Nepenthes pervillei
- Nepenthes pitopangii
- Nepenthes ramispina
- Nepenthes rhombicaulis
- Nepenthes sibuyanensis
- Nepenthes singalana
- Nepenthes spathulata
- Nepenthes spectabilis
- Nepenthes tomoriana
- Nepenthes villosa

==== Nyctaginaceae ====
- Neea darienensis
- Pisonia artensis
- Pisonia donnellsmithii

==== Polygonaceae ====
Species

- Calligonum paletzkianum
- Coccoloba coriacea
- Coccoloba matudae
- Coccoloba tiliacea
- Coccoloba troyana
- Fallopia koreana
- Rumex andinus
- Rumex rupestris, shore dock

Varieties

- Triplaris setosa var. woytkowskii

==== Other Caryophyllales species ====
- Acantholimon aegaeum
- Asteropeia densiflora
- Asteropeia labatii
- Asteropeia matrambody
- Asteropeia mcphersonii
- Asteropeia micraster
- Portulaca kuriensis

=== Celastrales ===
==== Celastraceae ====
Species

- Bhesa ceylanica
- Brexia madagascariensis subsp. microcarpa
- Campylostemon mitophorus
- Elaeodendron laneanum, Bermuda olivewood
- Euonymus angulatus
- Euonymus lanceifolia
- Euonymus walkeri
- Glyptopetalum lawsonii
- Glyptopetalum palawanense
- Gyminda orbicularis
- Gymnosporia bachmannii
- Kokoona coriacea
- Kokoona leucoclada
- Kokoona sabahana
- Kokoona sessilis
- Lophopetalum sessilifolium
- Maytenus abbottii
- Maytenus curtisii
- Maytenus harenensis
- Maytenus jefeana
- Maytenus matudai
- Maytenus microcarpa
- Maytenus oleosa
- Maytenus ponceana
- Maytenus sp. A
- Maytenus stipitata
- Microtropis argentea
- Microtropis fascicularis
- Microtropis keningauensis
- Microtropis ovata
- Microtropis rigida
- Microtropis sabahensis
- Microtropis sarawakensis
- Microtropis tenuis
- Peritassa killipii
- Perrottetia excelsa
- Pleurostylia serrulata
- Pseudosalacia streyi
- Salacia arenicola
- Salacia lebrunii
- Salacia lenticellosa
- Salacia lucida
- Salacia miegei
- Salacia nigra
- Salacia oblonga
- Salacia volubilis
- Sarawakodendron filamentosum
- Thyrsosalacia racemosa
- Zinowiewia madsenii

Subspecies

- Elaeodendron pininsulare subsp. poyaense

Varieties

- Kokoona littoralis var. bakoensis
- Kokoona littoralis var. longifolia
- Maytenus arbutifolia var. sidamoensis
- Microtropis grandifolia var. grandifolia
- Microtropis grandifolia var. longipetiolatus
- Salacia lehmbachii var. manus-lacertae
- Salacia lehmbachii var. pes-ranulae
- Salacia lehmbachii var. uregaensis

==== Dichapetalaceae ====
- Dichapetalum asplundeanum
- Dichapetalum bocageanum
- Dichapetalum costaricense
- Dichapetalum oliganthum
- Dichapetalum reticulatum
- Stephanopodium longipedicellatum
- Stephanopodium magnifolium
- Tapura arachnoidea
- Tapura carinata
- Tapura ivorensis
- Tapura letestui
- Tapura neglecta
- Tapura orbicularis

=== Cornales ===
Species

- Alangium circulare
- Alangium havilandii
- Alangium longiflorum
- Cornus disciflora
- Cornus monbeigii
- Diplopanax stachyanthus
- Mastixia glauca
- Mastixia macrocarpa
- Mastixia macrophylla
- Mastixia nimali
- Mastixia tetrandra
- Melanophylla madagascariensis

Varieties

- Davidia involucrata var. vilmoriniana

=== Cucurbitales ===
==== Anisophylleaceae ====
- Anisophyllea apetala
- Anisophyllea cabole
- Anisophyllea chartacea
- Anisophyllea cinnamomoides
- Anisophyllea curtisii
- Anisophyllea ferruginea
- Anisophyllea globosa
- Anisophyllea grandis
- Anisophyllea impressinervia
- Anisophyllea nitida
- Anisophyllea reticulata
- Anisophyllea rhomboidea
- Combretocarpus rotundatus

==== Begoniaceae ====
- Begonia adpressa
- Begonia aequatorialis
- Begonia bataiensis
- Begonia brandbygeana
- Begonia cavaleriei
- Begonia compacticaulis
- Begonia dentatobracteata
- Begonia dodsonii
- Begonia duncan-thomasii
- Begonia exalata
- Begonia geminiflora
- Begonia hemsleyana
- Begonia heterochroma
- Begonia holmnielseniana
- Begonia lugonis
- Begonia mbangaensis
- Begonia microsperma
- Begonia napoensis
- Begonia neoharlingii
- Begonia oellgaardii
- Begonia oxyanthera
- Begonia parcifolia
- Begonia pectennervia
- Begonia preussii
- Begonia secunda
- Begonia seychellensis
- Begonia sparreana
- Begonia tetrandra
- Begonia truncicola
- Begonia xerophyta
- Begonia ynesiae
- Begonia zenkeriana

==== Cucurbitaceae ====
- Cucurbita ecuadorensis
- Dendrosicyos socotranus, cucumber tree
- Eureiandra balfourii
- Momordica enneaphylla

=== Dilleniales ===
- Dillenia fischeri
- Dillenia luzoniensis
- Dillenia megalantha
- Dillenia philippinensis
- Dillenia reifferscheidtia
- Hibbertia emarginata
- Hibbertia heterotricha
- Hibbertia moratii
- Hibbertia rubescens

=== Dipsacales ===
- Dipsacus narcisseanus
- Heptacodium miconioides
- Sambucus tigranii, Tigran's elder
- Sinadoxa corydalifolia
- Valeriana buxifolia
- Valeriana cernua
- Valeriana coleophylla
- Viburnum arboreum
- Viburnum tridentatum

=== Ericales ===
==== Actinidiaceae ====
- Actinidia chrysantha
- Actinidia laevissima
- Actinidia pilosula
- Actinidia rudis
- Actinidia suberifolia
- Actinidia ulmifolia
- Actinidia vitifolia
- Saurauia bracteosa
- Saurauia cauliflora
- Saurauia erythrocarpa
- Saurauia harlingii
- Saurauia lanceolata
- Saurauia latipetala
- Saurauia leucocarpa
- Saurauia microphylla
- Saurauia oreophila
- Saurauia rubrisepala
- Saurauia villosa

==== Clethraceae ====
- Clethra javanica
- Clethra parallelinervia

==== Ebenaceae ====
- Diospyros acuminata
- Diospyros albiflora
- Diospyros amaniensis
- Diospyros atrata
- Diospyros barberi
- Diospyros barteri
- Diospyros blumutensis
- Diospyros boutoniana
- Diospyros candolleana
- Diospyros celebica, Indonesian ebony
- Diospyros chaetocarpa
- Diospyros cherrieri
- Diospyros conformis
- Diospyros crassiflora
- Diospyros daemona
- Diospyros fastidiosa
- Diospyros feliciana
- Diospyros gambleana
- Diospyros greenwayi
- Diospyros hirsuta
- Diospyros impolita
- Diospyros insidiosa
- Diospyros kingii
- Diospyros kupensis
- Diospyros leucomelas
- Diospyros margaretae
- Diospyros melanida
- Diospyros nebulosa
- Diospyros neraudii
- Diospyros oblongifolia
- Diospyros paniculata
- Diospyros perplexa
- Diospyros platanoides
- Diospyros pterocalyx
- Diospyros pustulata
- Diospyros quaesita
- Diospyros revaughanii
- Diospyros selangorensis
- Diospyros tero
- Diospyros tessellaria, black ebony
- Diospyros thwaitesii
- Diospyros trichophylla
- Diospyros trisulca
- Diospyros walkeri
- Euclea balfourii
- Euclea laurina

==== Ericaceae ====
Species

- Arbutus canariensis
- Arbutus pavarii
- Arctostaphylos catalinae
- Craibiodendron scleranthum
- Diplycosia pilosa
- Gaultheria nubigena
- Macleania loeseneriana
- Philippia nyassana
- Rhododendron album
- Rhododendron cyanocarpum
- Rhododendron jucundum, syn. of Rhododendron selense subsp. jucundum
- Rhododendron loerzingii
- Rhododendron subansiriense
- Rhododendron wattii
- Vaccinium bissei

Varieties

- Rhododendron dalhousiae var. rhabdotum

==== Lecythidaceae ====
Species

- Abdulmajidia chaniana
- Abdulmajidia maxwelliana
- Barringtonia payensiana
- Bertholletia excelsa, Brazil nut
- Cariniana integrifolia
- Cariniana legalis
- Corythophora labriculata
- Couratari calycina
- Couratari longipedicellata
- Couratari sandwithii
- Couratari scottmorii
- Couratari tauari
- Crateranthus talbotii
- Eschweilera alvimii
- Eschweilera amazonicaformis
- Eschweilera baguensis
- Eschweilera beebei
- Eschweilera bogotensis
- Eschweilera boltenii
- Eschweilera carinata
- Eschweilera fanshawei
- Eschweilera integricalyx
- Eschweilera mexicana
- Eschweilera rhododendrifolia
- Eschweilera rimbachii
- Eschweilera rionegrense
- Eschweilera rodriguesiana
- Eschweilera roraimensis
- Eschweilera sclerophylla
- Eschweilera squamata
- Eschweilera subcordata
- Eschweilera tetrapetala
- Eschweilera venezuelica
- Foetidia macrocarpa
- Grias colombiana
- Grias haughtii
- Grias multinervia
- Gustavia acuminata
- Gustavia erythrocarpa
- Gustavia foliosa
- Gustavia fosteri
- Gustavia pubescens
- Gustavia santanderiensis
- Gustavia sessilis
- Gustavia verticillata
- Lecythis barnebyi
- Lecythis brancoensis
- Lecythis parvifructa
- Lecythis schomburgkii
- Lecythis schwackei
- Napoleonaea egertonii

Subspecies

- Gustavia nana subsp. rhodantha
- Gustavia speciosa subsp. occidentalis

==== Myrsinaceae ====
- Ardisia alstonii
- Ardisia carchiana
- Ardisia flavida
- Ardisia furfuracella
- Ardisia jamaicensis
- Ardisia jefeana
- Ardisia martinensis
- Ardisia panamensis
- Ardisia premontana
- Ardisia squamulosa
- Ardisia subsessilifolia
- Ardisia urbanii
- Ardisia websteri
- Ardisia zakii
- Cybianthus cogolloi
- Elingamita johnsonii
- Embelia upembensis
- Geissanthus challuayacus
- Geissanthus ecuadorensis
- Heberdenia excelsa
- Myrsine bullata
- Myrsine degeneri
- Myrsine diazii
- Myrsine fosbergii
- Myrsine hosakae
- Myrsine oliveri
- Myrsine pearcei (Note: Listed by IUCN as Myrsine pearce.)
- Myrsine reynelii
- Myrsine rivularis
- Myrsine sodiroana
- Parathesis amplifolia
- Parathesis aurantica
- Parathesis congesta
- Parathesis palaciosii
- Pleiomeris canariensis
- Rapanea coclensis
- Rapanea gilliana
- Tapeinosperma campanula
- Wallenia elliptica
- Wallenia erythrocarpa
- Wallenia fawcettii
- Wallenia sylvestris
- Wallenia xylosteoides

==== Primulaceae ====
- Primula apennina
- Soldanella villosa

==== Sapotaceae ====
Species

- Aningeria pseudoracemosa
- Baillonella toxisperma, African pearwood
- Chrysophyllum acreanum
- Chrysophyllum albipilum
- Chrysophyllum pauciflorum
- Chrysophyllum revolutum
- Chrysophyllum splendens
- Delpydora macrophylla
- Ecclinusa lancifolia
- Ecclinusa orinocoensis
- Ecclinusa parviflora
- Gluema ivorensis
- Lecomtedoxa nogo
- Leptostylis multiflora
- Leptostylis petiolata
- Madhuca aristulata
- Madhuca betis
- Madhuca cheongiana
- Madhuca costulata
- Madhuca curtisii
- Madhuca endertii
- Madhuca fulva
- Madhuca glabrescens
- Madhuca hainanensis
- Madhuca hirtiflora
- Madhuca kuchingensis
- Madhuca lancifolia
- Madhuca longistyla
- Madhuca moonii
- Madhuca oblongifolia
- Madhuca obovatifolia
- Madhuca ochracea
- Madhuca palembanica
- Madhuca pasquieri
- Madhuca penicillata
- Madhuca ridleyi
- Madhuca rufa
- Madhuca sandakanensis
- Madhuca sessiliflora
- Manilkara bolivarensis
- Manilkara cavalcantei
- Manilkara excelsa
- Manilkara maxima
- Manilkara pleeana
- Manilkara pubicarpa
- Micropholis brochidodroma
- Micropholis compta
- Micropholis polita
- Micropholis resinifera
- Micropholis spectabilis
- Micropholis venamoensis
- Mimusops acutifolia
- Mimusops riparia
- Neohemsleya usambarensis
- Nesoluma polynesicum, island nesoluma
- Nesoluma st.-johnianum
- Northia hornei
- Palaquium bataanense
- Palaquium bourdillonii
- Palaquium grande
- Palaquium hispidum
- Palaquium impressionervium
- Palaquium luzoniense, red nato
- Palaquium maingayi
- Palaquium mindanaense
- Palaquium neoebudicum
- Palaquium pauciflorum
- Palaquium philippense
- Palaquium regina-montium
- Palaquium rubiginosum
- Palaquium thwaitesii
- Palaquium xanthochymum
- Palaquium zeylanicum
- Payena grandistipula
- Payena longipedicellata
- Pouteria amygdalina
- Pouteria arcuata
- Pouteria areolatifolia
- Pouteria arguacoensium
- Pouteria aristata
- Pouteria austin-smithii
- Pouteria bapeba
- Pouteria belizensis
- Pouteria benai
- Pouteria bonneriana
- Pouteria briocheoides
- Pouteria bullata
- Pouteria calistophylla
- Pouteria chiricana
- Pouteria collina
- Pouteria congestifolia
- Pouteria crassiflora
- Pouteria cubensis
- Pouteria filiformis
- Pouteria fossicola
- Pouteria foveolata
- Pouteria furcata
- Pouteria glauca
- Pouteria gracilis
- Pouteria kaieteurensis
- Pouteria krukovii
- Pouteria leptopedicellata
- Pouteria longifolia
- Pouteria lucens
- Pouteria macrocarpa
- Pouteria microstrigosa
- Pouteria nemorosa
- Pouteria nudipetala
- Pouteria oppositifolia
- Pouteria pachyphylla
- Pouteria penicillata
- Pouteria peruviensis
- Pouteria petiolata
- Pouteria pisquiensis
- Pouteria puberula
- Pouteria pubescens
- Pouteria putamen-ovi
- Pouteria rufotomentosa
- Pouteria semecarpifolia
- Pouteria sessilis
- Pouteria silvestris
- Pouteria sipapoensis
- Pouteria squamosa
- Pouteria stenophylla, synonym of Lucuma stenophylla
- Pouteria triplarifolia
- Pouteria vernicosa
- Pouteria villamilii, white nato
- Pradosia cuatrecasasii
- Pradosia granulosa
- Pradosia montana
- Pradosia subverticillata
- Pycnandra francei
- Pycnandra kaalaensis
- Sarcaulus inflexus
- Sarcaulus oblatus
- Sarcaulus vestitus
- Sarcaulus wurdackii
- Sideroxylon acunae
- Sideroxylon altamiranoi
- Sideroxylon anomalum
- Sideroxylon bullatum
- Sideroxylon confertum
- Sideroxylon dominicanum
- Sideroxylon durifolium
- Sideroxylon eucoriaceum
- Sideroxylon fimbriatum
- Sideroxylon hirtiantherum
- Sideroxylon ibarrae
- Sideroxylon jubilla
- Sideroxylon mirmulano
- Sideroxylon peninsulare
- Sideroxylon socorrense
- Sideroxylon spinosum
- Sideroxylon stevensonii
- Spiniluma discolor
- Synsepalum aubrevillei
- Synsepalum glycydora
- Synsepalum kassneri
- Vincentella densiflora, synonym of Synsepalum revolutum
- Vitellaria paradoxa, shea butter tree
- Vitellariopsis cuneata
- Vitellariopsis ferruginea
- Vitellariopsis kirkii

Subspecies

- Manilkara jaimiqui subsp. haitensis
- Manilkara jaimiqui subsp. jaimiqui
- Manilkara jaimiqui subsp. wrightiana
- Pouteria dictyoneura subsp. dictyoneura
- Sideroxylon floribundum subsp. belizense
- Sideroxylon floribundum subsp. floribundum
- Sideroxylon inerme subsp. cryptophlebia

Varieties

- Pouteria alnifolia var. sacleuxii

==== Sarraceniaceae ====
- Sarracenia leucophylla

==== Styracaceae ====
- Halesia macgregorii
- Huodendron parvifolium
- Pamphilia vilcabambae
- Pterostyrax psilophyllus, small epaulette tree
- Sinojackia dolichocarpa, Changiostyrax dolichocarpa
- Sinojackia xylocarpa
- Styrax argyrophyllus
- Styrax crotonoides
- Styrax ferax
- Styrax foveolaria
- Styrax fraserensis
- Styrax litseoides
- Styrax mathewsii
- Styrax peruvianum
- Styrax socialis
- Styrax tafelbergensis

==== Symplocaceae ====
Species

- Symplocos baehnii
- Symplocos bractealis
- Symplocos buxifolioides
- Symplocos calycodactylos
- Symplocos canescens
- Symplocos chloroleuca
- Symplocos clethrifolia
- Symplocos coccinea
- Symplocos cordifolia
- Symplocos costata
- Symplocos fuscata
- Symplocos hispidula
- Symplocos lugubris
- Symplocos mezii
- Symplocos peruviana
- Symplocos rimbachii
- Symplocos subandina
- Symplocos tacanensis
- Symplocos trichoclada
- Symplocos tubulifera
- Symplocos verrucisurcula

Subspecies

- Symplocos macrocarpa subsp. kanarana

Varieties

- Symplocos coronata var. coronata
- Symplocos coronata var. glabrifolia
- Symplocos cuneata var. acuta
- Symplocos cuneata var. cuneata

==== Theaceae ====
Species

- Adinandra corneriana
- Apterosperma oblata
- Balthasaria mannii
- Camellia chrysantha
- Camellia crapnelliana, Crapnell's camellia
- Camellia euphlebia
- Camellia flavida
- Camellia fleuryi
- Camellia formosensis
- Camellia gilbertii
- Camellia granthamiana, Grantham's camellia
- Camellia mileensis
- Camellia pleurocarpa
- Camellia pubipetala
- Camellia renshanxiangiae
- Camellia reticulata
- Camellia stuartiana
- Camellia szemaoensis
- Camellia transarisanensis
- Camellia trichoclada
- Cleyera bolleana
- Cleyera vaccinioides
- Eurya sandwicensis
- Freziera alata
- Freziera angulosa
- Freziera biserrata
- Freziera caesariata
- Freziera caloneura
- Freziera campanulata
- Freziera ciliata
- Freziera cordata
- Freziera echinata
- Freziera ferruginea
- Freziera glabrescens
- Freziera incana
- Freziera jaramilloi
- Freziera minima
- Freziera obovata
- Freziera parva
- Freziera punctata
- Freziera retinveria
- Freziera rufescens
- Freziera sessiliflora
- Freziera suberosa
- Freziera uncinata
- Freziera velutina
- Gordonia penangensis
- Gordonia singaporeana
- Polyspora hirtella
- Polyspora maingayi
- Polyspora multinervis
- Polyspora scortechinii
- Polyspora taipingensis
- Ternstroemia corneri
- Ternstroemia howardiana
- Ternstroemia penangiana
- Ternstroemia polypetala

Varieties

- Anneslea fragrans var. lanceolata
- Camellia indochinensis var. tunghinensis
- Pyrenaria serrata var. kunstleri
- Schima wallichii var. pulgarensis

==== Theophrastaceae ====
Species

- Clavija jelskii
- Clavija pungens
- Clavija repanda
- Clavija subandina
- Jacquinia proctorii, wash wood

Varieties

- Jacquinia macrantha var. macrantha

==== Other Ericales species ====
- Marcgraviastrum gigantophyllum
- Pelliciera rhizophorae
- Rhaptopetalum sindarense

=== Fabales ===
==== Fabaceae ====
Species

- Abarema abbottii
- Abarema bigemina
- Abarema callejasii
- Abarema centiflora
- Abarema filamentosa
- Abarema ganymedea
- Abarema josephi
- Abarema killipii
- Abarema lehmannii
- Abarema obovata
- Abarema oxyphyllidia
- Abarema racemiflora
- Abarema turbinata
- Acacia ankokib
- Acacia aphylla
- Acacia auratiflora
- Acacia campbellii
- Acacia clandullensis
- Acacia dallachiana
- Acacia densispina
- Acacia epacantha
- Acacia etilis
- Acacia ferruginea
- Acacia flagellaris
- Acacia howittii
- Acacia koaia
- Acacia latispina
- Acacia manubensis
- Acacia octonervia
- Acacia prasinata
- Acacia pseudonigrescens
- Acacia symonii
- Acacia tetraneura
- Acacia vassalii
- Acacia venosa
- Acacia villosa
- Acacia wetarensis
- Acaciella rosei
- Adenanthera bicolor
- Adenanthera intermedia
- Adenopodia rotundifolia
- Adesmia cordobensis
- Aeschynomene schindleri
- Afzelia africana, afzelia
- Afzelia bipindensis
- Afzelia pachyloba, white afzelia
- Afzelia rhomboidea
- Albizia berteriana
- Albizia buntingii
- Albizia burkartiana
- Albizia carrii
- Albizia edwarllii
- Albizia ferruginea, albizia
- Albizia guillainii
- Albizia leonardii
- Albizia obbiadensis
- Almaleea capitata, slender parrot-pea
- Amburana acreana
- Amorpha ouachitensis, Ouachita false indigo
- Andira galeottiana
- Angylocalyx braunii
- Angylocalyx talbotii
- Anthonotha lebrunii
- Anthonotha nigerica
- Anthonotha obanensis
- Anthonotha vignei
- Arachis cruziana
- Arapatiella psilophylla
- Archidendron forbesii
- Archidendron oblongum
- Archidendropsis glandulosa
- Archidendropsis lentiscifolia
- Archidendropsis paivana
- Astracantha atenica, Atenian astracantha
- Astragalus aspindzicus, Aspindzian astragalus
- Astragalus hirtulus
- Astragalus holophyllus, entire-leaved milk vetch
- Astragalus leucolobus, Big Bear Valley woollypod
- Astragalus setosulus
- Astragalus shagalensis, Shagalian milk vetch
- Astragalus sprucei
- Astragalus tanaiticus
- Ateleia salicifolia
- Baphia abyssinica
- Baphia breteleriana
- Baphia dewildeana
- Baphia heudelotiana
- Baphia keniensis
- Baphia kirkii
- Baphia latiloi
- Baphia macrocalyx
- Baphia semseiana
- Bauhinia augusti
- Bauhinia bowkeri
- Bauhinia loeseneriana
- Bauhinia pichinchensis
- Belairia parvifolia
- Berlinia occidentalis
- Berlinia orientalis
- Bossiaea oxyclada
- Brachystegia angustistipulata
- Brachystegia bakeriana
- Brachystegia kennedyi
- Brachystegia nigerica
- Browneopsis excelsa
- Bussea xylocarpa
- Cadia pedicellata
- Caesalpinia nhatrangense
- Caesalpinia paraguariensis
- Calliandra comosa
- Calliandra decrescens
- Calliandra paniculata
- Calliandra pilosa
- Calliandra tumbeziana
- Calpocalyx atlanticus
- Calpocalyx brevifolius
- Calpocalyx cauliflorus
- Calpocalyx heitzii
- Calpocalyx klainei
- Calpocalyx letestui
- Calpocalyx ngouiensis
- Canavalia hawaiiensis, Hawaiian jackbean
- Cassia aldabrensis
- Cassia aubrevillei
- Centrolobium yavizanum
- Chadsia magnifica
- Chamaecrista bucherae
- Chamaecrista caribaea
- Chamaecrista lomatopoda
- Chamaecrista onusta
- Chloroleucon chacoense
- Chloroleucon eurycyclum
- Chloroleucon extortum
- Chordospartium stevensonii, weeping tree broom
- Clitoria moyobambensis
- Clitoria woytkowskii
- Copaifera epunctata
- Copaifera panamensis
- Copaifera salikounda
- Cordeauxia edulis
- Cordyla densiflora
- Cordyla haraka
- Cordyla richardii
- Coursetia brachyrhachis
- Coursetia gracilis
- Craibia atlantica
- Cratylia bahiensis
- Crotalaria exilipes
- Crotalaria jacksonii
- Crotalaria ledermannii
- Crotalaria schliebenii
- Crotalaria socotrana
- Crudia balachandrae
- Crudia brevipes
- Crudia lanceolata
- Crudia penduliflora
- Crudia scortechinii
- Crudia splendens
- Cryptosepalum tetraphyllum
- Cyclopia bolusii
- Cynometra brachyrrhachis
- Cynometra engleri
- Cynometra inaequifolia
- Cynometra longipedicellata
- Cynometra suaheliensis
- Cynometra webberi
- Dalbergia acariiantha
- Dalbergia aurea
- Dalbergia balansae
- Dalbergia baronii
- Dalbergia catipenonii
- Dalbergia chlorocarpa
- Dalbergia cochinchinensis, Siamese rosewood
- Dalbergia glaberrima
- Dalbergia glomerata
- Dalbergia hildebrandtii
- Dalbergia latifolia, Bombay blackwood
- Dalbergia lemurica
- Dalbergia madagascariensis
- Dalbergia monticola
- Dalbergia neoperrieri
- Dalbergia nigra, Bahia rosewood
- Dalbergia odorifera
- Dalbergia orientalis
- Dalbergia pseudobaronii
- Dalbergia purpurascens
- Dalbergia retusa
- Dalbergia simpsonii
- Dalbergia tonkinensis
- Dalbergia tricolor
- Dalbergia vacciniifolia
- Dalbergia viguieri
- Dalea jamesonii
- Daniellia oblonga
- Delonix decaryi
- Dialium holtzii
- Dichrostachys dehiscens
- Dicraeopetalum capuroniana
- Dicraeopetalum mahafaliensis
- Dicraeopetalum stipulare
- Dipteryx alata
- Dipteryx charapilla
- Dussia foxii
- Eleiotis rottleri
- Englerodendron usambarense
- Eriosema letouzeyi
- Erythrina elenae
- Erythrina euodiphylla
- Erythrina haerdii
- Erythrina hazomboay
- Erythrina polychaeta
- Erythrina tuxtlana
- Eurypetalum unijugum
- Fordia incredibilis
- Fordia lanceolata
- Fordia ophirensis
- Fordia pauciflora
- Genista benehoavensis
- Genista tetragona
- Gilbertiodendron bilineatum
- Gilbertiodendron klainei
- Gilbertiodendron pachyanthum
- Gilbertiodendron robynsianum
- Gilbertiodendron splendidum
- Gilletiodendron glandulosum
- Gleditsia assamica
- Gossweilerodendron joveri
- Guibourtia schliebenii
- Hammatolobium kremerianum
- Haplormosia monophylla
- Harpalyce maisiana
- Humboldtia laurifolia
- Hydrochorea acreana
- Hymenaea torrei
- Hymenostegia bakeriana
- Indigofera dasycephala
- Indigofera imerinensis
- Indigofera rothii
- Indigofera sokotrana
- Inga allenii
- Inga amboroensis
- Inga andersonii
- Inga approximata
- Inga aptera
- Inga augusti
- Inga balsapambensis
- Inga bicoloriflora
- Inga bijuga
- Inga bollandii
- Inga bullata
- Inga bullatorugosa
- Inga calantha
- Inga calanthoides
- Inga calcicola
- Inga canonegrensis
- Inga caudata
- Inga chiapensis
- Inga coragypsea
- Inga cuspidata
- Inga cynometrifolia
- Inga dominicensis
- Inga dwyeri
- Inga exilis
- Inga extra-nodis
- Inga fosteriana
- Inga gereauana
- Inga grazielae
- Inga hispida
- Inga interfluminensis
- Inga ismaelis
- Inga lenticellata
- Inga lentiscifolia
- Inga leptantha
- Inga leptingoides
- Inga macarenensis
- Inga macrantha
- Inga martinicensis
- Inga microcalyx
- Inga mucuna
- Inga neblinensis
- Inga pallida
- Inga pauciflora
- Inga pleiogyna
- Inga pluricarpellata
- Inga portobellensis
- Inga praegnans
- Inga saffordiana
- Inga salicifoliola
- Inga saltensis
- Inga santaremnensis
- Inga silanchensis
- Inga skutchii
- Inga spiralis
- Inga suborbicularis
- Inga tenuicalyx
- Inga unica
- Inga xinguensis
- Inga yasuniana
- Intsia acuminata
- Isoberlinia scheffleri
- Jacqueshuberia loretensis
- Julbernardia magnistipulata
- Kalappia celebica
- Koompassia grandiflora
- Kotschya micrantha
- Kotschya platyphylla
- Lecointea ovalifolia
- Lennea viridiflora
- Leptoderris aurantiaca
- Leucaena cuspidata
- Leucaena greggii
- Leucaena lempirana
- Leucaena pueblana
- Leucochloron foederale
- Leucostegane latistipulata
- Loesenera kalantha
- Loesenera talbotii
- Lonchocarpus calcaratus
- Lonchocarpus chiricanus
- Lonchocarpus santarosanus
- Lotononis rigida
- Lotus mollis
- Lupinus macbrideanus
- Machaerium chambersii
- Machaerium cuzcoense
- Machaerium glabripes
- Machaerium villosum
- Macrolobium amplexans
- Macrolobium stenopetalum
- Macrolobium taylorii
- Macrosamanea macrocalyx
- Macrosamanea prancei
- Medicago kotovii
- Michelsonia microphylla
- Micklethwaitia carvalhoi
- Microberlinia brazzavillensis, zebrawood
- Millettia bussei
- Millettia capuronii
- Millettia decipiens
- Millettia elongatistyla
- Millettia eriocarpa
- Millettia galliflagrans
- Millettia lacus-alberti
- Millettia limbutuensis
- Millettia pilosa
- Millettia pterocarpa
- Millettia sacleuxii
- Millettia schliebenii
- Millettia semseii
- Millettia sericantha
- Millettia unifoliata
- Millettia warneckei
- Mimosa andina
- Mimosa domingensis
- Mimosa nothacacia
- Monopetalanthus compactus
- Monopetalanthus durandii
- Mora ekmanii
- Mora oleifera
- Neoharmsia madagascariensis
- Newtonia paucijuga
- Ormocarpopsis mandrarensis
- Ormocarpopsis parvifolia
- Ormocarpum dhofarense
- Ormosia grandistipulata
- Ormosia polita
- Oxystigma msoo
- Paramachaerium schunkei
- Parkia korom
- Parkia parvifoliola
- Pericopsis mooniana, Nandu wood
- Phylloxylon spinosa
- Phylloxylon xylophylloides
- Piptadenia weberbaueri
- Pithecellobium gracile
- Pithecellobium grisebachianum
- Pithecellobium pithecolobioides
- Plathymenia foliolosa
- Platymiscium gracile
- Platysepalum inopinatum
- Poecilanthe ovalifolia
- Poissonia hypoleuca
- Pongamia velutina
- Pongamiopsis viguieri
- Prosopis abbreviata
- Pseudosamanea cubana
- Pseudovigna sulaensis
- Pterocarpus indicus, Amboyna wood
- Pterocarpus marsupium, East Indian/Malabar kino
- Pultenaea brachytropis
- Pultenaea pinifolia, tree pultenaea
- Pultenaea whiteana, Mount Barney bush pea
- Rhynchosia androyensis
- Rhynchosia baukea
- Rhynchosia heynei
- Saraca asoca
- Sclerolobium striatum, synonym of Tachigali pilgeriana
- Senna domingensis
- Senna multifoliolata
- Serianthes calycina
- Serianthes margaretae
- Serianthes myriadenia
- Serianthes vitiensis
- Sesbania speciosa
- Sindora inermis
- Sindora javanica
- Sindora supa
- Sophora fernandeziana
- Sophora masafuerana
- Sphaerolobium pubescens
- Steinbachiella leptoclada
- Storckiella vitiensis
- Stryphnodendron harbesonii
- Stuhlmannia moavi
- Swainsona murrayana, slender darling-pea
- Swartzia haughtii
- Swartzia rediviva
- Swartzia santanderensis
- Sylvichadsia grandifolia
- Sympetalandra schmutzii
- Taverniera sericophylla
- Tephrosia genistoides
- Tephrosia parvifolia
- Tephrosia pondoensis
- Tephrosia socotrana
- Tetraberlinia tubmaniana
- Umtiza listeriana
- Vachellia antunesii
- Vachellia bavazzanoi
- Xanthocercis madagascariensis
- Xanthocercis rabiensis
- Zenkerella egregia
- Zenkerella perplexa
- Zygia biflora
- Zygia lehmannii
- Zygia oriunda

Subspecies

- Albizia tanganyicensis subsp. adamsoniorum
- Astragalus stevenianus subsp. meskheticus, Meskhetian astragalus
- Baphia incerta subsp. lebrunii
- Baphia leptostemma subsp. leptostemma
- Baphia marceliana subsp. marquesii
- Baphia punctulata subsp. punctulata
- Ceratonia oreothauma subsp. oreothauma
- Craibia brevicaudata subsp. schliebenii
- Dalbergia albiflora subsp. echinocarpa
- Delonix leucantha subsp. bemarahensis
- Delonix leucantha subsp. leucantha
- Indigofera patula subsp. okuensis
- Inga subnuda subsp. subnuda
- Kotschya recurvifolia subsp. longifolia
- Millettia impressa subsp. goetzeana
- Millettia oblata subsp. intermedia
- Millettia oblata subsp. oblata
- Millettia oblata subsp. stolzii
- Millettia oblata subsp. teitensis
- Ormocarpum sennoides subsp. zanzibaricum
- Pterocarpus mildbraedii subsp. usambarensis, white padouk
- Sakoanala villosa subsp. menabeensis
- Senna multijuga subsp. doylei
- Zenkerella capparidacea subsp. capparidacea
- Zenkerella capparidacea subsp. grotei

Varieties

- Abarema cochleata var. moniliformis
- Abarema curvicarpa var. rodriguesii
- Abarema leucophylla var. vaupesensis
- Albizia malacophylla var. malacophylla
- Albizia multiflora var. sagasteguii
- Baphia leptostemma var. conraui
- Dalbergia fusca var. enneandra
- Geoffroea decorticans var. subtropicalis
- Leucaena confertiflora var. confertiflora
- Maniltoa schefferi var. peekelii
- Millettia usaramensis var. parvifolia
- Senna dariensis var. hypoglauca
- Serianthes melanesica var. meeboldii
- Tessmannia martiniana var. martiniana

==== Polygalaceae ====
Species

- Monnina equatoriensis
- Monnina loxensis
- Monnina obovata
- Monnina pseudoaestuans
- Polygala kuriensis
- Securidaca leiocarpa
- Xanthophyllum bullatum
- Xanthophyllum sulphureum

Subspecies

- Polygala tenuicaulis subsp. tenuicaulis

=== Fagales ===
==== Betulaceae ====
- Corylus colchica, Colchian hazel
- Ostryopsis intermedia
- Ostryopsis nobilis, Yunnan tiger hazel

==== Fagaceae ====
Species

- Castanopsis concinna
- Castanopsis dongchoensis
- Castanopsis endertii
- Castanopsis longipetiolata
- Castanopsis malaccensis
- Castanopsis ninhhoensis
- Castanopsis oligoneura
- Castanopsis scortechinii
- Castanopsis tessellata
- Castanopsis wallichii
- Fagus hayatae
- Fagus longipetiolata
- Lithocarpus andersonii
- Lithocarpus auriculatus
- Lithocarpus burkillii
- Lithocarpus curtisii
- Lithocarpus eichleri
- Lithocarpus elephantum
- Lithocarpus erythrocarpus
- Lithocarpus glutinosus
- Lithocarpus hendersonianus
- Lithocarpus jacobsii
- Lithocarpus jordanae
- Lithocarpus kingii, synonym of Lithocarpus perakensis
- Lithocarpus maingayi
- Lithocarpus mariae
- Lithocarpus menadoensis
- Lithocarpus monticola
- Lithocarpus pachylepis
- Lithocarpus pattaniensis
- Lithocarpus porcatus
- Lithocarpus pseudosundaicus
- Lithocarpus pulongtauensis
- Lithocarpus robinsonii
- Lithocarpus sandakanensis
- Lithocarpus scortechinii
- Lithocarpus suffruticosus
- Lithocarpus tawaiensis
- Lithocarpus vinkii
- Lithocarpus woodii
- Quercus acutifolia
- Quercus afares
- Quercus ajoensis
- Quercus arkansana, Arkansas oak
- Quercus austrina
- Quercus austrocochinchinensis
- Quercus braianensis
- Quercus cedrosensis, Cedros Island oak
- Quercus costaricensis
- Quercus furfuracea
- Quercus gaharuensis
- Quercus gulielmi-treleasei
- Quercus hintoniorum
- Quercus hondae
- Quercus kerangasensis
- Quercus litseoides
- Quercus merrillii
- Quercus quangtriensis
- Quercus repandifolia
- Quercus rubramenta
- Quercus treubiana
- Quercus tuitensis
- Quercus vicentensis

Subspecies

- Quercus robur subsp. imeretina

==== Juglandaceae ====
- Alfaroa hondurensis
- Carya palmeri
- Engelhardia danumensis
- Engelhardia kinabaluensis
- Engelhardia mendalomensis
- Juglans insularis
- Juglans jamaicensis, West Indian walnut
- Pterocarya fraxinifolia
- Pterocarya hupehensis
- Pterocarya macroptera
- Pterocarya tonkinensis
- Rhoiptelea chiliantha

==== Myricaceae ====
- Myrica arborea
- Myrica funckii
- Myrica pavonis

==== Nothofagaceae ====
- Nothofagus crenata
- Nothofagus cunninghamii
- Nothofagus glauca
- Nothofagus macrocarpa
- Nothofagus moorei

==== Ticodendraceae ====
- Ticodendron incognitum

=== Garryales ===
- Eucommia ulmoides
- Garrya salicifolia

=== Gentianales ===
==== Apocynaceae ====
- Alafia whytei
- Allomarkgrafia ecuatoriana
- Alstonia beatricis
- Alstonia breviloba
- Alstonia henryi, synonym of Alstonia sebusii
- Alstonia penangiana
- Alstonia rubiginosa
- Aspidosperma curranii
- Callichilia monopodialis
- Cerberiopsis obtusifolia
- Dictyophleba setosa
- Dyera polyphylla
- Isonema bucholzii
- Kibatalia elmeri
- Kibatalia gitingensis
- Kibatalia macgregori
- Kibatalia merrilliana
- Kibatalia villosa
- Kibatalia wigmani
- Kopsia lancifolia
- Kopsia singapurensis, (Note: Listed by IUCN as Kopsia singaporensis.) white kopsia
- Kopsia sleesiana
- Kopsia tenuis
- Landolphia flavidiflora
- Landolphia maxima
- Malouetia isthmica, synonym of Malouetia quadricasarum
- Melodinus axillaris
- Melodinus yunnanensis
- Neisosperma brevituba
- Ochrosia grandiflora
- Pachypodium brevicaule
- Pleioceras orientale
- Pleioceras zenkeri
- Pteralyxia macrocarpa, ridged pteralyxia
- Stemmadenia pauli
- Strempeliopsis arborea
- Tabernaemontana antheonycta
- Tabernaemontana cordata
- Tabernaemontana hallei
- Tabernaemontana ochroleuca
- Tabernaemontana oppositifolia
- Tabernaemontana remota
- Willughbeia cirrhifera
- Wrightia lanceolata
- Wrightia lecomtei
- Wrightia viridiflora

==== Asclepiadaceae ====
- Belostemma yunnanense
- Biondia chinensis
- Brachystelma omissum
- Ceropegia rhynchantha
- Cosmostigma hainanense
- Cryptolepis macrophylla
- Cryptolepis socotrana
- Cynanchum anderssonii
- Cynanchum bifidum
- Cynanchum chimboracense
- Cynanchum ellemannii
- Cynanchum erikseniae
- Cynanchum fasciculiflorum
- Cynanchum harlingii
- Cynanchum longecalicinum
- Cynanchum nielsenii
- Cynanchum quitense
- Cynanchum stenospira
- Cynanchum taihangense
- Ditassa anderssonii
- Dolichopetalum kwangsiense
- Echidnopsis bentii
- Echidnopsis inconspicua
- Echidnopsis insularis
- Echidnopsis milleri
- Echidnopsis socotrana
- Gonolobus saraguranus
- Hoya pandurata
- Marsdenia magniflora
- Marsdenia robusta, synonym of Stephanotis arabica
- Matelea harlingii
- Matelea pastazana
- Matelea porphyrocephala
- Pentarrhinum ledermannii
- Secamone cuneifolia
- Secamone letouzeana
- Secamone racemosa
- Socotrella dolichocnema
- Tylophora urceolata, synonym of Vincetoxicum anomalum
- Vincetoxicum pannonicum

==== Gentianaceae ====
- Centaurium somedanum
- Exacum caeruleum
- Gentianella bohemica
- Gentianella crassulifolia
- Gentianella fastigiata
- Gentianella gilioides
- Gentianella hypericoides
- Gentianella hyssopifolia
- Gentianella oellgaardii
- Gentianella profusa
- Gentianella saxifragoides
- Gentianella sulphurea
- Macrocarpaea harlingii
- Macrocarpaea thamnoides

==== Loganiaceae ====
Species

- Anthocleista microphylla
- Anthocleista scandens
- Geniostoma umbellatum
- Neuburgia tubiflora
- Strychnos benthami
- Strychnos elaeocarpa
- Strychnos millepunctata
- Strychnos staudtii

Varieties

- Geniostoma rupestre var. rouffaeranum

==== Rubiaceae ====
Species

- Afrocanthium keniense
- Afrocanthium kilifiense
- Afrocanthium shabanii
- Afrocanthium siebenlistii
- Afrocanthium vollesenii
- Alleizettella rubra
- Allenanthus hondurensis
- Aoranthe penduliflora
- Atractocarpus platyxylon
- Aulacocalyx divergens
- Aulacocalyx mapiana
- Aulacocalyx pallens
- Belonophora talbotii
- Bertiera pauloi
- Bobea sandwicensis
- Breonia lowryi
- Bullockia impressinervia
- Byrsophyllum ellipticum
- Calochone acuminata
- Calycosiphonia macrochlamys
- Canthium carinatum
- Chassalia albiflora
- Chassalia petitiana
- Chazaliella obanensis
- Cinchona lucumifolia
- Cinchona pyrifolia
- Coffea costatifructa
- Coffea fadenii
- Coffea macrocarpa
- Coffea mongensis
- Coffea pocsii
- Coffea pseudozanguebariae
- Coffea schliebenii
- Coffea togoensis
- Coffea zanguebariae, Ibo coffee
- Condaminea glabrata
- Condaminea microcarpa
- Coprosma oliveri
- Coprosma pyrifolia
- Coprosma wallii
- Coussarea mexicana
- Craterispermum longipedunculatum
- Craterispermum montanum
- Cuviera migeodii
- Cuviera talbotii
- Cuviera tomentosa
- Cyclophyllum tenuipes
- Elaeagia ecuadorensis
- Elaeagia pastoensis
- Empogona acidophylla
- Empogona africana
- Empogona concolor
- Empogona talbotii
- Erithalis quadrangularis
- Exostema triflorum
- Faramea exemplaris
- Gaertnera cardiocarpa
- Gaertnera darcyana
- Gaertnera drakeana
- Gaertnera rosea
- Gaertnera walkeri
- Gaillonia putorioides
- Galium azuayicum
- Galium cracoviense
- Galium sudeticum
- Gardenia hillii
- Gardenia remyi, Remy's gardenia
- Gardenia transvenulosa
- Gonzalagunia pauciflora
- Guettarda comata
- Guettarda frangulifolia
- Guettarda noumeana
- Hamelia papillosa
- Hymenocoleus glaber
- Ixora albersii
- Ixora foliosa
- Ixora jucunda
- Ixora malabarica
- Ixora margaretae
- Ixora nigerica
- Joosia longisepala
- Joosia macrocalyx
- Joosia oligantha
- Kadua cordata
- Keetia koritschoneri
- Keetia purpurascens
- Kotchubaea montana
- Kraussia socotrana
- Kraussia speciosa
- Ladenbergia acutifolia
- Ladenbergia ferruginea
- Ladenbergia gavanensis
- Ladenbergia stenocarpa
- Ladenbergia ulei
- Lasianthus ciliatus
- Lasianthus gardneri
- Lasianthus grandifolius
- Lasianthus pedunculatus
- Lasianthus rostratus
- Lasianthus wallacei
- Litosanthes capitulatus
- Macrocnemum cinchonoides
- Macrocnemum pilosinervium
- Mastixiodendron stoddardii
- Mitragyna ledermannii
- Mitragyna stipulosa
- Morinda asteroscepa
- Mouretia tonkinensis
- Multidentia castaneae
- Multidentia sclerocarpa
- Nargedia macrocarpa
- Nauclea diderrichii
- Ochreinauclea missionis
- Oldenlandia ocellata
- Oxyanthus montanus
- Palicourea anderssoniana
- Palicourea anianguana
- Palicourea asplundii
- Palicourea azurea
- Palicourea calantha
- Palicourea calothyrsus
- Palicourea calycina
- Palicourea canarina
- Palicourea candida
- Palicourea consobrina
- Palicourea corniculata
- Palicourea cornigera
- Palicourea gentryi
- Palicourea herrerae
- Palicourea jaramilloi
- Palicourea latifolia
- Palicourea lobbii
- Palicourea prodiga
- Palicourea sodiroi
- Palicourea tectoneura
- Palicourea wilesii
- Pauridiantha divaricata
- Pauridiantha insularis
- Pauridiantha venusta
- Pavetta axillipara
- Pavetta holstii
- Pavetta intermedia
- Pavetta lasioclada
- Pavetta linearifolia
- Pavetta lynesii
- Pavetta manyanguensis
- Pavetta mollissima
- Pavetta monticola
- Pavetta nitidissima
- Pavetta sparsipila
- Pavetta tarennoides
- Phyllopentas ledermannii
- Polysphaeria macrantha
- Portlandia harrisii
- Prismatomeris khoonmengiana
- Pseudosabicea batesii
- Pseudosabicea medusula
- Pseudosabicea pedicellata
- Psychotria alsophila
- Psychotria camerunensis
- Psychotria cathetoneura
- Psychotria crassipetala
- Psychotria cyathicalyx
- Psychotria dasyophthalma
- Psychotria deverdiana
- Psychotria domatiata
- Psychotria dubia
- Psychotria elachistantha
- Psychotria foetens
- Psychotria fusiformis
- Psychotria greenwelliae
- Psychotria guerkeana
- Psychotria hierniana
- Psychotria lanceifolia
- Psychotria lepiniana
- Psychotria megalopus
- Psychotria megistantha
- Psychotria pervillei
- Psychotria peteri
- Psychotria petitii
- Psychotria plicata
- Psychotria podocarpa
- Psychotria pseudoplatyphylla
- Psychotria stenophylla
- Psychotria taitensis
- Psychotria waasii
- Psychotria woytkowskii
- Psydrax dicoccos
- Psydrax faulknerae
- Psydrax kibuwae
- Psydrax micans
- Psydrax montanum
- Psydrax paradoxa
- Psydrax suborbicularis
- Pyrostria socotrana
- Randia pancheriana
- Razafimandimbisonia orientalis
- Rhipidantha chlorantha
- Robynsia glabrata
- Rondeletia adamsii
- Rondeletia elegans
- Rondeletia hirsuta
- Rondeletia hirta
- Rondeletia pallida
- Rondeletia peruviana
- Rondeletia portlandensis
- Rondeletia racemosa
- Rondeletia roynaefolia
- Rondeletia subsessilifolia
- Rothmannia macrosiphon
- Rudgea crassifolia
- Rudgea microcarpa
- Rudgea obesiflora
- Rudgea stenophylla
- Rustia alba
- Rustia viridiflora
- Rutidea nigerica
- Rytigynia binata
- Rytigynia caudatissima
- Rytigynia eickii
- Rytigynia hirsutiflora
- Rytigynia nodulosa
- Rytigynia pseudolongicaudata
- Sabicea pyramidalis
- Saprosma fragrans
- Schradera campii
- Schumanniophyton problematicum
- Simira wurdackii
- Stenostomum portoricense
- Stenostomum sintenisii
- Tarenna drummondii
- Tarenna luhomeroensis
- Tarenna nilagirica
- Tarenna quadrangularis
- Temnocalyx nodulosa
- Tocoyena pittieri
- Tricalysia atherura
- Tricalysia obstetrix
- Tricalysia pedicellata
- Tricalysia schliebenii
- Trichostachys interrupta
- Urophyllum ellipticum
- Vangueria bicolor
- Vangueria induta
- Vangueria pallidiflora
- Vangueriopsis longiflora

Subspecies

- Aulacocalyx pallens subsp. pallens
- Canthium oligocarpum subsp. intermedium
- Coffea mufindiensis subsp. mufindiensis
- Heinsenia diervilleoides subsp. mufindiensis
- Ixora scheffleri subsp. scheffleri
- Lasianthus kilimandscharicus subsp. laxinervis
- Oxyanthus lepidus subsp. kigogoensis
- Oxyanthus pyriformis subsp. brevitubus
- Oxyanthus pyriformis subsp. tanganyikensis
- Pachystigma loranthifolium subsp. loranthifolium
- Pausinystalia lane-poolei subsp. lane-poolei
- Pavetta johnstonii subsp. breviloba
- Pavetta sphaerobotrys subsp. lanceisepala
- Pavetta sphaerobotrys subsp. sphaerobotrys
- Pavetta sphaerobotrys subsp. tanaica
- Rytigynia bugoyensis subsp. glabriflora
- Rytigynia lichenoxenos subsp. glabrituba
- Rytigynia lichenoxenos subsp. lichenoxenos
- Tricalysia coriacea subsp. angustifolia
- Vangueria randii subsp. vollesenii
- Vangueria rufescens subsp. angustiloba

Varieties

- Afrocanthium racemulosum var. nanguanum
- Canthium neilgherrense var. neilgherrense
- Empogona ovalifolia var. glabrata
- Empogona ovalifolia var. taylorii
- Mussaenda microdonta var. microdonta
- Mussaenda monticola var. glabrescens
- Mussaenda monticola var. monticola
- Pavetta abyssinica var. usambarica
- Pavetta comostyla var. matengoana
- Pavetta comostyla var. nyassica
- Pavetta kyimbilensis var. iringensis
- Pavetta kyimbilensis var. kyimbilensis
- Pavetta macrosepala var. macrosepala
- Pavetta macrosepala var. puberula
- Pavetta sepium var. massaica
- Pavetta sepium var. sepium
- Pavetta subumbellata var. subcoriacea
- Psychotria goetzei var. goetzei
- Psychotria goetzei var. platyphylla
- Randia aculeata var. jamaicensis
- Rytigynia adenodonta var. adenodonta
- Rytigynia adenodonta var. reticulata
- Rytigynia celastroides var. nuda
- Sericanthe odoratissima var. odoratissima
- Sericanthe odoratissima var. ulugurensis
- Tricalysia anomala var. anomala
- Tricalysia anomala var. montana
- Vangueria volkensii var. kyimbilensis

=== Geraniales ===
Species

- Biophytum heinrichsae
- Dirachma socotrana
- Erodium rupicola
- Geranium chimborazense
- Geranium ecuadoriense
- Geranium guamanense
- Geranium holm-nielsenii
- Geranium loxense
- Geranium sericeum
- Impatiens flammea
- Impatiens morsei
- Impatiens sakeriana
- Oxalis dines
- Oxalis rufescens
- Sarcotheca ochracea
- Tropaeolum asplundii
- Tropaeolum brideanum
- Tropaeolum huigrense
- Tropaeolum leonis
- Tropaeolum magnificum
- Tropaeolum papillosum

Subspecies

- Impatiens hydrogetonoides subsp. kituloensis

Varieties

- Sarcotheca laxa var. brigittae
- Sarcotheca laxa var. hirsuta
- Sarcotheca laxa var. laxa
- Sarcotheca laxa var. sericea

=== Gunnerales ===
- Gunnera aequatoriensis

=== Hamamelidales ===
Species

- Chunia bucklandioides
- Embolanthera spicata
- Loropetalum subcordatum
- Maingaya malayana
- Matudaea trinervia
- Trichocladus goetzei

Varieties

- Liquidambar orientalis var. integriloba
- Liquidambar orientalis var. orientalis

=== Icacinales ===
- Casimirella guaranitica
- Cassinopsis chapelieri
- Cassinopsis ciliata
- Chlamydocarya soyauxii
- Mappia multiflora
- Pyrenacantha longirostrata
- Vadensea testui

=== Lamiales ===
==== Acanthaceae ====
Species

- Acanthopale decempedalis
- Acanthus kulalensis
- Acanthus latisepalus
- Afrofittonia silvestris
- Anisotes galanae
- Aphelandra albinotata
- Aphelandra anderssonii
- Aphelandra attenuata
- Aphelandra chrysantha
- Aphelandra dodsonii
- Aphelandra gunnari
- Aphelandra zamorensis
- Asystasia glandulifera
- Asystasia lindauiana
- Asystasia minutiflora
- Barleria aenea
- Barleria athiensis
- Barleria bornuensis
- Barleria griseoviridis
- Barleria lukwangulensis
- Barleria maritima
- Barleria mpandensis
- Barleria rhynchocarpa
- Barleria richardsiae
- Barleria scandens
- Barleria splendens
- Barleria subregularis
- Barleria tetracantha
- Blepharis chrysotricha
- Blepharis dhofarensis
- Blepharis petraea
- Blepharis pratensis
- Blepharis spiculifolia
- Blepharis turkanae
- Blepharis uzondoensis
- Brachystephanus giganteus
- Brachystephanus glaberrimus
- Brachystephanus longiflorus
- Brachystephanus oreacanthus
- Brillantaisia lancifolia
- Chorisochora minor
- Chorisochora striata
- Crossandra friesiorum
- Dicliptera alternans
- Dicliptera inconspicua
- Dicliptera latibracteata
- Dicliptera nilotica
- Dicliptera pilosa
- Dicliptera silvestris
- Duosperma dichotomum
- Duosperma livingstoniense
- Duosperma subquadrangulare
- Dyschoriste sallyae
- Dyschoriste subquadrangularis
- Ecbolium tanzaniense
- Echinacanthus lofuensis
- Echinacanthus longipes
- Eranthemum austrosinensis
- Gymnostachyum kwangsiense
- Hypoestes potamophila
- Isoglossa dispersa
- Isoglossa mbalensis
- Isoglossa nervosa
- Isoglossa ufipensis
- Justicia alexandri
- Justicia alterniflora
- Justicia attenuifolia
- Justicia brevipila
- Justicia camerunensis
- Justicia chalaensis
- Justicia galeata
- Justicia gilbertii
- Justicia heterotricha
- Justicia kiborianensis
- Justicia kulalensis
- Justicia lukei
- Justicia migeodii
- Justicia orbicularis
- Justicia riopalenquensis
- Justicia rodgersii
- Justicia sulphuriflora
- Justicia tigrina
- Justicia ukagurensis
- Lepidagathis perrieri
- Mimulopsis volleseniana
- Neriacanthus harlingii
- Neuracanthus ukambensis
- Nilgirianthus ciliatus
- Podorungia clandestina
- Podorungia humblotii
- Pseuderanthemum campylosiphon
- Pseuderanthemum dispersum
- Pseuderanthemum incisum
- Ruellia kuriensis
- Ruellia paulayana
- Staurogyne bicolor
- Stenandrium gabonicum
- Stenandrium harlingii
- Stenostephanus lugonis
- Stenostephanus luteynii
- Strobilanthes kunthiana
- Whitfieldia preussii

Subspecies

- Barleria mpandensis subsp. mpandensis
- Barleria mpandensis subsp. tomentella
- Brachystephanus coeruleus subsp. apiculatus
- Brachystephanus coeruleus subsp. coeruleus
- Brachystephanus jaundensis subsp. nimbae
- Dyschoriste keniensis subsp. glandulifera
- Isoglossa substrobilina subsp. tenuispicata
- Staurogyne kamerunensis subsp. calabarensis

==== Avicenniaceae ====
- Avicennia bicolor
- Avicennia integra
- Avicennia lanata
- Avicennia rumphiana

==== Bignoniaceae ====
- Amphitecna isthmica
- Amphitecna sessilifolia
- Catalpa brevipes
- Fernandoa ferdinandi
- Jacaranda arborea
- Jacaranda mimosifolia
- Parmentiera stenocarpa
- Phyllarthron cauliflorum
- Radermachera ramiflora
- Romeroa verticillata
- Spirotecoma apiculata
- Tabebuia anafensis
- Tabebuia arimaoensis
- Tabebuia bibracteolata
- Tabebuia dubia
- Tabebuia furfuracea
- Tabebuia hypoleuca
- Tabebuia jackiana
- Tabebuia lapacho
- Tabebuia oligolepis
- Tabebuia palustris
- Tabebuia polymorpha
- Tabebuia shaferi
- Tabebuia striata
- Zeyheria tuberculosa

==== Buddlejaceae ====
- Buddleja jamesonii
- Buddleja lanata
- Buddleja lojensis

==== Gesneriaceae ====
Species

- Alloplectus martinianus
- Alloplectus penduliflorus
- Columnea albiflora
- Columnea brenneri
- Columnea capillosa
- Columnea elongatifolia
- Columnea eubracteata
- Columnea katzensteinii
- Columnea mastersonii
- Columnea ovatifolia
- Columnea rileyi
- Columnea rubribracteata
- Cremosperma ecudoranum
- Cremosperma reldioides
- Cyrtandra denhamii
- Cyrtandra elbertii
- Cyrtandra kandavuensis
- Cyrtandra natewaensis
- Cyrtandra spathacea
- Cyrtandra tavinunensis
- Cyrtandra tempestii
- Damrongia cyanantha
- Diastema gymnoleuca
- Drymonia chiribogana
- Drymonia crenatiloba
- Drymonia pulchra
- Drymonia punctulata
- Gasteranthus imbaburensis
- Gasteranthus lateralis
- Gasteranthus otongensis
- Gasteranthus trifoliatus
- Monopyle ecuadorensis
- Nautilocalyx glandulifer
- Nodonema lineatum
- Paraboea acaulis
- Paraboea glandulifera
- Paraboea vulpina
- Paradrymonia aurea
- Paradrymonia fuquaiana
- Pearcea cordata
- Pearcea glabrata
- Petrocosmea bicolor
- Petrocosmea pubescens
- Phinaea ecuadorana
- Reldia multiflora
- Saintpaulia pusilla
- Streptocarpus compressus
- Streptocarpus holstii
- Streptocarpus kungwensis
- Streptocarpus parensis
- Streptocarpus schliebenii

Subspecies

- Saintpaulia ionantha subsp. grotei
- Saintpaulia ionantha subsp. ionantha
- Saintpaulia ionantha subsp. mafiensis
- Saintpaulia ionantha subsp. occidentalis
- Saintpaulia ionantha subsp. pendula

Varieties

- Rhytidophyllum grande var. laevigatum

==== Globulariaceae ====
- Globularia sarcophylla
- Globularia stygia

==== Lamiaceae ====
Species

- Aegiphila fasciculata
- Aegiphila monstrosa
- Aegiphila panamensis
- Aegiphila purpurascens
- Aegiphila rimbachii
- Aegiphila skutchii
- Clerodendrum anomalum
- Clerodendrum calcicola
- Clerodendrum denticulatum
- Clerodendrum galeatum
- Clerodendrum leucophloeum
- Clerodendrum lutambense
- Gmelina hainanensis
- Lepechinia mutica
- Lepechinia paniculata
- Lepechinia rufocampii
- Leucas flagellifera
- Leucas hagghierensis
- Leucas penduliflora
- Leucas samhaensis
- Origanum cordifolium
- Origanum ehrenbergii, Ehrenberg's marjoram
- Orthosiphon ferrugineus
- Oxera cauliflora
- Oxera macrocalyx
- Oxera nuda
- Platostoma fastigiatum
- Platostoma thymifolium
- Plectranthus bipinnatus
- Plectranthus cataractarum
- Plectranthus trullatus
- Plectranthus unguentarius
- Premna grandifolia
- Premna hans-joachimii
- Premna maxima
- Premna schliebenii
- Premna szemaoensis
- Premna tanganyikensis
- Salvia austromelissodora
- Salvia curticalyx
- Salvia flocculosa
- Salvia leucocephala
- Salvia trachyphylla
- Scutellaria alborosea
- Scutellaria sarmentosa
- Sideritis cypria
- Sideritis infernalis
- Sideritis javalambrensis
- Stachys sprucei
- Stachys trichophylla
- Teucrium turredanum
- Thymus markhotensis, Markhotian thyme
- Tinnea vesiculosa
- Vitex acunae
- Vitex ajugaeflora
- Vitex amaniensis
- Vitex keniensis, Meru oak
- Vitex parviflora
- Vitex urceolata
- Vitex zanzibarensis

Subspecies

- Plectranthus punctatus subsp. lanatus
- Stachys pseudohumifusa subsp. saxeri

Varieties

- Aegiphila cuneata var. hirsutissima
- Clerodendrum glabrum var. minutiflorum
- Vitex ferruginea var. amaniensis

==== Lentibulariaceae ====
- Genlisea barthlottii
- Pinguicula fontiqueriana
- Pinguicula mundi
- Utricularia albocaerulea
- Utricularia wightiana

==== Oleaceae ====
Species

- Chionanthus avilensis
- Chionanthus jamaicensis
- Chionanthus kinabaluensis
- Chionanthus micranthus
- Chionanthus richardsiae
- Chionanthus spiciferus
- Chionanthus wurdackii
- Jasminum elatum
- Jasminum noumeense
- Olea chimanimani
- Picconia excelsa

Subspecies

- Fraxinus caroliniana subsp. cubensis

Varieties

- Chionanthus caymanensis var. caymanensis

==== Plantaginaceae ====
- Plantago lacustris

==== Scrophulariaceae ====
- Bartsia alba
- Bartsia pumila
- Calceolaria adenanthera
- Calceolaria brachiata
- Calceolaria dilatata
- Calceolaria harlingii
- Calceolaria lanata
- Calceolaria oxyphylla
- Calceolaria pedunculata
- Calceolaria serrata
- Calceolaria spruceana
- Calceolaria stricta
- Calceolaria zamorana
- Castilleja ecuadorensis
- Cromidon pusillum
- Euphrasia marchesettii
- Galvezia lanceolata
- Graderia fruticosa
- Veronica barkeri, Barker's koromiko
- Linaria pseudolaxiflora, Maltese toadflax
- Nanorrhinum kuriense
- Rhabdotosperma ledermannii
- Scrophularia olgae, Olga's fig-wort
- Verbascum litigiosum
- Veronica micrantha

==== Verbenaceae ====
- Citharexylum gentryi
- Citharexylum grandiflorum
- Citharexylum lojense
- Citharexylum quereifolium
- Citharexylum rimbachii
- Citharexylum suberosum
- Citharexylum ternatum
- Coelocarpum haggierensis
- Lantana pastazensis
- Lippia salicifolia
- Rhaphithamnus venustus
- Stachytarpheta steyermarkii

=== Laurales ===
==== Hernandiaceae ====
- Gyrocarpus mocinoi
- Hernandia nukuhivensis
- Hernandia stokesii, synonym of Hernandia ovigera subsp. stokesii

==== Lauraceae ====
Species

- Actinodaphne albifrons
- Actinodaphne andamanica
- Actinodaphne bourneae
- Actinodaphne campanulata
- Actinodaphne dolichophylla
- Actinodaphne glauca
- Actinodaphne hookeri
- Actinodaphne johorensis
- Actinodaphne kontumi
- Actinodaphne kweichowensis
- Actinodaphne lanata
- Actinodaphne lawsonii
- Actinodaphne longipes
- Actinodaphne percoriacea
- Actinodaphne robusta
- Actinodaphne rufescens
- Actinodaphne speciosa
- Actinodaphne stenophylla
- Actinodaphne sulcata
- Actinodaphne tomentosa
- Aiouea amplexicaulis
- Aiouea areolata
- Aiouea bractefoliacea
- Aiouea chavarriana
- Aiouea chiapensis
- Aiouea formicaria
- Aiouea guatemalensis, synonym of Damburneya guatemalensis
- Aiouea haussknechtii
- Aiouea longipetiolata
- Aiouea obscura
- Aiouea zapatae
- Alseodaphne elmeri
- Alseodaphne glaucina
- Alseodaphne montana
- Alseodaphne obovata
- Alseodaphne owdenii
- Alseodaphne paludosa
- Alseodaphne pendulifolia
- Alseodaphne ridleyi
- Alseodaphne tomentosa
- Alseodaphne utilis
- Alseodaphne wrayi
- Alseodaphnopsis petiolaris
- Alseodaphnopsis rugosa
- Aniba bracteata
- Aniba excelsa
- Aniba jenmanii
- Aniba percoriacea
- Aniba perutilis
- Aniba ramageana
- Aniba vulcanicola
- Beilschmiedia acuta
- Beilschmiedia anacardioides
- Beilschmiedia andamanensis
- Beilschmiedia argentata
- Beilschmiedia assamica
- Beilschmiedia auriculata
- Beilschmiedia brevipaniculata
- Beilschmiedia brevipes
- Beilschmiedia caudata
- Beilschmiedia chevalieri
- Beilschmiedia clarkei
- Beilschmiedia curviramea
- Beilschmiedia cuspidata
- Beilschmiedia dalzellii
- Beilschmiedia dictyoneura
- Beilschmiedia dinklagei
- Beilschmiedia diversiflora
- Beilschmiedia fruticosa
- Beilschmiedia gilbertii
- Beilschmiedia glauciphylla
- Beilschmiedia grandifolia
- Beilschmiedia jacques-felixii
- Beilschmiedia kinabaluensis
- Beilschmiedia klainei
- Beilschmiedia kochummenii
- Beilschmiedia laotica
- Beilschmiedia lumutensis
- Beilschmiedia mannioides
- Beilschmiedia microcarpa
- Beilschmiedia microphylla
- Beilschmiedia miersii
- Beilschmiedia moratii
- Beilschmiedia murutensis
- Beilschmiedia novoguineensis
- Beilschmiedia oblongifolia
- Beilschmiedia ovalioides
- Beilschmiedia pedicellata
- Beilschmiedia penangiana
- Beilschmiedia pilosa
- Beilschmiedia rivularis
- Beilschmiedia rufohirtella
- Beilschmiedia sary
- Beilschmiedia scintillans
- Beilschmiedia talbotiae
- Beilschmiedia telupidensis
- Beilschmiedia wallichiana
- Beilschmiedia wieringae
- Beilschmiedia zeylanica
- Caryodaphnopsis baviensis
- Caryodaphnopsis fieldii
- Caryodaphnopsis malipoensis
- Cinnadenia malayana
- Cinnadenia paniculata
- Cinnamomum alternifolium
- Cinnamomum angustitepalum
- Cinnamomum capparu-coronde
- Cinnamomum contractum
- Cinnamomum dimorphandrum
- Cinnamomum ilicioides
- Cinnamomum impressinervium
- Cinnamomum kami
- Cinnamomum lawang
- Cinnamomum litseifolium
- Cinnamomum mabberleyi
- Cinnamomum macrocarpum
- Cinnamomum macrostemon
- Cinnamomum microphyllum
- Cinnamomum migao
- Cinnamomum ovalifolium
- Cinnamomum paiei
- Cinnamomum piniodorum
- Cinnamomum platyphyllum
- Cinnamomum sanjappae
- Cinnamomum splendens
- Cinnamomum sublanuginosum
- Cinnamomum sulphuratum
- Cinnamomum tahijanum
- Cinnamomum tetragonum
- Cinnamomum tsoi
- Cinnamomum validinerve
- Cinnamomum verum
- Cryptocarya alleniana
- Cryptocarya andamanica
- Cryptocarya barbellata
- Cryptocarya bracteolata
- Cryptocarya caesia
- Cryptocarya caloneura
- Cryptocarya chanthaburiensis
- Cryptocarya coriacea
- Cryptocarya cuprea
- Cryptocarya everettii
- Cryptocarya fagifolia
- Cryptocarya ferrarsi
- Cryptocarya gigantocarpa
- Cryptocarya ilocana
- Cryptocarya insularis
- Cryptocarya intermedia
- Cryptocarya iridescens
- Cryptocarya krameri
- Cryptocarya laotica
- Cryptocarya lawsonii
- Cryptocarya ledermannii
- Cryptocarya longepetiolata
- Cryptocarya mindanaensis
- Cryptocarya nigra
- Cryptocarya nova-anglica
- Cryptocarya oligocarpa
- Cryptocarya pallens
- Cryptocarya pulchella
- Cryptocarya retusa
- Cryptocarya rifaii
- Cryptocarya samarensis
- Cryptocarya schoddei
- Cryptocarya septentrionalis
- Cryptocarya spathulata
- Cryptocarya stocksii
- Cryptocarya subtriplinervia
- Cryptocarya tawaensis
- Cryptocarya thouvenotii
- Cryptocarya turrilliana
- Cryptocarya viridiflora
- Cryptocarya wrayi
- Cryptocarya yaanica
- Cryptocarya zollingeriana
- Damburneya bicolor
- Damburneya rudis
- Dehaasia celebica
- Dehaasia membranacea
- Dehaasia suborbicularis
- Endiandra bullata
- Endiandra clavigera
- Endiandra coriacea
- Endiandra euadenia
- Endiandra flavinervis
- Endiandra latifolia
- Endiandra lecardii
- Endiandra ledermannii
- Endiandra ochracea
- Endiandra sericea
- Endiandra sulavesiana
- Endiandra xylophylla
- Endlicheria arachnocome
- Endlicheria citriodora
- Endlicheria ferruginosa
- Endlicheria lhotzkyi
- Eusideroxylon zwageri, billian
- Licaria brittoniana
- Licaria caudata
- Licaria cubensis
- Licaria guatemalensis
- Licaria oppositifolia
- Licaria tomentosa
- Lindera andamanica
- Lindera annamensis
- Lindera apoensis
- Lindera bokorensis
- Lindera gracilipes
- Lindera melastomacea
- Litsea aban-gibotii
- Litsea albescens
- Litsea albida
- Litsea alveolata
- Litsea auriculata
- Litsea baticulin
- Litsea beilschmiediifolia
- Litsea beusekomii
- Litsea calophyllantha
- Litsea coelestis
- Litsea collina
- Litsea dilleniifolia
- Litsea ellipticibacca
- Litsea eugenioides
- Litsea fenestrata
- Litsea ficoidea
- Litsea gardneri
- Litsea ghatica
- Litsea globosa
- Litsea habbemensis
- Litsea honbaensis
- Litsea iteodaphne, synonym of Litsea saligna
- Litsea keralana
- Litsea kerrii
- Litsea kurzii
- Litsea longifolia, synonym of Litsea ligustrina
- Litsea mysorensis
- Litsea neocaledonica
- Litsea nigrescens
- Litsea nitida
- Litsea oleoides
- Litsea panamanja
- Litsea penangiana
- Litsea plateaefolia
- Litsea pseudolongifolia
- Litsea punctulata
- Litsea rubrobrunnea
- Litsea samoensis
- Litsea thorelii
- Litsea travancorica
- Litsea udayanii
- Litsea urdanetensis
- Machilus chrysotricha
- Machilus coriacea
- Machilus curranii
- Machilus foonchewii
- Machilus minkweiensis
- Machilus platycarpa
- Mezilaurus ita-uba
- Mezilaurus navalium
- Mezilaurus opaca
- Mezilaurus palcazuensis
- Mezilaurus vanderwerffii
- Nectandra aurea
- Nectandra baccans
- Nectandra bartlettiana
- Nectandra belizensis
- Nectandra canaliculata
- Nectandra dasystyla
- Nectandra egensis
- Nectandra fulva
- Nectandra grisea
- Nectandra japurensis
- Nectandra paranaensis
- Nectandra reflexa
- Nectandra roberto-andinoi
- Nectandra sordida
- Nectandra truxillensis
- Neolitsea fischeri
- Neolitsea kwangsiensis
- Neolitsea merrilliana
- Neolitsea microphylla
- Neolitsea mollissima
- Neolitsea siamensis
- Nothaphoebe condensa
- Nothaphoebe elata
- Nothaphoebe foetida
- Ocotea acuminatissima
- Ocotea alnifolia
- Ocotea arenicola
- Ocotea argylei, synonym of Ocotea kenyensis
- Ocotea basirecurva
- Ocotea beulahiae
- Ocotea beyrichii
- Ocotea brevipetiolata
- Ocotea bucheri
- Ocotea catharinensis
- Ocotea comata
- Ocotea disjuncta
- Ocotea dominicana
- Ocotea eggersiana
- Ocotea fendleri
- Ocotea flavantha
- Ocotea foveolata
- Ocotea gordonii
- Ocotea holdridgeana
- Ocotea immersa
- Ocotea imrayana
- Ocotea indirectinervia
- Ocotea ivohibensis
- Ocotea kenyensis
- Ocotea longipes
- Ocotea macrocarpa
- Ocotea magnifrons
- Ocotea malcomberi
- Ocotea marmellensis
- Ocotea michelsonii, synonym of Kuloa michelsonii
- Ocotea moschata
- Ocotea multiflora
- Ocotea pedicellata
- Ocotea petalanthera
- Ocotea piurensis
- Ocotea porosa
- Ocotea portoricensis
- Ocotea pretiosa, synonym of Ocotea odorifera
- Ocotea psychotrioides
- Ocotea rhytidotricha
- Ocotea robertsoniae
- Ocotea rotundata
- Ocotea sandwithii
- Ocotea scalariformis
- Ocotea scandens
- Ocotea spathulata
- Ocotea sprucei
- Ocotea standleyi
- Ocotea sulcata
- Ocotea terciopelo
- Ocotea trichophlebia
- Ocotea ucayalensis
- Ocotea vanderwerffii
- Ocotea vasquezii
- Ocotea vegrandis
- Ocotea viridiflora
- Ocotea zahamenensis
- Persea brenesii
- Persea buchtienii
- Persea bullata
- Persea chrysophylla
- Persea corymbosa
- Persea croatii
- Persea donnell-smithii
- Persea endothrix
- Persea fendleri
- Persea floccosa
- Persea hintonii
- Persea jenmanii
- Persea meridensis
- Persea microphylla
- Persea nudigemma
- Persea oblongifolia
- Persea palustris
- Persea raimondii
- Persea silvatica
- Persea urbaniana
- Phoebe angustifolia
- Phoebe chekiangensis
- Phoebe excelsa
- Phoebe hungmoensis
- Phoebe kerrii
- Phoebe macrocarpa
- Phoebe zhennan
- Pleurothyrium acuminatum
- Pleurothyrium maximum
- Pleurothyrium palmanum
- Pleurothyrium pauciflorum
- Pleurothyrium prancei
- Pleurothyrium synandrum
- Pleurothyrium tomentellum
- Pleurothyrium williamsii
- Potameia crassifolia
- Potameia microphylla
- Potameia obtusifolia
- Rhodostemonodaphne dioica
- Rhodostemonodaphne frontinensis
- Rhodostemonodaphne longipetiolata
- Rhodostemonodaphne napoensis
- Rhodostemonodaphne sordida
- Rhodostemonodaphne synandra

Varieties

- Actinodaphne campanulata var. campanulata
- Persea podadenia var. glabriramea
- Umbellularia californica var. fresnensis

==== Monimiaceae ====
- Decarydendron helenae
- Decarydendron lamii
- Decarydendron perrieri
- Kibara obtusa
- Kibara royenii
- Mollinedia glabra
- Mollinedia marquetiana
- Mollinedia steinbachiana
- Tambourissa capuronii
- Tambourissa longicarpa
- Tambourissa manongarivensis
- Tambourissa parvifolia
- Tambourissa uapacifolia

==== Siparunaceae ====
- Siparuna cascada
- Siparuna lozaniana
- Siparuna palenquensis
- Siparuna vasqueziana

=== Linales ===
- Erythroxylum incrassatum
- Erythroxylum jamaicense
- Erythroxylum kochummenii
- Erythroxylum obtusifolium
- Erythroxylum pacificum
- Hugonia macrophylla
- Hugonia micans
- Ixonanthes chinensis, synonym of Ixonanthes reticulata
- Ixonanthes khasiana, synonym of Ixonanthes reticulata
- Linum katiae
- Linum muelleri
- Vantanea peruviana
- Vantanea spichigeri

=== Magnoliales ===
There are 270 species, 55 subspecies, and 28 varieties in the order Magnoliales assessed as vulnerable.

==== Annonaceae ====
Species

- Alphonsea havilandii
- Alphonsea lucida
- Alphonsea monogyna
- Alphonsea zeylanica
- Ambavia capuronii
- Anaxagorea brevipedicellata
- Anaxagorea floribunda
- Anaxagorea macrantha
- Anaxagorea pachypetala
- Annickia lebrunii
- Annona asplundiana
- Annona caesia
- Annona calcarata
- Annona cercocarpa
- Annona conica
- Annona deceptrix
- Annona fosteri
- Annona gigantophylla
- Annona glomerulifera
- Annona haitiensis
- Annona hispida
- Annona inconformis
- Annona jamaicensis
- Annona neochrysocarpa
- Annona pachyantha
- Annona pruinosa
- Annona scandens
- Annona sclerophylla
- Annona xylopiifolia
- Boutiquea platypetala, synonym of Neostenanthera neurosericea
- Cremastosperma longicuspe
- Cremastosperma novogranatense
- Cremastosperma peruvianum
- Cremastosperma yamayakatense
- Cyathocalyx globosus
- Cyathocalyx magnifructus
- Cymbopetalum alkekengi
- Dasymaschalon longiflorum
- Dasymaschalon scandens
- Desmopsis biseriata
- Desmopsis dukei
- Desmopsis oerstedii
- Desmopsis standleyana
- Desmopsis subnuda
- Desmopsis trunciflora
- Drepananthus acuminatus
- Drepananthus apoensis
- Drepananthus hexagynus
- Duguetia arenicola
- Duguetia bahiensis
- Duguetia colombiana
- Duguetia gentryi
- Duguetia granvilleana
- Duguetia guianensis
- Duguetia macrocalyx
- Duguetia megalophylla
- Duguetia pohliana
- Duguetia riberensis
- Duguetia tobagensis
- Ephedranthus boliviensis
- Ephedranthus columbianus
- Fenerivia angustielliptica
- Fenerivia capuronii
- Fenerivia chapelieri
- Fenerivia humbertii
- Fenerivia oligosperma
- Fenerivia richardiana
- Goniothalamus amuyon
- Goniothalamus aurantiacus
- Goniothalamus bracteosus
- Goniothalamus cardiopetalus
- Goniothalamus crockerensis
- Goniothalamus gardneri
- Goniothalamus hookeri
- Goniothalamus kamarudinii
- Goniothalamus kinabaluensis
- Goniothalamus macrocalyx
- Goniothalamus maewongensis
- Goniothalamus montanus
- Goniothalamus rhynchantherus
- Goniothalamus stenopetalus
- Goniothalamus thomsonii
- Goniothalamus thwaitesii
- Goniothalamus undulatus
- Goniothalamus wrayi
- Greenwayodendron littorale
- Guatteria aberrans
- Guatteria antioquensis
- Guatteria arenicola
- Guatteria caribaea
- Guatteria galeottiana
- Guatteria gentryi
- Guatteria grandiflora
- Guatteria maguirei
- Guatteria meliodora
- Guatteria pichinchae
- Guatteria procera
- Guatteria sanctae-crucis
- Guatteria venosa
- Hexalobus mossambicensis
- Hornschuchia myrtillus
- Hornschuchia polyantha
- Huberantha asymmetrica
- Huberantha flava
- Huberantha perrieri
- Huberantha sambiranensis
- Isolona cauliflora
- Isolona deightonii
- Isolona heinsenii
- Isolona lebrunii
- Isolona perrieri
- Isolona pilosa
- Klarobelia lucida
- Klarobelia napoensis
- Klarobelia stipitata
- Maasia ovalifolia
- Malmea cuspidata, synonym of Pseudoxandra laevigata
- Meiogyne amygdalina
- Meiogyne hainanense
- Mezzettia macrocarpa
- Mezzettia umbellata
- Miliusa amplexicaulis
- Miliusa nilagirica
- Miliusa parviflora
- Miliusa wayanadica
- Miliusa zeylanica
- Mitrephora alba
- Mitrephora amdjahii
- Mitrephora calcarea
- Mitrephora clemensiorum
- Mitrephora fragrans
- Mitrephora grandiflora
- Mitrephora polypyrena
- Mitrephora rufescens
- Mitrephora vulpina
- Mitrephora winitii
- Mkilua fragrans
- Monanthotaxis suffruticosa
- Monanthotaxis trichantha
- Monocarpia borneensis
- Monocarpia euneura
- Monocyclanthus vignei
- Monodora stenopetala
- Monodora unwinii
- Monodora zenkeri
- Monoon cupulare
- Monoon merrillii
- Monoon oblongifolium
- Monoon praestigiosum
- Mosannona costaricensis
- Mosannona maculata
- Mosannona pachiteae
- Mwasumbia alba
- Orophea erythrocarpa
- Orophea glabra
- Orophea kerrii
- Orophea palawanensis, synonym of Orophea creaghii
- Orophea submaculata, synonym of Orophea cumingiana
- Orophea zeylanica
- Oxandra maya
- Oxandra sphaerocarpa
- Piptostigma calophyllum
- Piptostigma giganteum
- Piptostigma goslineanum
- Piptostigma macrophyllum
- Piptostigma oyemense
- Polyalthia ichthyosma
- Polyalthia lasioclada
- Polyalthia montis-silam
- Polyalthia spathulata
- Polyalthia sympetala
- Porcelia steinbachii
- Pseudephedranthus enigmaticus
- Pseudoxandra acreana
- Pseudoxandra bahiensis
- Pseudoxandra cauliflora
- Pseudoxandra sclerocarpa
- Pseuduvaria fragrans
- Pseuduvaria monticola
- Pseuduvaria parvipetala
- Pseuduvaria philippinensis
- Pseuduvaria prainii
- Richella hainanensis, synonym of Friesodielsia hainanensis
- Sirdavidia solannona
- Tetrameranthus globuliferus
- Tetrameranthus umbellatus
- Trigynaea lagaropoda
- Unonopsis asterantha
- Unonopsis esmeraldae
- Unonopsis hammelii
- Unonopsis magnifolia
- Unonopsis megalophylla
- Unonopsis onychopetaloides
- Unonopsis penduliflora
- Uvaria antsiranensis
- Uvaria bathiei
- Uvaria buchholzii
- Uvaria combretifolia
- Uvaria commersoniana
- Uvaria lungonyana
- Uvaria tanzaniae
- Uvariodendron angustifolium
- Uvariodendron anisatum
- Uvariodendron kirkii
- Uvariodendron occidentale
- Uvariopsis vanderystii, synonym of Uvariopsis pedunculosa
- Uvariopsis zenkeri
- Xylopia africana
- Xylopia arenaria
- Xylopia beananensis
- Xylopia brasiliensis
- Xylopia coriifolia
- Xylopia elliptica
- Xylopia gilbertii
- Xylopia involucrata
- Xylopia lemurica
- Xylopia mildbraedii
- Xylopia monticola
- Xylopia nilotica
- Xylopia orestera
- Xylopia pallescens
- Xylopia peruviana
- Xylopia plowmanii
- Xylopia richardii
- Xylopia toussaintii
- Xylopia trichostemon

Subspecies

- Asteranthe asterias subsp. triangularis

==== Magnoliaceae ====
Species

- Magnolia albosericea
- Magnolia amoena
- Magnolia annamensis
- Magnolia bankardiorum
- Magnolia blaoensis
- Magnolia costaricensis
- Magnolia cristalensis
- Magnolia cubensis
- Magnolia cylindrica
- Magnolia dodecapetala
- Magnolia duperreana
- Magnolia hongheensis
- Magnolia iltisiana
- Magnolia kwangsiensis
- Magnolia mannii
- Magnolia mexicana
- Magnolia mindoensis
- Magnolia multinervia
- Magnolia nilagirica
- Magnolia nitida
- Magnolia oblongifolia
- Magnolia odora, Tsong's tree
- Magnolia quangninhensis
- Magnolia rajaniana
- Magnolia sabahensis
- Magnolia sambuensis
- Magnolia sapaensis
- Magnolia sargentiana
- Magnolia schiedeana
- Magnolia talamancana
- Magnolia thailandica
- Magnolia vargasiana
- Magnolia yoroconte

Subspecies

- Magnolia guatemalensis subsp. guatemalensis, synonym of Magnolia guatemalensis
- Magnolia guatemalensis subsp. hondurensis, synonym of Magnolia hondurensis
- Magnolia sieboldii subsp. sinensis
- Magnolia sororum subsp. lutea
- Magnolia sororum subsp. sororum

Varieties

- Magnolia fordiana var. forrestii

==== Myristicaceae ====
Species

- Endocomia virella
- Gymnacranthera canarica
- Horsfieldia amplomontana
- Horsfieldia androphora
- Horsfieldia angularis
- Horsfieldia atjehensis
- Horsfieldia decalvata
- Horsfieldia elongata
- Horsfieldia flocculosa
- Horsfieldia fragillima
- Horsfieldia fulva
- Horsfieldia gracilis
- Horsfieldia hirtiflora
- Horsfieldia longiflora
- Horsfieldia macilenta
- Horsfieldia motleyi
- Horsfieldia nervosa
- Horsfieldia obscura
- Horsfieldia paucinervis
- Horsfieldia perangusta
- Horsfieldia pulcherrima
- Horsfieldia punctata
- Horsfieldia rufolanata
- Horsfieldia sabulosa
- Horsfieldia sterilis
- Horsfieldia talaudensis
- Horsfieldia tenuifolia
- Horsfieldia tristis
- Iryanthera dialyandra
- Knema alvarezii
- Knema austrosiamensis
- Knema bengalensis
- Knema communis
- Knema conica
- Knema hookeriana
- Knema kostermansiana
- Knema krusemaniana
- Knema lamellaria
- Knema lampongensis
- Knema mixta
- Knema muscosa
- Knema pachycarpa
- Knema pierrei
- Knema piriformis
- Knema plumulosa
- Knema poilanei
- Knema psilantha
- Knema retusa
- Knema rufa
- Knema saxatilis
- Knema sericea
- Knema sessiflora
- Knema squamulosa
- Knema subhirtella
- Knema tonkinensis
- Knema viridis
- Mauloutchia parvifolia
- Myristica ampliata, synonym of Myristica insipida var. cimicifera
- Myristica andamanica
- Myristica arfakensis
- Myristica argentea
- Myristica ceylanica
- Myristica conspersa
- Myristica corticata
- Myristica dactyloides
- Myristica devogelii
- Myristica extensa
- Myristica fallax
- Myristica fissurata
- Myristica frugifera
- Myristica lasiocarpa
- Myristica magnifica
- Myristica malabarica
- Myristica mediterranea
- Myristica millepunctata
- Myristica papillatifolia
- Myristica petiolata
- Myristica rubrinervis
- Myristica tenuivenia
- Myristica trianthera
- Myristica ultrabasica
- Pycnanthus microcephalus
- Staudtia pterocarpa
- Virola allenii
- Virola fosteri
- Virola guggenheimii
- Virola malmei
- Virola parvifolia
- Virola urbaniana

Subspecies

- Horsfieldia penangiana subsp. obtusifolia
- Horsfieldia penangiana subsp. penangiana
- Horsfieldia sucosa subsp. bifissa
- Horsfieldia xanthina subsp. macrophylla
- Horsfieldia xanthina subsp. xanthina
- Knema andamanica subsp. andamanica
- Knema andamanica subsp. nicobarica
- Knema andamanica subsp. peninsularis
- Knema korthalsii subsp. rimosa
- Knema kunstleri subsp. coriacea
- Knema kunstleri subsp. leptophylla
- Knema kunstleri subsp. macrophylla
- Knema kunstleri subsp. pseudostellata
- Knema latericia subsp. latericia
- Knema oblongata subsp. parviflora
- Knema oblongata subsp. pedunculata
- Knema pectinata subsp. vestita
- Knema rigidifolia subsp. camerona
- Knema stellata subsp. minahassae
- Knema stellata subsp. stellata
- Knema tenuinervia subsp. kanburiensis
- Knema tridactyla subsp. pachydactyla
- Knema tridactyla subsp. salicifolia
- Knema tridactyla subsp. sublaevis
- Knema tridactyla subsp. tridactyla
- Myristica agusanensis subsp. squamulosa
- Myristica crassipes subsp. marronia
- Myristica duplopunctata subsp. duplopunctata
- Myristica duplopunctata subsp. versteeghii
- Myristica fugax subsp. fugax
- Myristica fugax subsp. septentrionalis
- Myristica fusiformis subsp. fusiformis
- Myristica fusiformis subsp. pseudostipitata
- Myristica kajewski subsp. robusta
- Myristica laevis subsp. badia
- Myristica laevis subsp. laevis
- Myristica lancifolia subsp. australiana
- Myristica lancifolia subsp. kutubuensis
- Myristica malaccensis subsp. papillosa
- Myristica rosselensis subsp. minutiflora
- Myristica simiarum subsp. calcarea
- Myristica tenuivenia subsp. lignosa
- Myristica tristis subsp. ingambitense
- Myristica tristis subsp. louisiadensis
- Myristica tristis subsp. sessilifructa
- Myristica velutina subsp. breviflora
- Myristica warburgii subsp. hybrida
- Myristica warburgii subsp. siphonantha

Varieties

- Horsfieldia glabra var. javanica
- Horsfieldia glabra var. oviflora
- Horsfieldia hellwigii var. brachycarpa
- Horsfieldia moluccana var. pubescens
- Horsfieldia moluccana var. robusta
- Horsfieldia pallidicaula var. macrocarya
- Horsfieldia pallidicaula var. microcarya
- Horsfieldia pallidicaula var. pallidicaula
- Horsfieldia polyspherula var. maxima
- Horsfieldia subtilis var. rostrata
- Horsfieldia tuberculata var. crassivalva
- Knema ashtonii var. ashtonii
- Knema ashtonii var. cinnamomea
- Knema curtisii var. amoena
- Knema curtisii var. arenosa
- Knema curtisii var. paludosa
- Knema glauca var. riparia
- Knema hirtella var. pilocarpa
- Myristica mediovibex var. kosteriana
- Myristica mediovibex var. mediovibex
- Myristica rubrinervis var. duplex
- Myristica rubrinervis var. rubrinervis
- Myristica rumphii var. florentis
- Myristica subalulata var. hagensis
- Myristica subalulata var. leptantha
- Myristica subalulata var. pedunculata
- Myristica subcordata var. rimosa

=== Malvales ===
==== Bombacaceae ====
- Bombacopsis quinata
- Ceiba rosea
- Cullenia ceylanica
- Eriotheca peruviana
- Huberodendron patinoi
- Kostermansia malayana, durian tuang
- Matisia stenopetala
- Phragmotheca rubriflora
- Quararibea dolichosiphon
- Quararibea gomeziana
- Quararibea platyphylla
- Quararibea pterocalyx, wild palm
- Quararibea velutina
- Rhodognaphalon brevicuspe

==== Dipterocarpaceae ====
Species

- Anisoptera aurea
- Anisoptera curtisii
- Anisoptera laevis
- Anisoptera marginata
- Anisoptera thurifera
- Cotylelobium lanceolatum
- Dipterocarpus alatus
- Dipterocarpus applanatus
- Dipterocarpus baudii
- Dipterocarpus concavus
- Dipterocarpus costatus
- Dipterocarpus crinitus
- Dipterocarpus elongatus
- Dipterocarpus fagineus
- Dipterocarpus gracilis
- Dipterocarpus mundus
- Dipterocarpus pachyphyllus
- Dipterocarpus palembanicus
- Dipterocarpus rigidus
- Dipterocarpus sarawakensis
- Dipterocarpus stellatus
- Dipterocarpus turbinatus
- Dryobalanops aromatica
- Dryobalanops keithii
- Hopea acuminata
- Hopea andersonii
- Hopea beccariana
- Hopea celtidifolia
- Hopea coriacea
- Hopea ferruginea
- Hopea glaucescens
- Hopea johorensis
- Hopea kerangasensis
- Hopea malibato
- Hopea mengarawan
- Hopea modesta
- Hopea myrtifolia
- Hopea nigra
- Hopea oblongifolia
- Hopea odorata
- Hopea pachycarpa
- Hopea pentanervia
- Hopea pierrei
- Hopea ponga
- Hopea pubescens
- Hopea sangal
- Hopea sublanceolata
- Monotes doryphorus
- Monotes pearsonii
- Monotes rubriglans
- Parashorea stellata
- Shorea acuminatissima, synonym of Richetia acuminatissima
- Shorea affinis, synonym of Doona affinis
- Shorea albida, synonym of Rubroshorea albida
- Shorea andulensis, synonym of Rubroshorea andulensis
- Shorea atrinervosa
- Shorea bakoensis, synonym of Richetia bakoensis
- Shorea balangeran, synonym of Rubroshorea balangeran
- Shorea bentongensis, synonym of Anthoshorea bentongensis
- Shorea blumutensis, synonym of Richetia blumutensis
- Shorea bullata, synonym of Rubroshorea bullata
- Shorea chaiana, synonym of Richetia chaiana
- Shorea collaris, synonym of Richetia collaris
- Shorea collina
- Shorea confusa, synonym of Anthoshorea confusa
- Shorea congestiflora, synonym of Doona congestiflora
- Shorea cordifolia, synonym of Doona cordifolia
- Shorea cuspidata, synonym of Richetia cuspidata
- Shorea dealbata, synonym of Anthoshorea dealbata
- Shorea disticha, synonym of Doona disticha
- Shorea dyeri
- Shorea falcifera
- Shorea falciferoides
- Shorea ferruginea, synonym of Rubroshorea ferruginea
- Shorea flaviflora, synonym of Rubroshorea flaviflora
- Shorea flemmichii, synonym of Rubroshorea flemmichii
- Shorea foxworthyi
- Shorea furfuracea
- Shorea gardneri, synonym of Doona gardneri
- Shorea geniculata
- Shorea gibbosa, synonym of Richetia gibbosa
- Shorea guiso
- Shorea hemsleyana, synonym of Rubroshorea hemsleyana
- Shorea hypoleuca
- Shorea inappendiculata
- Shorea isoptera, synonym of Neohopea isoptera
- Shorea johorensis, synonym of Rubroshorea johorensis
- Shorea ladiana
- Shorea laevis
- Shorea lissophylla
- Shorea longiflora, synonym of Richetia longiflora
- Shorea malibato
- Shorea mecistopteryx, synonym of Rubroshorea mecistopteryx
- Shorea megistophylla, synonym of Doona macrophylla
- Shorea mujongensis, synonym of Richetia mujongensis
- Shorea oblongifolia
- Shorea obovoidea, synonym of Richetia obovoidea
- Shorea obscura
- Shorea ochracea, synonym of Anthoshorea ochracea
- Shorea ochrophloia
- Shorea peltata, synonym of Richetia peltata
- Shorea polyandra, synonym of Richetia polyandra
- Shorea quadrinervis, synonym of Rubroshorea quadrinervis
- Shorea resinosa, synonym of Anthoshorea resinosa
- Shorea retinodes, synonym of Anthoshorea retinodes
- Shorea retusa, synonym of Rubroshorea retusa
- Shorea richetia, synonym of Richetia coriacea
- Shorea roxburghii, synonym of Anthoshorea roxburghii
- Shorea rubella, synonym of Rubroshorea rubella
- Shorea rugosa, synonym of Rubroshorea rugosa
- Shorea selanica, synonym of Rubroshorea selanica
- Shorea singkawang, synonym of Rubroshorea singkawang
- Shorea slootenii, synonym of Rubroshorea slootenii
- Shorea smithiana, synonym of Rubroshorea smithiana
- Shorea stipularis, synonym of Anthoshorea stipularis
- Shorea subcylindrica, synonym of Richetia subcylindrica
- Shorea superba
- Shorea symingtonii, synonym of Anthoshorea symingtonii
- Shorea thorelii
- Shorea trapezifolia, synonym of Doona trapezifolia
- Shorea worthingtonii, synonym of Doona venulosa
- Stemonoporus acuminatus
- Stemonoporus gardneri
- Upuna borneensis
- Vatica badiifolia
- Vatica compressa
- Vatica glabrata
- Vatica hullettii
- Vateria indica
- Vatica javanica
- Vatica maingayi
- Vatica mangachapoi
- Vatica maritima
- Vatica obscura
- Vatica parvifolia
- Vatica pauciflora
- Vatica pedicellata
- Vatica perakensis, synonym of Vatica lowii
- Vatica sarawakensis
- Vatica stapfiana

Subspecies

- Dipterocarpus conformis subsp. borneensis
- Vatica oblongifolia subsp. oblongifolia
- Vatica oblongifolia subsp. selakoensis

==== Elaeocarpaceae ====
Species

- Elaeocarpus acmosepalus
- Elaeocarpus apiculatus
- Elaeocarpus brigittae
- Elaeocarpus colnettianus
- Elaeocarpus dinagatensis
- Elaeocarpus eriobotryoides
- Elaeocarpus fraseri
- Elaeocarpus gigantifolius
- Elaeocarpus glandulifer
- Elaeocarpus inopinatus
- Elaeocarpus miriensis
- Elaeocarpus moratii
- Elaeocarpus prunifolius
- Elaeocarpus recurvatus
- Elaeocarpus royenii
- Elaeocarpus rugosus
- Elaeocarpus simaluensis
- Elaeocarpus subvillosus
- Elaeocarpus venustus
- Sloanea acutiflora
- Sloanea gracilis
- Sloanea lepida
- Sloanea suaveolens

Subspecies

- Elaeocarpus beccarii subsp. beccarii
- Elaeocarpus beccarii subsp. nitens
- Elaeocarpus beccarii subsp. sumatrana
- Elaeocarpus submonoceras subsp. fusicarpus
- Elaeocarpus submonoceras subsp. oxypyren
- Elaeocarpus submonoceras subsp. procerus
- Elaeocarpus submonoceras subsp. submonoceras
- Elaeocarpus teysmannii subsp. domatiferus
- Elaeocarpus teysmannii subsp. moluccensis
- Elaeocarpus teysmannii subsp. morowalensis
- Elaeocarpus teysmannii subsp. rhizophorus
- Elaeocarpus teysmannii subsp. teysmannii

Varieties

- Elaeocarpus calomala var. pustulatus

==== Malvaceae ====
Species

- Acropogon aoupiniensis
- Acropogon domatifer
- Acropogon fatsioides
- Acropogon megaphyllus
- Brachychiton carruthersii
- Brachychiton velutinosus
- Byttneria jaramilloana
- Byttneria sparrei
- Cola bracteata
- Cola duparquetiana
- Cola gigas
- Cola glabra
- Cola hypochrysea
- Cola letestui
- Cola mossambicensis
- Cola reticulata
- Cola scheffleri
- Cola suboppositifolia
- Cola umbratilis
- Dombeya amaniensis
- Dombeya longebracteolata
- Durio acutifolius
- Durio dulcis
- Durio kutejensis
- Durio lowianus
- Durio pinangianus
- Durio testudinarius
- Eriolaena lushingtonii
- Firmiana hainanensis
- Gossypium hirsutum
- Hampea micrantha
- Hampea reynae
- Hampea sphaerocarpa
- Heritiera longipetiolata
- Heritiera parvifolia
- Heritiera utilis
- Hibiscus greenwayi
- Hibiscus holstii
- Hibiscus malacophyllus
- Hibiscus masasianus
- Hibiscus scottii
- Hildegardia perrieri
- Matisia jefensis
- Nesogordonia bernieri
- Nesogordonia papaverifera
- Nesogordonia thouarsii
- Nototriche ecuadoriensis
- Pterospermum reticulatum
- Pterygota bequaertii
- Pterygota macrocarpa
- Robinsonella brevituba
- Robinsonella mirandae
- Robinsonella samaricarpa
- Scaphium longiflorum
- Scaphopetalum parvifolium
- Sterculia alexandri
- Sterculia oblonga, yellow sterculia
- Sterculia schliebenii
- Wercklea intermedia

Subspecies

- Hibiscus kokio subsp. kokio

==== Sarcolaenaceae ====
- Leptolaena delphinensis
- Sarcolaena grandiflora
- Schizolaena microphylla
- Schizolaena parviflora
- Schizolaena pectinata
- Schizolaena viscosa
- Xerochlamys coriacea
- Xerochlamys tampoketsensis

==== Tiliaceae ====
- Asterophorum mennegae
- Brownlowia kleinhovioidea
- Burretiodendron esquirolii
- Diplodiscus paniculatus
- Grewia aldabrensis
- Grewia bilocularis
- Grewia milleri
- Grewia salicifolia
- Grewia turbinata
- Microcos erythrocarpa
- Mollia glabrescens
- Pentace acuta
- Pentace exima
- Pentace microlepidota
- Pentace perakensis
- Schoutenia kunstleri

==== Thymelaeaceae ====
- Aquilaria banaensae
- Aquilaria beccariana
- Aquilaria cumingiana
- Aquilaria hirta
- Aquilaria malaccensis, aloewood
- Aquilaria microcarpa
- Aquilaria sinensis
- Daphne rodriguezii
- Daphnopsis calcicola
- Daphnopsis pavonii
- Dicranolepis polygaloides
- Gnidia decaryana
- Gonystylus affinis
- Gonystylus bancanus
- Gonystylus calophylloides
- Gonystylus calophyllus
- Gonystylus consanguineus
- Gonystylus costalis
- Gonystylus decipiens
- Gonystylus glaucescens
- Gonystylus keithii
- Gonystylus lucidulus
- Gonystylus macrophyllus
- Gonystylus maingayi
- Gonystylus micranthus
- Gonystylus nervosus
- Gonystylus nobilis
- Gonystylus othmanii
- Gonystylus pendulus
- Gonystylus spectabilis
- Gonystylus stenosepalus
- Gonystylus xylocarpus
- Stephanodaphne cuspidata

==== Other Malvales species ====
- Dialyceras coriaceum
- Rhopalocarpus undulatus

=== Malpighiales ===
==== Calophyllaceae ====
Species

- Calophyllum apetalum
- Calophyllum archipelagi
- Calophyllum ardens
- Calophyllum austroindicum
- Calophyllum balansae
- Calophyllum bracteatum
- Calophyllum carrii
- Calophyllum castaneum
- Calophyllum caudatum
- Calophyllum chapelieri
- Calophyllum complanatum
- Calophyllum confertum
- Calophyllum confusum
- Calophyllum cordato-oblongum
- Calophyllum drouhardii
- Calophyllum havilandii
- Calophyllum hirasimum
- Calophyllum lowei
- Calophyllum moonii
- Calophyllum morobensis
- Calophyllum nubicola
- Calophyllum obscurum
- Calophyllum paniculatum
- Calophyllum parvifolium
- Calophyllum recedens
- Calophyllum rivulare
- Calophyllum rotundifolium
- Calophyllum rufinerve
- Calophyllum sakarium
- Calophyllum savannarum
- Calophyllum scriblitifolium
- Calophyllum suberosum
- Calophyllum thwaitesii
- Calophyllum tomentosum
- Calophyllum trachycaule
- Calophyllum verticillatum
- Calophyllum walkeri
- Caraipa jaramilloi
- Caraipa rodriguesii
- Caraipa utilis
- Kayea borneensis
- Kielmeyera albopunctata
- Lebrunia bushaie
- Mammea angustifolia
- Mammea malayana
- Mammea timorensis
- Marila cespedesiana
- Marila geminata
- Marila grandiflora
- Mesua ferrea
- Mesua kochummeniana
- Mesua purseglovei

Varieties

- Calophyllum carrii var. carrii
- Calophyllum carrii var. longigemmatum

==== Chrysobalanaceae ====
Species

- Atuna penangiana
- Bafodeya benna
- Couepia comosa
- Couepia eriantha
- Couepia schottii
- Dactyladenia dinklagei
- Dactyladenia gilletii
- Dactyladenia librevillensis
- Geobalanus riverae
- Hirtella angustifolia
- Hirtella caduca
- Hirtella macrosepala
- Hirtella recurva
- Hirtella thouarsiana
- Hunga mackeeana
- Hunga papuana
- Hymenopus conferruminatus
- Leptobalanus sparsipilis
- Licania buxifolia
- Licania calvescens
- Licania cuprea
- Magnistipula cerebriformis
- Maranthes sanagensis
- Moquilea araneosa
- Moquilea belloi
- Moquilea cabrerae
- Moquilea megalophylla
- Parastemon grandifructus
- Parinari congolana
- Parinari metallica

Subspecies

- Parinari papuana subsp. salomonense

Varieties

- Licania intrapetiolaris var. brevis
- Magnistipula butayei var. greenwayi
- Magnistipula butayei var. sargosii

==== Clusiaceae ====
Species

- Allanblackia gabonensis
- Allanblackia kisonghi
- Allanblackia staneriana
- Allanblackia ulugurensis
- Chrysochlamys guatemaltecana
- Clusia cardonae
- Clusia chusqueae
- Clusia clarendonensis
- Clusia cundinamarcensis
- Clusia cupulata
- Clusia domingensis
- Clusia fistulosa
- Clusia gratula
- Clusia guayanae
- Clusia hachensis
- Clusia imbricata
- Clusia longipetiolata
- Clusia maguireana
- Clusia moaensis
- Clusia phelpsiana
- Clusia polystigma
- Clusia portlandiana
- Clusia pringlei
- Clusia radiata
- Clusia tarmensis
- Clusia volubilis
- Garcinia acutifolia
- Garcinia afzelii
- Garcinia aphanophlebia
- Garcinia arenicola
- Garcinia asterandra
- Garcinia barkeriana
- Garcinia brevipedicellata, synonym of Garcinia afzelii
- Garcinia carolinensis
- Garcinia clusiifolia
- Garcinia costata
- Garcinia crassifolia
- Garcinia cymosa
- Garcinia dauphinensis
- Garcinia decussata
- Garcinia evonymoides
- Garcinia holttumii
- Garcinia indica
- Garcinia kola
- Garcinia lanessanii
- Garcinia lujae
- Garcinia macgregorii
- Garcinia megistophylla
- Garcinia montana
- Garcinia picrorhiza
- Garcinia quaesita
- Garcinia robsoniana
- Garcinia ruscifolia
- Garcinia staudtii
- Garcinia succifolia
- Garcinia verticillata
- Garcinia vriesiana
- Montrouziera cauliflora
- Moronobea ptaritepuiana
- Pentadesma lebrunii
- Symphonia eugenioides
- Symphonia lepidocarpa
- Symphonia linearis
- Symphonia sessiliflora
- Tovomita calophyllophylla
- Tovomita chachapoyasensis
- Tovomita microcarpa, synonym of Chrysochlamys microcarpa
- Tovomita weberbaueri

Varieties

- Garcinia terpnophylla var. acuminata
- Garcinia terpnophylla var. terpnophylla

==== Euphorbiaceae ====
Species

- Acalypha andina
- Acalypha grandibracteata
- Acalypha guineensis
- Acalypha hontauyuensis
- Acalypha lepinei
- Acalypha psamofila
- Acalypha radula
- Acalypha suirenbiensis
- Acalypha tunguraguae
- Acidocroton verrucosus
- Agrostistachys coriacea
- Alchornea sodiroi
- Aristogeitonia monophylla
- Austrobuxus cracens
- Baloghia balansae
- Baloghia montana
- Baloghia neocaledonica
- Cephalocroton socotranus
- Cephalomappa sinensis
- Cleidiocarpon cavaleriei
- Cleidion lochmios
- Cleidion marginatum
- Cleidion veillonii
- Cocconerion minus
- Croton aubrevillei
- Croton coriaceus
- Croton dictyophlebodes
- Croton elegans, syn. of Croton ferrugineus
- Croton jatrophoides
- Croton kelantanicus
- Croton lucidus
- Croton phuquocensis
- Croton sarcocarpus
- Croton sordidus
- Croton stellulifer
- Croton sulcifructus
- Croton touranensis
- Crotonogyne strigosa
- Crotonogyne zenkeri
- Discoclaoxylon occidentale
- Drypetes afzelii
- Drypetes detersibilis
- Drypetes gerrardinoides
- Drypetes glabra
- Drypetes henriquesii
- Drypetes molundana
- Drypetes nervosa
- Drypetes obanensis
- Drypetes oxyodonta
- Drypetes palawanensis
- Drypetes pellegrinii
- Drypetes perakensis
- Drypetes preussii
- Drypetes sclerophylla
- Drypetes singroboensis
- Drypetes staudtii
- Drypetes wightii
- Erythrococca columnaris
- Euphorbia alfredii
- Euphorbia ambarivatoensis
- Euphorbia ambovombensis
- Euphorbia ammak
- Euphorbia analalavensis
- Euphorbia annamarieae
- Euphorbia apurimacensis
- Euphorbia atoto
- Euphorbia atrococca
- Euphorbia aureoviridiflora
- Euphorbia banae
- Euphorbia beharensis
- Euphorbia bemarahaensis
- Euphorbia biaculeata
- Euphorbia biselegans
- Euphorbia boissieri
- Euphorbia boiteaui
- Euphorbia bongolavensis
- Euphorbia bosseri
- Euphorbia bourgaeana
- Euphorbia bulbispina
- Euphorbia bwambensis
- Euphorbia capuronii
- Euphorbia cedrorum
- Euphorbia cremersii
- Euphorbia cussonioides
- Euphorbia delphinensis
- Euphorbia denisiana
- Euphorbia doloensis
- Euphorbia ensifolia
- Euphorbia famatamboay
- Euphorbia fianarantsoae
- Euphorbia gottlebei
- Euphorbia grandidieri
- Euphorbia hajhirensis
- Euphorbia handiensis
- Euphorbia hildebrandtii
- Euphorbia hofstaetteri
- Euphorbia itremensis
- Euphorbia jamesonii
- Euphorbia kuriensis
- Euphorbia leistneri
- Euphorbia leuconeura
- Euphorbia lividiflora
- Euphorbia lophogona
- Euphorbia mahabobokensis
- Euphorbia mahafalensis
- Euphorbia mangelsdorffii
- Euphorbia martinae
- Euphorbia melanocarpa
- Euphorbia meuleniana
- Euphorbia moratii
- Euphorbia namuskluftensis
- Euphorbia neoarborescens
- Euphorbia nereidum
- Euphorbia noxia
- Euphorbia obcordata
- Euphorbia otjipembana
- Euphorbia paulianii
- Euphorbia pellegrinii
- Euphorbia perrieri
- Euphorbia pervittata
- Euphorbia platyclada
- Euphorbia primulifolia
- Euphorbia randrianjohanyi
- Euphorbia rauhii
- Euphorbia retrospina
- Euphorbia rossii
- Euphorbia sachetiana
- Euphorbia sakarahaensis
- Euphorbia salota
- Euphorbia skottsbergii
- Euphorbia socotrana
- Euphorbia sparsiflora
- Euphorbia subpeltatophylla
- Euphorbia thouarsiana
- Euphorbia thulinii
- Euphorbia trichophylla
- Euphorbia uniglans
- Euphorbia vajravelui
- Euphorbia vezorum
- Euphorbia waringiae
- Euphorbia zakamenae
- Excoecaria benthamiana
- Grimmeodendron jamaicense
- Grossera elongata
- Gymnanthes glandulosa
- Hamilcoa zenkeri
- Hieronyma macrocarpa
- Homalanthus polyandrus, Kermadec poplar
- Jatropha bullockii
- Jatropha chamelensis
- Jatropha divaricata, wild oil nut
- Jatropha hildebrandtii
- Jatropha nana
- Joannesia princeps
- Lasiocroton fawcettii
- Lasiocroton harrisii
- Macaranga beillei
- Macaranga bicolor
- Macaranga caudatifolia
- Macaranga congestiflora
- Macaranga conglomerata
- Macaranga grandifolia
- Macaranga huahineensis
- Macaranga paxii
- Mallotus atrovirens
- Mallotus fuscescens
- Micrococca scariosa
- Mildbraedia carpinifolia
- Paranecepsia alchorneifolia
- Parodiodendron marginivillosum
- Pseudagrostistachys africana
- Ptychopyxis triradiata, synonym of Ptychopyxis bacciformis
- Pycnocoma littoralis
- Pycnocoma macrantha
- Reutealis trisperma
- Sapium aubrevillei
- Sapium bourgeaui
- Sapium luzonicum
- Sapium saltense
- Sapium triloculare
- Sebastiania alpina
- Sebastiania huallagensis
- Securinega flexuosa
- Sibangea pleioneura
- Suregada lithoxyla
- Tannodia swynnertonii
- Tapoides villamilii
- Tetrorchidium ulugurense
- Trigonostemon arboreus, synonym of Omphalea malayana
- Trigonostemon fragilis

Subspecies

- Croton longipedicellatus subsp. austrotanzanicus
- Euphorbia enterophora subsp. crassa
- Euphorbia famatamboay subsp. famatamboay
- Euphorbia famatamboay subsp. itampolensis
- Euphorbia orthoclada subsp. vepretorum

Varieties

- Drypetes natalensis var. leiogyna
- Drypetes usambarica var. mrimae
- Drypetes usambarica var. trichogyna
- Drypetes usambarica var. usambarica
- Euphorbia beharensis var. beharensis
- Euphorbia beharensis var. guillemetii
- Euphorbia beharensis var. squarrosa
- Euphorbia beharensis var. truncata
- Euphorbia bicompacta var. bicompacta
- Euphorbia boivinii var. minor
- Euphorbia celastroides var. laehiensis
- Euphorbia celastroides var. lorifolia
- Euphorbia celastroides var. stokesii
- Euphorbia cremersii var. cremersii
- Euphorbia cremersii var. rakotozafyi
- Euphorbia decaryi var. ampanihyensis
- Euphorbia decaryi var. spirosticha
- Euphorbia duranii var. ankaratrae
- Euphorbia francoisii var. crassicaulis
- Euphorbia lophogona var. lophogona
- Euphorbia mahafalensis var. xanthadenia
- Euphorbia milii var. roseana
- Euphorbia moratii var. antsingiensis
- Euphorbia moratii var. bemarahaensis
- Euphorbia moratii var. moratii
- Euphorbia moratii var. multiflora
- Euphorbia platyclada var. hardyi
- Euphorbia platyclada var. platyclada
- Euphorbia primulifolia var. primulifolia
- Mallotus oppositifolius var. lindicus
- Margaritaria anomala var. cheloniphorbe
- Ricinodendron heudelotii var. tomentellum

==== Hypericaceae ====
Species

- Hypericum acostanum
- Hypericum balfourii
- Hypericum callacallanum
- Hypericum fieriense
- Hypericum gnidiifolium
- Hypericum maguirei
- Hypericum matangense

==== Malpighiaceae ====
Species

- Bunchosia cauliflora
- Bunchosia jamaicensis
- Bunchosia linearifolia
- Hiraea perplexa
- Malpighia harrisii
- Malpighia obtusifolia
- Mezia tomentosa
- Ptilochaeta nudipes

Varieties

- Bunchosia hartwegiana var. brevisurcularis

==== Ochnaceae ====
Species

- Campylospermum amplectens
- Campylospermum letouzeyi
- Campylospermum scheffleri
- Fleurydora felicis
- Lophira alata, Azobe
- Ouratea cocleensis
- Ouratea insulae
- Ouratea quintasii
- Ouratea tumacoensis
- Quiina colonensis
- Sauvagesia brevipetala

Varieties

- Campylospermum vogelii var. molleri

==== Peraceae ====
- Chaetocarpus coriaceus

==== Phyllanthaceae ====
Species

- Amanoa bracteosa
- Amanoa strobilacea
- Andrachne schweinfurthii
- Antidesma obliquinervium, syn. of Antidesma montanum var. montanum
- Antidesma pyrifolium
- Antidesma subolivaceum
- Aporosa cardiosperma
- Aporosa lanceolata
- Baccaurea glabrifolia
- Baccaurea odoratissima
- Bridelia kurzii, syn. of Bridelia ovata
- Bridelia moonii
- Bridelia whitmorei
- Cleistanthus bracteosus
- Cleistanthus collinus
- Cleistanthus evrardii
- Cleistanthus ferrugineus
- Cleistanthus glandulosus
- Cleistanthus glaucus
- Cleistanthus malabaricus
- Cleistanthus parvifolius
- Cleistanthus petelotii
- Glochidion beccarii
- Glochidion bourdillonii
- Glochidion caloneurum
- Glochidion carrickii
- Glochidion cauliflorum
- Glochidion coronulatum
- Glochidion cupreum
- Glochidion insulare
- Glochidion johnstonei
- Glochidion longfieldiae
- Glochidion mehipitense
- Glochidion nadeaudii
- Glochidion rapaense
- Glochidion symingtonii
- Glochidion tenuistylum
- Hieronyma jamaicensis
- Meineckia capillipes
- Meineckia nguruensis
- Meineckia ovata
- Meineckia stipularis
- Phyllanthus acacioides
- Phyllanthus amieuensis
- Phyllanthus bathianus
- Phyllanthus bernieranus
- Phyllanthus caesius
- Phyllanthus cauliflorus
- Phyllanthus cryptophilus
- Phyllanthus dzumacensis
- Phyllanthus eximius
- Phyllanthus frazieri
- Phyllanthus gentryi
- Phyllanthus gigantifolius
- Phyllanthus indofischeri
- Phyllanthus koniamboensis
- Phyllanthus koumacensis
- Phyllanthus liesneri
- Phyllanthus maleolens
- Phyllanthus mananarensis
- Phyllanthus manicaensis
- Phyllanthus moorei
- Phyllanthus mouensis
- Phyllanthus nothisii
- Phyllanthus orientalis
- Phyllanthus parainduratus
- Phyllanthus peltatus
- Phyllanthus pilifer
- Phyllanthus platycalyx
- Phyllanthus poueboensis
- Phyllanthus poumensis
- Phyllanthus profusus
- Phyllanthus quintuplinervis
- Phyllanthus ramosii
- Phyllanthus rangoloakensis
- Phyllanthus sylvincola
- Phyllanthus tenuipedicellatus
- Phyllanthus torrentium
- Phyllanthus tuerckheimii
- Phyllanthus ukagurensis
- Phyllanthus unifoliatus
- Phyllanthus vakinankaratrae
- Phyllanthus valerii
- Phyllanthus volkensii
- Phyllanthus wingfieldii

Varieties

- Phyllanthus kaessneri var. kaessneri

==== Rhizophoraceae ====
- Anopyxis klaineana
- Carallia calycina
- Cassipourea fanshawei
- Cassipourea flanaganii
- Cassipourea hiotou
- Cassipourea thomassetii

==== Salicaceae ====
Species

- Abatia mexicana
- Abatia spicata
- Chosenia arbutifolia, synonym of Salix arbutifolia
- Populus ilicifolia, Tana River poplar
- Salix blinii
- Salix floridana, Florida willow
- Salix magnifica

Subspecies

- Populus mexicana subsp. mexicana

==== Other Malpighiales species ====
- Anthodiscus montanus
- Bonnetia bolivarensis
- Bonnetia celiae
- Bonnetia chimantensis
- Bonnetia cordifolia
- Bonnetia holostyla
- Bonnetia jauensis
- Bonnetia kathleenae
- Bonnetia lanceifolia
- Bonnetia maguireorum
- Bonnetia multinervia
- Bonnetia rubicunda
- Caryocar costaricense

=== Metteniusales ===
- Metteniusa huilensis

=== Myrtales ===
There are 357 species, 13 subspecies, and 11 varieties in the order Myrtales assessed as vulnerable.

==== Combretaceae ====
Species

- Anogeissus dhofarica
- Buchenavia hoehneana
- Combretum hartmannianum
- Combretum rochetianum
- Terminalia eddowesii
- Terminalia hecistocarpa
- Terminalia ivorensis, black afara
- Terminalia januariensis
- Terminalia kangeanensis
- Terminalia kuhlmannii
- Terminalia neotaliala
- Terminalia novocaledonica
- Terminalia pallida
- Terminalia parviflora
- Terminalia pellucida
- Terminalia reitzii
- Terminalia rerei

Subspecies

- Terminalia benzoin subsp. benzoin
- Terminalia microcarpa subsp. incana

==== Lythraceae ====
Species

- Ginoria nudiflora
- Lafoensia replicata
- Lagerstroemia anisoptera
- Lagerstroemia intermedia
- Nesaea pedicellata
- Nesaea petrensis
- Punica protopunica, pomegranate tree
- Rotala floribunda
- Rotala fontinalis
- Rotala smithii

Subspecies

- Nesaea triflora subsp. lupembensis

Varieties

- Nesaea parkeri var. longifolia

==== Melastomataceae ====
Species

- Aciotis asplundii, synonym of Aciotis rubricaulis
- Alloneuron dorrii
- Alloneuron ecuadorense
- Amphiblemma amoenum
- Amphiblemma lanceatum
- Amphiblemma letouzeyi
- Amphiblemma monticola
- Amphiblemma soyauxii
- Andesanthus gleasonianus, syn. Tibouchina gleasoniana
- Astronidium degeneri
- Axinaea pauciflora
- Axinaea sclerophylla
- Blakea campii
- Blakea harlingii
- Blakea hispida
- Blakea madisonii
- Blakea oldemanii
- Blakea pichinchensis
- Blakea rotundifolia
- Brachyotum azuayense
- Brachyotum benthamianum
- Brachyotum fictum
- Brachyotum fraternum
- Brachyotum gleasonii
- Brachyotum gracilescens
- Brachyotum harlingii
- Brachyotum incrassatum
- Brachyotum jamesonii
- Brachyotum johannes-julii
- Brachyotum rugosum
- Brachyotum russatum
- Bucquetia nigritella
- Centronia brachycera
- Centronia laurifolia
- Centronia mutisii
- Centronia peruviana
- Chaetogastra campii, syn. Tibouchina campii
- Chaetogastra oroensis, syn. Tibouchina oroensis
- Clidemia acostae
- Clidemia asplundii
- Clidemia imparilis
- Clidemia purpurea
- Conostegia chiriquensis
- Conostegia superba
- Dissotis bamendae
- Dissotis pobeguinii, Oueleba rose
- Graffenrieda caudata
- Graffenrieda harlingii
- Graffenrieda trichanthera
- Gravesia pulchra
- Henriettea punctata
- Henriettea squamata
- Henriettella ininiensis
- Huilaea ecuadorensis
- Huilaea occidentalis
- Leandra pastazana
- Memecylon bequaertii
- Memecylon candidum
- Memecylon cinereum
- Memecylon clarkeanum
- Memecylon cogniauxii
- Memecylon dasyanthum
- Memecylon floridum
- Memecylon fragrans
- Memecylon grande
- Memecylon hookeri
- Memecylon hullettii
- Memecylon kunstleri
- Memecylon lawsonii
- Memecylon leucanthum
- Memecylon macrocarpum
- Memecylon myrtilloides
- Memecylon ovoideum
- Memecylon rostratum
- Memecylon rotundatum
- Memecylon royenii
- Memecylon sylvaticum
- Memecylon teitense
- Memecylon urceolatum
- Memecylon varians
- Memecylon verruculosum
- Memecylon wallichii
- Meriania almedae
- Meriania amplexicaulis
- Meriania cuneifolia
- Meriania furvanthera
- Meriania grandiflora
- Meriania kirkbridei
- Meriania pastazana
- Meriania pichinchensis
- Meriania rigida
- Miconia aequatorialis
- Miconia aligera
- Miconia alpina
- Miconia ayacuchensis
- Miconia barclayana
- Miconia bipatrialis
- Miconia bolivarensis
- Miconia brevistylis
- Miconia caelata
- Miconia cajanumana
- Miconia calignosa
- Miconia calophylla
- Miconia campii
- Miconia castillensis
- Miconia cosangensis
- Miconia crebribullata
- Miconia dapsiliflora
- Miconia demissifolia
- Miconia dissimulans
- Miconia explicita
- Miconia floccosa
- Miconia gibba
- Miconia gonioclada
- Miconia grayana
- Miconia griffisii
- Miconia hexamera
- Miconia huigrensis
- Miconia hylophila
- Miconia idiogena
- Miconia imitans
- Miconia innata
- Miconia jorgensenii
- Miconia lachnoclada
- Miconia laxa
- Miconia mediocris
- Miconia namandensis
- Miconia oellgaardii
- Miconia pastazana
- Miconia penningtonii
- Miconia perelegans
- Miconia pernettifolia
- Miconia pisinniflora
- Miconia poortmannii
- Miconia protuberans
- Miconia renneri
- Miconia rimbachii
- Miconia santaritensis
- Miconia seticaulis
- Miconia setulosa
- Miconia sodiroi
- Miconia sparrei
- Miconia stenophylla
- Miconia suborbicularis
- Miconia tephrodes
- Miconia zamorensis
- Mouriri panamensis
- Ossaea boekei
- Ossaea sparrei
- Spathandra barteri
- Tetrazygia elegans
- Topobea asplundii
- Topobea brevibractea
- Topobea pascoensis
- Triolena pedemontana
- Warneckea amaniensis
- Warneckea memecyloides
- Warneckea mouririifolia

Subspecies

- Meriania cuneifolia subsp. cuneifolia
- Meriania cuneifolia subsp. subandina
- Meriania drakei subsp. chontalensis
- Meriania drakei subsp. drakei
- Miconia monzoniensis subsp. cuzcoensis
- Miconia thaminantha subsp. thaminantha

==== Myrtaceae ====
Species

- Archirhodomyrtus paitensis
- Arillastrum gummiferum
- Calycolpus legrandii
- Campomanesia anemonea
- Campomanesia aromatica
- Campomanesia hirsuta
- Cloezia aquarum
- Curitiba prismatica
- Decaspermum arfakense
- Eucalyptus aggregata
- Eucalyptus albens
- Eucalyptus albida
- Eucalyptus alipes
- Eucalyptus angulosa
- Eucalyptus angustissima
- Eucalyptus annettae
- Eucalyptus annulata
- Eucalyptus arenicola
- Eucalyptus armillata
- Eucalyptus aromaphloia
- Eucalyptus articulata
- Eucalyptus baueriana
- Eucalyptus bensonii
- Eucalyptus blakelyi
- Eucalyptus brandiana
- Eucalyptus bridgesiana
- Eucalyptus buprestium
- Eucalyptus burracoppinensis
- Eucalyptus cadens
- Eucalyptus calcicola
- Eucalyptus cambageana
- Eucalyptus camfieldii
- Eucalyptus captiosa
- Eucalyptus cephalocarpa
- Eucalyptus cerasiformis
- Eucalyptus cladocalyx
- Eucalyptus clivicola
- Eucalyptus cneorifolia
- Eucalyptus conferta
- Eucalyptus conica
- Eucalyptus crucis
- Eucalyptus cyanophylla
- Eucalyptus dawsonii
- Eucalyptus deglupta
- Eucalyptus dielsii
- Eucalyptus diminuta
- Eucalyptus diversifolia
- Eucalyptus dumosa
- Eucalyptus extensa
- Eucalyptus falciformis
- Eucalyptus farinosa
- Eucalyptus fasciculosa
- Eucalyptus flocktoniae
- Eucalyptus fracta
- Eucalyptus georgei
- Eucalyptus gittinsii
- Eucalyptus glaucina
- Eucalyptus gomphocephala
- Eucalyptus goniocalyx
- Eucalyptus haemastoma
- Eucalyptus halophila
- Eucalyptus hawkeri
- Eucalyptus hebetifolia
- Eucalyptus ignorabilis
- Eucalyptus indurata
- Eucalyptus infera
- Eucalyptus jutsonii
- Eucalyptus kartzoffiana
- Eucalyptus kessellii
- Eucalyptus kochii
- Eucalyptus lane-poolei
- Eucalyptus largiflorens
- Eucalyptus latens
- Eucalyptus leptophylla
- Eucalyptus leucoxylon
- Eucalyptus litoralis
- Eucalyptus longifolia
- Eucalyptus loxophleba
- Eucalyptus luehmanniana
- Eucalyptus macarthurii
- Eucalyptus macrocarpa
- Eucalyptus magnificata
- Eucalyptus mckieana
- Eucalyptus mcquoidii
- Eucalyptus megacornuta
- Eucalyptus melliodora
- Eucalyptus merrickiae
- Eucalyptus mitchelliana
- Eucalyptus moderata
- Eucalyptus moluccana
- Eucalyptus newbeyi
- Eucalyptus nicholii
- Eucalyptus nova-anglica
- Eucalyptus nutans
- Eucalyptus obtusiflora
- Eucalyptus ovata
- Eucalyptus phaenophylla
- Eucalyptus phenax
- Eucalyptus pileata
- Eucalyptus pleurocarpa
- Eucalyptus pluricaulis
- Eucalyptus populnea
- Eucalyptus porosa
- Eucalyptus praetermissa
- Eucalyptus pumila
- Eucalyptus pyriformis
- Eucalyptus quaerenda
- Eucalyptus relicta
- Eucalyptus risdonii
- Eucalyptus sabulosa
- Eucalyptus salmonophloia
- Eucalyptus semota
- Eucalyptus sheathiana
- Eucalyptus sporadica
- Eucalyptus squamosa
- Eucalyptus steedmanii
- Eucalyptus subangusta
- Eucalyptus suberea
- Eucalyptus suggrandis
- Eucalyptus thamnoides
- Eucalyptus tumida
- Eucalyptus uncinata
- Eucalyptus varia
- Eucalyptus vegrandis
- Eucalyptus vesiculosa
- Eucalyptus virginea
- Eucalyptus wandoo
- Eucalyptus wimmerensis
- Eucalyptus xanthonema
- Eugenia alaotrensis
- Eugenia albimarginata
- Eugenia amatenangensis
- Eugenia ambanizanensis
- Eugenia amoena
- Eugenia arthroopoda
- Eugenia baileyi
- Eugenia basilaris
- Eugenia belemitana
- Eugenia belladerensis
- Eugenia benjamina, synonym of Syzygium perryae
- Eugenia boliviana
- Eugenia botequimensis
- Eugenia brachythrix, synonym of Eugenia biflora
- Eugenia brownei
- Eugenia bumelioides
- Eugenia bunchosiifolia
- Eugenia burkilliana, synonym of Syzygium burkillianum
- Eugenia cacuminum
- Eugenia cantuana
- Eugenia capulioides
- Eugenia cararensis
- Eugenia cassinoides
- Eugenia catingiflora
- Eugenia caudata, synonym of Syzygium urophyllum
- Eugenia clarensis
- Eugenia conjuncta
- Eugenia cordifoliolata
- Eugenia corusca
- Eugenia cowanii
- Eugenia crenularis
- Eugenia cydoniifolia
- Eugenia cymatodes
- Eugenia cyrtophylloides, synonym of Syzygium cyrtophylloides
- Eugenia delicatissima
- Eugenia dewevrei
- Eugenia dictyophylla
- Eugenia dusenii
- Eugenia echinulata
- Eugenia eggersii
- Eugenia elliotii
- Eugenia esteliensis
- Eugenia fernandopoana
- Eugenia fulva
- Eugenia gandhii
- Eugenia goniocalyx, synonym of Syzygium cameronum
- Eugenia goviala
- Eugenia hammelii
- Eugenia haniffii, synonym of Syzygium haniffii
- Eugenia harrisii
- Eugenia hartshornii
- Eugenia hatschbachii
- Eugenia heterochroa
- Eugenia horizontalis
- Eugenia iantarensis
- Eugenia incanescens
- Eugenia inirebensis
- Eugenia kaalensis
- Eugenia laeteviridis
- Eugenia lamprophylla
- Eugenia liesneri
- Eugenia lineolata
- Eugenia lotoides
- Eugenia mackeeana
- Eugenia malacantha
- Eugenia malcomberi
- Eugenia manomboensis
- Eugenia marlierioides
- Eugenia membranifolia
- Eugenia microcarpa, synonym of Eugenia pisiformis
- Eugenia mufindiensis
- Eugenia ngadimaniana, synonym of Syzygium ngadimanianum
- Eugenia nigrita
- Eugenia nipensis
- Eugenia nompa
- Eugenia nosibensis
- Eugenia noumeensis
- Eugenia ogoouensis
- Eugenia pachychlamys
- Eugenia pallidula, synonym of Syzygium pallidulum
- Eugenia pantagensis
- Eugenia percrenata
- Eugenia persicifolia
- Eugenia picardiae
- Eugenia piresiana
- Eugenia plumbea, synonym of Syzygium plumbeum
- Eugenia pluricymosa
- Eugenia pobeguinii
- Eugenia porphyrantha, synonym of Syzygium porphyranthum
- Eugenia pseudoclaviflora, synonym of Syzygium pseudoclaviflorum
- Eugenia pulcherrima
- Eugenia pyrifera
- Eugenia quadrata, synonym of Syzygium quadratum
- Eugenia quercetorum
- Eugenia ranomafana
- Eugenia rekoi
- Eugenia rhomboidea, synonym of Syzygium rhomboideum
- Eugenia riosiae
- Eugenia rivulorum
- Eugenia rottleriana
- Eugenia rotundata
- Eugenia rufofulva
- Eugenia sarapiquensis
- Eugenia sargentii
- Eugenia schatzii
- Eugenia schulziana
- Eugenia sclerocalyx
- Eugenia siltepecana
- Eugenia sinaloae
- Eugenia sp. nov. 'calcarea'
- Eugenia stewardsonii
- Eugenia subreticulata
- Eugenia sumbensis
- Eugenia swettenhamiana, synonym of Syzygium swettenhamianum
- Eugenia tabouensis
- Eugenia tamaensis
- Eugenia tenuipedunculata
- Eugenia tepuiensis
- Eugenia teresae
- Eugenia thouvenotiana
- Eugenia tiumanensis, synonym of Syzygium tiumanense
- Eugenia toxanatolica
- Eugenia umbonata
- Eugenia woodburyana
- Eugenia xanthoxyloides
- Eugenia yautepecana
- Eugenia zygophylla
- Gossia conspicua
- Kanakomyrtus myrtopsidoides
- Kunzea triregensis
- Lophomyrtus obcordata
- Melaleuca buseana
- Melaleuca nanophylla
- Metrosideros engleriana
- Metrosideros kermadecensis
- Metrosideros microphylla
- Metrosideros polymorpha
- Mosiera androsiana
- Mosiera cabanasensis
- Mosiera moana
- Mosiera moensis
- Myrceugenia bracteosa
- Myrceugenia foveolata
- Myrceugenia franciscensis
- Myrceugenia hoehnei
- Myrceugenia kleinii
- Myrceugenia pilotantha
- Myrcia aethusa
- Myrcia anceps
- Myrcia antillana
- Myrcia bergiana
- Myrcia bicolor
- Myrcia calcicola
- Myrcia capitata
- Myrcia carioca
- Myrcia clarendonensis
- Myrcia congestiflora
- Myrcia diaphana
- Myrcia dichrophylla
- Myrcia dryadica
- Myrcia eugenioides
- Myrcia eumecephylla
- Myrcia fasciata
- Myrcia felisbertii
- Myrcia floridissima
- Myrcia grandiflora, synonym of Myrcia pubipetala
- Myrcia hexasticha
- Myrcia insigniflora
- Myrcia insularis
- Myrcia intonsa
- Myrcia isaiana
- Myrcia lacunosa
- Myrcia longicalyptrata
- Myrcia lozanoi
- Myrcia luquillensis
- Myrcia maximiliana
- Myrcia megistophylla
- Myrcia micropetala
- Myrcia neobuxifolia
- Myrcia neocapitata
- Myrcia neodimorpha
- Myrcia neoglabra
- Myrcia neosmithii
- Myrcia nodosa
- Myrcia nummularia
- Myrcia obversa
- Myrcia ochroides
- Myrcia ovata
- Myrcia parvifolia
- Myrcia perforata
- Myrcia petricola
- Myrcia pileata
- Myrcia proencana
- Myrcia pseudomarlierea
- Myrcia pubipetala
- Myrcia rufotomentosa
- Myrcia rupicola
- Myrcia salzmannii
- Myrcia sintenisii
- Myrcia spathulifolia
- Myrcia stricta
- Myrcia subavenia
- Myrcia subterminalis
- Myrcia sucrei
- Myrcia tenuifolia
- Myrcia tenuipes
- Myrcia tenuivenosa
- Myrcia tetraphylla
- Myrcia thyrsoidea
- Myrcia tricona
- Myrcia trimera
- Myrcia ubatubana
- Myrcia umbelliformis
- Myrcia uncinata
- Myrcia undulata
- Myrcia vauthieriana
- Myrcia websteri
- Myrcia wilsonii
- Myrcia yasuniana
- Myrcianthes callicoma
- Myrcianthes quinqueloba
- Myrciaria silveirana
- Neomitranthes pereireana
- Pimenta cainitoides
- Pimenta haitiensis
- Pimenta obscura
- Pleurocalyptus austrocaledonicus
- Plinia cerrocampanensis
- Plinia cordifolia
- Plinia cubensis
- Plinia cuspidata
- Plinia edulis
- Plinia formosa, synonym of Myrciaria formosa
- Plinia panamensis
- Plinia punctata
- Psidium dictyophyllum
- Psidium minutifolium
- Psidium reversum
- Psidium rostratum
- Psidium rutidocarpum
- Rhodamnia glauca
- Rhodamnia waigeoensis
- Siphoneugena delicata
- Siphoneugena kuhlmannii
- Siphoneugena occidentalis
- Syzygium arcanum
- Syzygium avene
- Syzygium bakoense
- Syzygium balansae
- Syzygium bartonii
- Syzygium bataanense
- Syzygium baudouinii
- Syzygium benthamianum
- Syzygium brittonianum
- Syzygium calcicola
- Syzygium calleryanum
- Syzygium candelabriforme
- Syzygium caryophyllatum
- Syzygium caryophylliflorum
- Syzygium celebicum
- Syzygium chloroleucum
- Syzygium clavellatum
- Syzygium condensatum
- Syzygium congestum
- Syzygium cornuflorum
- Syzygium costulatum
- Syzygium crassissimum
- Syzygium curranii
- Syzygium curtiflorum
- Syzygium danguyanum
- Syzygium dasyphyllum
- Syzygium densiflorum
- Syzygium elegans
- Syzygium erythranthum
- Syzygium everettii
- Syzygium firmum, synonym of Syzygium grande
- Syzygium georgeae
- Syzygium germainii
- Syzygium gilletii
- Syzygium glomeruliferum
- Syzygium griseum
- Syzygium guillauminii
- Syzygium halophilum
- Syzygium hemsleyanum
- Syzygium hypsipetes
- Syzygium iliasii
- Syzygium incrassatum
- Syzygium insulare
- Syzygium intumescens
- Syzygium iteophyllum
- Syzygium jaffrei
- Syzygium jaherii
- Syzygium kabaense
- Syzygium karimatense
- Syzygium koniamboense
- Syzygium korthalsianum
- Syzygium kriegeri
- Syzygium kuebiniense
- Syzygium leptoneurum
- Syzygium mainitense
- Syzygium makul
- Syzygium malabaricum
- Syzygium marginatum
- Syzygium masukuense
- Syzygium melliodorum
- Syzygium merrittianum
- Syzygium micranthum
- Syzygium mindorense
- Syzygium multiglandulosum
- Syzygium myrtilloides
- Syzygium naiadum
- Syzygium neesianum
- Syzygium neocaledonicum
- Syzygium nitidum
- Syzygium oliganthum
- Syzygium padangense
- Syzygium pallens
- Syzygium paniense
- Syzygium pergamaceum
- Syzygium phanerophlebium
- Syzygium philippinense
- Syzygium pluviatile
- Syzygium praetermissum
- Syzygium propinquum
- Syzygium pterocalyx
- Syzygium pterophorum
- Syzygium pyriforme
- Syzygium rhizophorum
- Syzygium rivulare
- Syzygium robertii
- Syzygium rotundifolium
- Syzygium sambogense
- Syzygium sandwicense
- Syzygium soepadmoi
- Syzygium sorongense
- Syzygium stelechanthum
- Syzygium stocksii
- Syzygium striatulum
- Syzygium subcaudatum
- Syzygium subisense
- Syzygium subscandens
- Syzygium triphlebium
- Syzygium tubiflorum
- Syzygium tympananthum
- Syzygium urdanetense
- Syzygium vaupelii
- Syzygium verniciflorum
- Syzygium vidalianum
- Syzygium viriosum
- Syzygium waterhousei
- Syzygium wrightii
- Syzygium xanthostemifolium
- Tristaniopsis lucida
- Tristaniopsis pentandra
- Tristaniopsis reticulata
- Tristaniopsis sam-mannanii
- Tristaniopsis yateensis
- Xanthomyrtus lanceolata
- Xanthostemon bracteatus
- Xanthostemon macrophyllus
- Xanthostemon melanoxylon
- Xanthostemon oppositifolius
- Xanthostemon philippinensis
- Xanthostemon sulfureus
- Xanthostemon verdugonianus

Subspecies

- Syzygium cordifolium subsp. cordifolium
- Syzygium cordifolium subsp. spissum
- Syzygium micklethwaitii subsp. micklethwaitii
- Syzygium micklethwaitii subsp. subcordatum

Varieties

- Campomanesia schlechtendaliana var. schlechtendaliana
- Eugenia harrisii var. harrisii
- Eugenia mandevillensis var. mandevillensis
- Eugenia mandevillensis var. perratonii
- Metrosideros polymorpha var. newellii
- Myrcia splendens var. chrysocoma
- Pimenta pseudocaryophyllus var. hoehnei
- Pimenta racemosa var. hispaniolensis
- Pimenta racemosa var. ozua
- Psidium rufum var. widgrenianum

==== Onagraceae ====
- Fuchsia campii
- Fuchsia cyrtandroides
- Fuchsia harlingii
- Fuchsia pilaloensis
- Fuchsia steyermarkii
- Fuchsia summa
- Ludwigia anastomosans

==== Other Myrtales species ====
- Axinandra zeylanica
- Qualea calantha
- Rhynchocalyx lawsonioides
- Trapa maleevii, Maleev's water-chestnut

=== Oxalidales ===
==== Cephalotaceae ====
- Cephalotus follicularis, Australian pitcher plant

=== Piperales ===
There are 24 species in the order Piperales assessed as vulnerable.

==== Chloranthaceae ====
- Hedyosmum mexicanum
- Hedyosmum purpurascens

==== Piperaceae ====
- Peperomia choritana
- Peperomia crispa
- Peperomia graveolens
- Peperomia inconspicua
- Peperomia millei
- Peperomia persulcata
- Peperomia porphyridea
- Peperomia rupicola
- Peperomia scutellariifolia
- Peperomia simplex
- Peperomia thienii
- Piper hylebates
- Piper hylophilum
- Piper lineatipilosum
- Piper napo-pastazanum
- Piper nebuligaudens
- Piper pedicellatum
- Piper schuppii
- Piper seychellarum, Seychelles pepper
- Piper sodiroi
- Piper subaduncum
- Piper supernum

=== Plumbaginales ===
- Armeria sampaioi
- Dyerophytum pendulum
- Dyerophytum socotranum
- Limonium duriaei
- Limonium ornatum
- Limonium palmyrense
- Limonium perezii

=== Podostemales ===
- Apinagia boliviana
- Castelnavia monandra
- Castelnavia noveloi
- Dalzellia ranongensis
- Diamantina lombardii
- Farmeria metzgerioides
- Hanseniella heterophylla
- Ledermanniella aloides
- Ledermanniella bifurcata
- Ledermanniella boumiensis
- Ledermanniella cristata
- Ledermanniella kamerunensis
- Ledermanniella schlechteri
- Ledermanniella warmingiana
- Macropodiella hallaei
- Macropodiella heteromorpha
- Podostemum saldanhanum
- Polypleurum filifolium
- Rhyncholacis nobilis
- Saxicolella laciniata
- Saxicolella nana
- Willisia selaginoides

=== Proteales ===
==== Elaeagnaceae ====
- Elaeagnus mollis
- Elaeagnus tarokoensis

==== Platanaceae ====
- Platanus kerrii

==== Proteaceae ====
Species

- Beauprea balansae
- Beauprea crassifolia
- Euplassa isernii
- Euplassa occidentalis
- Grevillea nepwiensis
- Helicia acutifolia
- Helicia australasica
- Helicia calocoma
- Helicia grandifolia
- Helicia neglecta
- Helicia peekelii
- Helicia retusa
- Helicia rostrata
- Heliciopsis cockburnii
- Heliciopsis rufidula
- Kermadecia pronyensis
- Leucadendron argenteum
- Macadamia neurophylla
- Mimetes arboreus
- Mimetes chrysanthus, golden pagoda
- Protea curvata
- Protea laetans
- Protea lanceolata
- Roupala loxensis
- Roupala pinnata
- Roupala sphenophyllum

Subspecies

- Protea aurea subsp. potbergensis

=== Ranunculales ===
There are 36 species, one subspecies, and one variety in the order Ranunculales assessed as vulnerable.

==== Meliosmaceae ====
- Meliosma sirensis
- Meliosma youngii

==== Berberidaceae ====
- Berberis candidula
- Berberis dryandriphylla
- Berberis iliensis
- Berberis johannis
- Berberis pindilicensis
- Berberis silvicola
- Berberis taronensis
- Berberis woomungensis
- Berberis xanthophloea
- Dysosma aurantiocaulis
- Dysosma tsayuensis
- Dysosma veitchii
- Dysosma versipellis
- Epimedium ecalcaratum
- Epimedium flavum
- Epimedium parvifolium
- Epimedium simplicifolium
- Epimedium truncatum
- Epimedium zhushanense
- Mahonia conferta
- Mahonia decipiens
- Mahonia microphylla
- Mahonia oiwakensis

==== Menispermaceae ====
Species

- Albertisia capituliflora
- Albertisia glabra
- Cissampelos nigrescens
- Disciphania tricaudata
- Hyperbaena allenii
- Hyperbaena jalcomulcensis
- Hyperbaena lindmanii
- Hyperbaena undulata

Subspecies

- Anisocycla blepharosepala subsp. tanzaniensis

Varieties

- Cissampelos nigrescens var. nigrescens

==== Papaveraceae ====
- Corydalis filistipes
- Corydalis tarkiensis, Tarkian corydalis
- Papaver laestadianum
- Papaver talyshense, Talyshian poppy

==== Ranunculaceae ====
- Aconitum corsicum
- Aconitum violaceum
- Ranunculus kykkoensis
- Ranunculus schweinfurthii
- Ranunculus weyleri

=== Rosales ===
==== Brunelliaceae ====
- Brunellia antioquensis
- Brunellia boqueronensis
- Brunellia cayambensis
- Brunellia macrophylla
- Brunellia occidentalis
- Brunellia racemifera

==== Cannabaceae ====
- Celtis balansae
- Celtis lindheimeri, Lindheimer hackberry
- Celtis luzonica
- Trema discolor

==== Cecropiaceae ====
Species

- Cecropia maxima
- Cecropia tubulosa
- Cecropia utcubambana
- Cecropia velutinella
- Coussapoa curranii
- Coussapoa floccosa
- Pourouma oraria

Subspecies

- Pourouma hirsutipetiolata subsp. hirsutipetiolata
- Pourouma melinonii subsp. glabrata

==== Connaraceae ====
Species

- Connarus agamae
- Jollydora glandulosa
- Jollydora pierrei

Varieties

- Connarus williamsii var. williamsii
- Ellipanthus beccarii var. beccarii

==== Cunoniaceae ====
Species

- Codia albifrons
- Codia ferruginea
- Codia jaffrei
- Cunonia bopopensis
- Cunonia cerifera
- Cunonia deplanchei
- Geissois balansae
- Geissois lanceolata
- Geissois velutina
- Pancheria communis
- Pterophylla arguta
- Pterophylla baehniana
- Pterophylla mammea
- Spiraeanthemum pulleanum
- Weinmannia apurimacensis
- Weinmannia costulata
- Weinmannia cymbifolia
- Weinmannia davidsonii
- Weinmannia descendens
- Weinmannia glomerata
- Weinmannia ilutepuiensis
- Weinmannia loxensis
- Weinmannia portlandiana
- Weinmannia purpurea
- Weinmannia rapensis, synonym of Pterophylla rapensis
- Weinmannia spiraeoides
- Weinmannia stenocarpa
- Weinmannia tolimensis
- Weinmannia ulei
- Weinmannia yungasensis

Varieties

- Weinmannia auriculata var. dryadifolia
- Weinmannia laurina var. pseudolaurina
- Weinmannia microphylla var. tenuior

==== Moraceae ====
Species

- Artocarpus altissimus
- Artocarpus anisophyllus
- Artocarpus excelsus
- Artocarpus gongshanensis
- Artocarpus horridus
- Artocarpus longifolius
- Artocarpus lowii
- Artocarpus nobilis
- Artocarpus parvus
- Artocarpus reticulatus
- Artocarpus rubrosoccatus
- Artocarpus sarawakensis
- Artocarpus subrotundifolius
- Artocarpus tamaran
- Artocarpus tomentosulus
- Artocarpus xanthocarpus
- Dorstenia astyanactis
- Dorstenia holstii
- Dorstenia prorepens
- Dorstenia socotrana
- Dorstenia tenuiradiata
- Dorstenia ulugurensis
- Dorstenia zambesiaca
- Ficus abscondita
- Ficus aguaraguensis, synonym of Ficus cuatrecasasiana
- Ficus baccaureoides
- Ficus bakeri
- Ficus bizanae
- Ficus bojeri
- Ficus boninsimae
- Ficus burretiana
- Ficus calyptroceras
- Ficus carautana
- Ficus costata
- Ficus crassicosta
- Ficus cyathistipuloides
- Ficus dalhousiae
- Ficus diamantiphylla
- Ficus faulkneriana
- Ficus inaequifolia
- Ficus lacunata
- Ficus laevicarpa
- Ficus laureola
- Ficus longistipulata
- Ficus mexiae, synonym of Ficus enormis
- Ficus mutabilis
- Ficus novae-georgiae
- Ficus pakkensis
- Ficus parvibracteata
- Ficus praestans
- Ficus pulchella
- Ficus rubrosyce
- Ficus subfulva
- Ficus sulcata
- Ficus supperforata
- Ficus ternatana
- Ficus torrentium
- Ficus tovarensis
- Ficus virescens
- Ficus vrieseana
- Milicia regia
- Naucleopsis chiguila
- Pseudolmedia hirtula

Subspecies

- Brosimum utile subsp. darienense, Cow tree
- Ficus chlamydocarpa subsp. fernandesiana
- Ficus reflexa subsp. sechellensis
- Ficus tremula subsp. acuta

Varieties

- Dorstenia holstii var. longistipulata
- Dorstenia tayloriana var. tayloriana

==== Pittosporaceae ====
Species

- Pittosporum artense
- Pittosporum collinum
- Pittosporum dallii, Dalls pittosporum
- Pittosporum fairchildii, Fairchild's kohuhu
- Pittosporum gatopense
- Pittosporum goetzei
- Pittosporum linearifolium
- Pittosporum orohenense
- Pittosporum paniense
- Pittosporum pauciflorum
- Pittosporum silamense
- Pittosporum terminalioides

Subspecies

- Pittosporum senacia subsp. wrightii

==== Rhamnaceae ====
Species

- Alphitonia ponderosa
- Auerodendron jamaicense
- Auerodendron northropianum
- Bathiorhamnus capuronii
- Bathiorhamnus cryptophorus
- Bathiorhamnus dentatus
- Ceanothus impressus
- Colubrina alluaudii
- Colubrina nicholsonii
- Colubrina obscura
- Colubrina verrucosa
- Frangula circumscissa
- Frangula surotatensis
- Karwinskia umbellata
- Karwinskia venturae
- Lasiodiscus rozeirae
- Pomaderris hamiltonii
- Reynosia affinis
- Reynosia regia
- Rhamnella gilgitica
- Sarcomphalus cyclocardius
- Ventilago tinctoria
- Ventilago vanuatuana

Subspecies

- Lasiodiscus mildbraedii subsp. ferrugineus

==== Rosaceae ====
Species

- Amygdalus bucharica
- Aphanes cotopaxiensis
- Aria hibernica, Irish whitebeam
- Bencomia exstipulata
- Chamaemeles coriacea
- Cliffortia arborea
- Dendriopoterium pulidoi
- Kageneckia lanceolata
- Lachemilla aequatoriensis, synonym of Alchemilla aequatoriensis
- Lachemilla angustata
- Lachemilla jamesonii, synonym of Alchemilla jamesonii
- Lachemilla rupestris, synonym of Alchemilla rupestris
- Lachemilla sprucei, synonym of Alchemilla sprucei
- Malus sieversii
- Photinia lasiogyna
- Photinia lasiopetala
- Polylepis crista-galli
- Polylepis hieronymi
- Polylepis incana
- Polylepis lanuginosa
- Polylepis microphylla
- Polylepis multijuga
- Polylepis neglecta
- Polylepis pauta
- Polylepis pepei
- Polylepis racemosa
- Polylepis reticulata
- Polylepis rugulosa
- Polylepis subsericans
- Potentilla delphinensis
- Prunus africana, red stinkwood
- Prunus korshinskyi
- Prunus laxinervis
- Prunus mirabilis
- Prunus ramburii
- Prunus subglabra
- Prunus walkeri
- Pyrus complexa, mixed pear
- Pyrus serikensis
- Rosa zangezura, Zangezurian rose
- Rubus azuayensis
- Rubus laegaardii
- Sorbus amabilis
- Sorbus anglica, English whitebeam
- Sorbus arranensis, Arran whitebeam
- Sorbus badensis
- Sorbus eminens, round-leaved whitebeam
- Sorbus franconica
- Sorbus heilingensis
- Sorbus pseudofennica, Arran service-tree
- Sorbus pseudothuringiaca
- Sorbus subcordata
- Sorbus subcuneata, Somerset whitebeam
- Sorbus vexans, bloody whitebeam

Subspecies

- Lyonothamnus floribundus subsp. asplenifolius, Santa Cruz Island ironwood
- Lyonothamnus floribundus subsp. floribundus, Catalina ironwood
- Polylepis besseri subsp. besseri
- Polylepis besseri subsp. incarum
- Polylepis besseri subsp. subtusalbida
- Polylepis racemosa subsp. lanata
- Polylepis racemosa subsp. triacontandra
- Polylepis tomentella subsp. incanoides
- Prunus lusitanica subsp. hixa

Varieties

- Prunus grisea var. tomentosa

==== Ulmaceae ====
- Phyllostylon orthopterum
- Ulmus elongata
- Ulmus wallichiana
- Zelkova carpinifolia

==== Urticaceae ====
Species

- Neraudia melastomifolia
- Pilea myriophylla
- Pilea napoana
- Pilea schimpfii
- Pipturus schaeferi

Varieties

- Pipturus argenteus var. argenteus

=== Sapindales ===
There are 345 species, ten subspecies, and 14 varieties in the order Sapindales assessed as vulnerable.

==== Aceraceae ====
Species

- Acer duplicatoserratum
- Acer miaotaiense

Subspecies

- Acer amplum subsp. catalpifolium
- Acer miyabei subsp. miaotaiense
- Acer negundo subsp. mexicanum

Varieties

- Acer oblongum var. microcarpum

==== Anacardiaceae ====
Species

- Abrahamia capuronii
- Abrahamia deflexa
- Abrahamia delphinensis
- Abrahamia humbertii
- Abrahamia itremoensis
- Abrahamia latifolia
- Abrahamia lecomtei
- Abrahamia littoralis
- Abrahamia sambiranensis
- Abrahamia turkii
- Antrocaryon micraster, antrocaryon
- Buchanania lanceolata
- Buchanania platyneura
- Campnosperma zeylanica, as Campnosperma zeylanicum
- Comocladia cordata
- Euroschinus aoupiniensis
- Euroschinus jaffrei
- Faguetia falcata
- Gluta curtisii
- Gluta papuana
- Koordersiodendron pinnatum
- Loxopterygium grisebachii
- Mangifera altissima
- Mangifera austro-indica
- Mangifera dewildei
- Mangifera flava
- Mangifera macrocarpa
- Mangifera minutifolia
- Mangifera orophila
- Mangifera pajang
- Mangifera pedicellata
- Mangifera pentandra
- Mangifera rufocostata, Asem kiat
- Mangifera similis
- Mangifera subsessilifolia
- Mangifera sumbawaensis
- Mangifera swintonioides
- Mangifera transversalis
- Mangifera zeylanica
- Mauria killipii
- Mauria trichothyrsa
- Melanochyla bullata
- Melanochyla caesia
- Melanochyla longipetiolata
- Melanochyla minutiflora
- Melanochyla tomentosa
- Operculicarya hirsutissima
- Pistacia cucphuongensis
- Pistacia mexicana
- Rhus coriaria
- Rhus sp. A
- Schinopsis haenkeana
- Schinus venturi
- Sclerocarya gillettii
- Semecarpus angustifolius
- Semecarpus calcicola
- Semecarpus gardneri
- Semecarpus marginata
- Semecarpus moonii
- Semecarpus nigro-viridis
- Semecarpus obovata
- Semecarpus parvifolia
- Semecarpus paucinervius
- Semecarpus pubescens, velvet badulla
- Semecarpus subpeltata
- Semecarpus trengganuensis
- Semecarpus walkeri
- Tapirira bethanniana
- Tapirira chimalapana
- Thyrsodium herrerense
- Trichoscypha cavalliensis
- Trichoscypha engong
- Trichoscypha mannii

Varieties

- Ozoroa reticulata var. nyasica
- Pseudospondias microcarpa var. hirsuta
- Schinus gracilipes var. pilosus
- Schinus longifolius var. paraguariensis

==== Burseraceae ====
Species

- Aucoumea klaineana
- Boswellia ameero
- Boswellia bullata
- Boswellia elongata
- Boswellia nana
- Boswellia ogadensis
- Boswellia ovalifoliolata
- Boswellia popoviana
- Boswellia socotrana
- Boswellia sp. A
- Bursera aromatica
- Bursera malacophylla
- Bursera tonkinensis
- Canarium fusco-calycinum
- Canarium luzonicum
- Canarium ovatum
- Canarium perlisanum
- Canarium pseudodecumanum
- Canarium pseudopatentinervium
- Canarium pseudopimela
- Canarium sarawakanum
- Canarium zeylanicum
- Commiphora alata
- Commiphora chaetocarpa
- Commiphora guidottii
- Commiphora monoica
- Dacryodes breviracemosa
- Dacryodes elmeri
- Dacryodes expansa
- Dacryodes igaganga
- Dacryodes multijuga
- Dacryodes puberula
- Haplolobus beccarii
- Haplolobus bintuluensis
- Haplolobus inaequifolius
- Haplolobus kapitensis
- Haplolobus leenhoutsii
- Haplolobus sarawakanus
- Protium connarifolium
- Protium correae
- Protium inconforme
- Protium pittieri
- Rosselia bracteata
- Santiria dacryodifolia
- Santiria impressinervis
- Santiria kalkmaniana
- Santiria nigricans
- Santiria sarawakana
- Tetragastris tomentosa

Subspecies

- Protium tenuifolium subsp. meleodii
- Protium tenuifolium subsp. sessiliflorum

Varieties

- Dacryodes macrocarpa var. kostermansii
- Dacryodes macrocarpa var. patentinervia
- Santiria rubiginosa var. latipetiolata

==== Hippocastanaceae ====
- Aesculus wangii

==== Meliaceae ====
Species

- Aglaia aherniana
- Aglaia amplexicaulis
- Aglaia angustifolia
- Aglaia apiocarpa
- Aglaia archiboldiana
- Aglaia australiensis
- Aglaia barbanthera
- Aglaia basiphylla
- Aglaia bourdillonii
- Aglaia brassii
- Aglaia brownii
- Aglaia ceramica
- Aglaia chittagonga
- Aglaia cinnamomea
- Aglaia coriacea
- Aglaia costata
- Aglaia cremea
- Aglaia cuspidata
- Aglaia densisquama
- Aglaia flavescens
- Aglaia fragilis
- Aglaia integrifolia
- Aglaia lancilimba
- Aglaia laxiflora
- Aglaia lepiorrhachis
- Aglaia leucoclada
- Aglaia macrostigma
- Aglaia mariannensis
- Aglaia membranifolia
- Aglaia parksii
- Aglaia penningtoniana
- Aglaia perviridis
- Aglaia polyneura
- Aglaia puberulanthera
- Aglaia pyriformis
- Aglaia ramotricha
- Aglaia rivularis
- Aglaia rubrivenia
- Aglaia scortechinii
- Aglaia smithii
- Aglaia speciosa
- Aglaia subsesilis
- Aglaia tenuicaulis
- Aglaia variisquama
- Aglaia yzermannii
- Amoora dasyclada
- Aphanamixis cumingiana, synonym of Aphanamixis polystachya
- Cedrela fissilis
- Cedrela odorata, Spanish cedar
- Chisocheton pauciflorus
- Chisocheton perakensis
- Chisocheton stellatus
- Dysoxylum angustifolium
- Dysoxylum ficiforme
- Dysoxylum palawanensis
- Dysoxylum turczaninowii
- Entandrophragma angolense
- Entandrophragma candollei, cedar kokoti
- Entandrophragma cylindricum, sapele
- Entandrophragma utile
- Guarea carapoides
- Guarea cartaguenya
- Guarea casimiriana
- Guarea caulobotrys
- Guarea cedrata, light bossé
- Guarea convergens
- Guarea cristata
- Guarea guentheri
- Guarea humaitensis
- Guarea jamaicensis
- Guarea juglandiformis
- Guarea macropetala
- Guarea mayombensis
- Guarea polymera
- Guarea pyriformis
- Guarea sphenophylla
- Guarea thompsonii, black guarea
- Guarea trunciflora
- Guarea velutina
- Khaya anthotheca, white mahogany
- Khaya grandifoliola
- Khaya ivorensis, Lagos mahogany
- Khaya senegalensis, dry zone mahogany
- Lovoa trichilioides, African walnut
- Malleastrum leroyi
- Pseudocarapa championii
- Ruagea membranacea
- Ruagea ovalis
- Sandoricum vidalii, synonym of Sandoricum koetjape
- Schmardaea microphylla
- Trichilia acuminata
- Trichilia areolata
- Trichilia bullata
- Trichilia casaretti
- Trichilia chirriactensis
- Trichilia emarginata
- Trichilia fasciculata
- Trichilia gamopetala
- Trichilia hispida
- Trichilia magnifoliola
- Trichilia micropetala
- Trichilia ornithothera
- Trichilia pittieri
- Trichilia primogenita
- Trichilia ramalhoi
- Trichilia silvatica
- Trichilia solitudinis
- Trichilia ulei
- Turraea adjanohounii
- Turraea socotrana
- Turraeanthus africana
- Walsura decipiens

Subspecies

- Guarea macrophylla subsp. macrophylla
- Trichilia lepidota subsp. schumanniana
- Trichilia schomburgkii subsp. javariensis
- Turraea fischeri subsp. eylesii, Matopos honeysuckle tree

==== Melianthaceae ====
- Bersama rosea

==== Rutaceae ====
Species

- Amyris polymorpha
- Angostura alipes
- Boronella koniamboensis
- Burkillanthus malaccensis
- Chloroxylon swietenia, East Indian satinwood
- Citropsis gabunensis
- Clausena calciphila
- Diphasiopsis fadenii
- Dutaillyea amosensis
- Esenbeckia leiocarpa
- Euodia macrocarpa
- Fagara externa
- Fagara mayu
- Flindersia laevicarpa
- Glycosmis longisepala
- Glycosmis perakensis
- Maclurodendron parviflorum
- Maclurodendron pubescens
- Melicope hawaiensis
- Melicope jugosa
- Melicope kaalaensis
- Melicope sororia
- Melicope subunifoliolata
- Melicope wawraeana
- Merrillia caloxylon
- Monanthocitrus oblanceolata
- Oxanthera aurantium
- Oxanthera brevipes
- Ptelea aptera
- Teclea carpopunctifera
- Thamnosma socotrana
- Vepris arushensis
- Vepris borenensis
- Vepris lecomteana
- Vepris mandangoa
- Vepris samburuensis
- Vepris sansibarensis
- Vepris trifoliolata
- Zanthoxylum albuquerquei
- Zanthoxylum atchoum
- Zanthoxylum chevalieri
- Zanthoxylum deremense
- Zanthoxylum dipetalum
- Zanthoxylum flavum, West Indian satinwood
- Zanthoxylum harrisii
- Zanthoxylum hartii
- Zanthoxylum holtzianum
- Zanthoxylum lindense
- Zanthoxylum oahuense, Oahu prickly-ash
- Zieria chevalieri

Subspecies

- Esenbeckia pentaphylla subsp. australensis

Varieties

- Glycosmis chlorosperma var. bidiensis
- Ravenia biramosa var. peruviana
- Vepris hanangensis var. hanangensis
- Vepris hanangensis var. unifoliolata
- Vepris morogorensis var. morogorensis

==== Sapindaceae ====
Species

- Alectryon repandodentatus
- Allophylus agbala
- Allophylus aldabricus
- Allophylus bullatus
- Allophylus chirindensis
- Allophylus pachyphyllus
- Allophylus roigii, synonym of Forchhammeria trifoliata
- Allophylus sechellensis
- Allophylus zeylanicus
- Arytera nekorensis
- Atalaya natalensis, Natal wing-nut
- Athyana weinmannifolia
- Camptolepis ramiflora
- Chytranthus obliquinervis
- Cossinia trifoliata
- Cupaniopsis acuticarpa
- Cupaniopsis bullata
- Cupaniopsis euneura
- Cupaniopsis globosa
- Cupaniopsis napaensis
- Cupaniopsis phanerophleibia
- Cupaniopsis strigosa
- Deinbollia insignis
- Deinbollia maxima
- Deinbollia molliuscula
- Deinbollia rambaensis
- Deinbollia saligna
- Diplokeleba herzogi
- Elattostachys aiyurensis
- Elattostachys dzumacensis
- Elattostachys erythrocarpum
- Elattostachys goropuensis
- Elattostachys rubrofructus
- Glenniea penangensis
- Glenniea unijuga
- Guioa asquamosa
- Guioa bicolor
- Guioa malukuensis
- Guioa melanopoda
- Guioa molliuscula
- Guioa multijuga
- Guioa normanbiensis
- Guioa novobritannica
- Guioa oligotricha
- Guioa patentinervis
- Guioa pauciflora
- Guioa plurinervis
- Guioa scalariformis
- Guioa unguiculata
- Guioa venusta
- Guioa waigeoensis
- Nephelium costatum
- Nephelium hamulatum
- Paullinia navicularis
- Placodiscus bancoensis
- Placodiscus boya
- Placodiscus bracteosus
- Placodiscus oblongifolius
- Placodiscus opacus
- Placodiscus paniculatus
- Podonephelium plicatum
- Sapindus oahuensis
- Sinoradlkofera minor

Varieties

- Litchi chinensis var. euspontanea

==== Simaroubaceae ====
- Alvaradoa jamaicensis
- Gymnostemon zaizou
- Hannoa kitombetombe
- Nothospondias staudtii
- Picramnia bullata
- Picrasma excelsa
- Pierreodendron kerstingii
- Quassia sanguinea
- Samadera bidwillii
- Soulamea terminalioides

==== Staphyleaceae ====
- Huertea cubensis
- Tapiscia sinensis
- Turpinia stipulacea

=== Santalales ===
Species

- Acanthosyris asipapote
- Agelanthus longipes
- Agelanthus pennatulus
- Agonandra loranthoides
- Agonandra macrocarpa
- Dendrophthora bulbifera
- Dendrophthora polyantha
- Dendrophthora sumacoi
- Dendrophthora tenuifolia
- Dulacia crassa
- Englerina drummondii
- Englerina triplinervia
- Erianthemum alveatum
- Erianthemum lindense
- Erianthemum occultum
- Malania oleifera
- Medusandra richardsiana
- Octoknema orientalis
- Okoubaka michelsonii
- Oncella curviramea
- Oncella gracilis
- Phoradendron canzacotoi
- Phoradendron pomasquianum
- Santalum album, Sandalwood
- Schoepfia harrisii
- Tapinanthus letouzeyi
- Tapinanthus preussii
- Thesium maritimum, coastal bastard toad-flax
- Ximenia roigii

Subspecies

- Englerina heckmanniana subsp. heckmanniana

Varieties

- Santalum haleakalae var. haleakalae, Haleakala sandalwood
- Santalum haleakalae var. lanaiense
- Santalum insulare var. hendersonensis
- Santalum insulare var. marchionense

=== Saxifragales ===
==== Crassulaceae ====
- Aeonium balsamiferum
- Aeonium saundersii
- Kalanchoe robusta
- Sedum brissemoretii
- Sempervivum charadzeae, Kharadze's houseleek

==== Saxifragaceae ====
- Saxifraga berica
- Saxifraga osloensis
- Saxifraga portosanctana

==== Other Saxifragales species ====
- Liquidambar obovata
- Ribes austroecuadorense
- Ribes lehmannii

=== Solanales ===
There are 33 species and two subspecies in the order Solanales assessed as vulnerable.

==== Solanaceae ====
Species

- Brunfelsia jamaicensis
- Brunfelsia membranacea
- Brunfelsia splendida
- Deprea ecuatoriana
- Iochroma lehmannii
- Iochroma longipes
- Larnax andersonii
- Larnax psilophyta
- Lycianthes hypochrysea
- Markea epifita
- Markea spruceana
- Sessea sodiroi
- Solanum asteropilodes
- Solanum chilliasense
- Solanum exiguum
- Solanum fortunense
- Solanum hypermegethes
- Solanum imbaburense
- Solanum interandinum
- Solanum leiophyllum
- Solanum regularifolium
- Solanum roseum
- Solanum sibundoyense
- Trianaea naeka

Subspecies

- Solanum circinatum subsp. ramosa
- Solanum corymbiflora subsp. mortoniana

==== Convolvulaceae ====
- Convolvulus fernandesii
- Convolvulus massonii
- Ipomoea chrysocalyx
- Ipomoea pulcherrima
- Metaporana obtusa
- Seddera fastigiata
- Seddera semhahensis
- Seddera spinosa

==== Menyanthaceae ====
- Villarsia goldblattiana

=== Violales ===
There are 86 species, one subspecies, and three varieties in Violales assessed as vulnerable.

==== Flacourtiaceae ====
Species

- Banara brasiliensis
- Bennettiodendron cordatum
- Casearia crassinervis
- Casearia engleri
- Casearia flavovirens
- Casearia macrocarpa
- Casearia mannii
- Casearia megacarpa
- Casearia wynadensis
- Dasylepis integra
- Dovyalis xanthocarpa
- Homalium dalzielii
- Homalium gracilipes
- Homalium kunstleri
- Homalium leratiorum
- Homalium ogoouense
- Homalium patoklaense
- Homalium rubiginosum
- Homalium sleumerianum
- Homalium smythei
- Homalium taypau
- Homalium travancoricum
- Homalium undulatum
- Hydnocarpus annamensis
- Hydnocarpus filipes
- Hydnocarpus hainanensis
- Hydnocarpus humei
- Hydnocarpus octandra
- Hydnocarpus pentandrus
- Laetia micrantha
- Lasiochlamys mandjeliana
- Lasiochlamys pseudocoriacea
- Lunania cubensis
- Lunania polydactyla
- Lunania racemosa
- Oncoba lophocarpa, synonym of Caloncoba lophocarpa
- Rawsonia burtt-davyi
- Ryparosa fasciculata
- Samyda glabrata
- Samyda villosa
- Scolopia steenisiana
- Trichadenia zeylanica
- Xylosma boulindae
- Xylosma kaalaensis
- Xylosma molesta
- Xylosma palawanensis
- Xylosma proctorii
- Xylosma serpentina
- Xylosma tuberculata

Subspecies

- Hydnocarpus macrocarpa subsp. macrocarpa

Varieties

- Homalium lacticum var. glabratum
- Xylotheca tettensis var. fissistyla

==== Loasaceae ====
- Nasa amaluzensis
- Nasa asplundii
- Nasa auca
- Nasa glabra
- Nasa hornii
- Nasa jungifolia
- Nasa modesta
- Nasa rufipila
- Nasa tabularis

==== Passifloraceae ====
- Basananthe zanzibarica
- Passiflora ampullacea
- Passiflora deltoifolia
- Passiflora eggersii
- Passiflora hirtiflora
- Passiflora jamesonii
- Passiflora jatunsachensis
- Passiflora roseorum
- Passiflora sanctae-barbarae
- Passiflora trochlearis

==== Violaceae ====
Species

- Allexis cauliflora
- Allexis obanensis
- Rinorea brachythrix
- Rinorea longistipulata
- Rinorea oraria
- Rinorea pectino-squamata
- Rinorea ramiziana
- Rinorea thomasii
- Rinorea thomensis
- Rinorea ulmifolia
- Rinorea uxpanapana
- Viola athois
- Viola chamissoniana

Varieties

- Rinorea convallarioides var. marsabitensis

==== Other Violales species ====
- Afrostyrax lepidophyllus
- Ancistrocladus grandiflorus
- Ancistrocladus letestui
- Helianthemum alypoides
- Vasconcellea palandensis

=== Vitales ===
- Cayratia pedata

== Monocotyledons ==
There are 619 species, six subspecies, and four varieties of monocotyledon assessed as vulnerable.

=== Alismatales ===
- Alisma wahlenbergii
- Damasonium alisma
- Damasonium polyspermum
- Echinodorus eglandulosus
- Limnophyton fluitans

=== Arales ===
==== Araceae ====
- Amorphophallus curvistylis
- Amorphophallus kienluongensis
- Amorphophallus preussii
- Amorphophallus verticillatus
- Anthurium albovirescens
- Anthurium auritum
- Anthurium balslevii
- Anthurium bullosum
- Anthurium cabuyalense
- Anthurium caloveboranum
- Anthurium ceratiinum
- Anthurium curtispadix
- Anthurium dolichophyllum
- Anthurium ecuadorense
- Anthurium esmeraldense
- Anthurium gualeanum
- Anthurium hebetatilaminum
- Anthurium jaramilloi
- Anthurium jimenae
- Anthurium leonianum
- Anthurium magnifolium
- Anthurium manabianum
- Anthurium miniatum
- Anthurium nemorale
- Anthurium oxyphyllum
- Anthurium pedunculare
- Anthurium polystictum
- Anthurium punctatum
- Anthurium rimbachii
- Anthurium silanchense
- Anthurium subcoerulescens
- Anthurium superbum
- Anthurium tenaense
- Arisaema maxwellii
- Arum purpureospathum
- Chlorospatha castula
- Chlorospatha ilensis
- Culcasia sanagensis
- Gonatopus petiolulatus
- Philodendron hooveri
- Philodendron leyvae
- Philodendron musifolium
- Philodendron riparium
- Protarum sechellarum
- Rhaphidophora pusilla
- Stenospermation gracile
- Stenospermation hilligii
- Stylochaeton crassispathus
- Stylochaeton euryphyllus
- Stylochaeton milneanus
- Stylochaeton tortispathus
- Syngonium harlingianum
- Syngonium sparreorum
- Typhonium johnsonianum

=== Arecales ===
Species

- Aiphanes chiribogensis
- Aiphanes duquei
- Aiphanes lindeniana
- Alloschmidia glabrata
- Archontophoenix myolensis, Myola palm
- Areca ipot, ipot palm
- Areca jokowi
- Areca parens
- Areca whitfardii
- Arenga listeri, Lister's palm
- Arenga wightii
- Asterogyne spicata
- Astrocaryum carnosum
- Bactris coloniata
- Bactris horridispatha
- Bactris jamaicana, prickly pole
- Bactris longiseta
- Bactris pickelii
- Bactris polystachya
- Basselinia favieri
- Basselinia iterata
- Basselinia tomentosa
- Basselinia vestita
- Beccariophoenix alfredii
- Beccariophoenix madagascariensis
- Bentinckia condapanna
- Borassodendron machadonis
- Brahea aculeata
- Brahea pimo
- Butia eriospatha
- Butia purpurascens
- Calamus egregius
- Ceroxylon echinulatum
- Chamaedorea adscendens
- Chamaedorea foveata
- Chamaedorea oblongata
- Coccothrinax pauciramosa
- Colpothrinax wrightii
- Copernicia brittonorum
- Copernicia gigas
- Corypha microclada
- Cyphophoenix elegans
- Cyphosperma trichospadix
- Deckenia nobilis, millionaire's salad
- Dypsis andrianatonga
- Dypsis bejofo
- Dypsis bernierana
- Dypsis betamponensis
- Dypsis betsimisarakae
- Dypsis bonsai
- Dypsis decaryi
- Dypsis decipiens, manambe palm
- Dypsis delicatula
- Dypsis gautieri
- Dypsis hiarakae
- Dypsis humbertii
- Dypsis jumelleana
- Dypsis lanceolata
- Dypsis lantzeana
- Dypsis lokohoensis
- Dypsis louvelii
- Dypsis makirae
- Dypsis marojejyi
- Dypsis minuta
- Dypsis montana
- Dypsis occidentalis
- Dypsis onilahensis
- Dypsis oreophila
- Dypsis paludosa
- Dypsis pembana
- Dypsis perrieri
- Dypsis pilulifera
- Dypsis prestoniana
- Dypsis procera
- Dypsis pusilla
- Dypsis scottiana
- Dypsis serpentina
- Dypsis thermarum
- Dypsis thiryana
- Dypsis tsaravoasira
- Dypsis viridis
- Euterpe luminosa
- Gaussia attenuata
- Gaussia gomez-pompae
- Gaussia maya
- Hedyscepe canterburyana, big mountain palm
- Howea belmoreana, curly palm
- Howea forsteriana
- Hydriastele vitiensis
- Jubaea chilensis
- Jubaeopsis afra, Pondoland palm
- Licuala dasyantha
- Livistona carinensis, Bankouale palm
- Livistona robinsoniana
- Livistona woodfordii
- Normanbya normanbyi, black palm
- Oenocarpus circumtextus
- Oncosperma platyphyllum
- Orania ravaka
- Orania trispatha
- Pholidocarpus kingianus
- Pholidocarpus macrocarpus
- Pritchardia lowreyana
- Pseudophoenix sargentii
- Raphia regalis
- Ravenea glauca
- Ravenea xerophila
- Rhopaloblaste augusta
- Roystonea lenis
- Sabal causiarum
- Sabal gretheriae
- Sabal pumos
- Sabal uresana
- Schippia concolor, mountain pimento
- Syagrus glaucescens
- Syagrus stratincola
- Veitchia simulans
- Wettinia aequatorialis
- Wettinia longipetala
- Zombia antillarum

Varieties

- Hemithrinax rivularis var. rivularis
- Hemithrinax rivularis var. savannarum

=== Asparagales ===
==== Orchidaceae ====
Species

- Acianthera malachantha
- Acianthera odontotepala
- Acianthera tokachii
- Aeranthes carnosa
- Aeranthes schlechteri
- Aeranthes tropophila
- Aerides leeana
- Agrostophyllum laterale
- Altensteinia longispicata
- Anacamptis boryi, Bory's anacamptis
- Anathallis guimaraensii
- Ancistrorhynchus laxiflorus
- Androcorys oxysepalus
- Angraecopsis cryptantha
- Angraecopsis parva
- Angraecopsis tridens
- Angraecum pungens
- Angraecum pyriforme
- Anoectochilus sandvicensis, Hawaii jewel-orchid
- Ansellia africana, leopard orchid
- Bartholina etheliae
- Benthamia perularioides
- Brachionidium capillare
- Brachionidium diaphanum
- Bulbophyllum atrosanguineum
- Bulbophyllum bifarium
- Bulbophyllum gravidum
- Bulbophyllum jaapii
- Bulbophyllum nigericum
- Bulbophyllum rubrum
- Bulbophyllum sanderianum
- Caladenia dundasiae, Dunda's spider orchid
- Calanthe delavayi
- Calanthe fargesii
- Calanthe henryi
- Cheirostylis notialis, southern fleshy jewel orchid
- Corallorhiza bentleyi, Bentley's coralroot
- Cynorkis uncata
- Cypripedium bardolphianum, Bardolph's cypripedium
- Cypripedium candidum, white lady's slipper
- Cypripedium cordigerum, heart-shaped lip cypripedium
- Cypripedium debile, frail cypripedium
- Cypripedium fasciculatum, clustered lady's-slipper
- Cypripedium flavum, yellow cypripedium
- Cypripedium henryi, Henry's cypripedium
- Cypripedium irapeanum, Irapeao cypripedium
- Cypripedium kentuckiense, Kentucky lady's slipper
- Cypripedium montanum, mountain lady's slipper
- Cypripedium palangshanense, palangshan cypripedium
- Cypripedium passerinum, sparrow's-egg lady's-slipper
- Cypripedium plectrochilum, ram's head lady slipper
- Dendrobium sanderae
- Diaphananthe polydactyla
- Dinklageella scandens
- Disperis aphylla
- Disperis mildbraedii
- Epidendrum diothonaeoides
- Epigeneium treacherianum
- Epipactis nordeniorum
- Eulophia faberi, synonym of Eulophia dabia
- Gastrodia elata, tall gastrodia
- Genyorchis macrantha, synonym of Bulbophyllum deshmukhii
- Habenaria delavayi
- Habenaria fargesii
- Habenaria finetiana
- Habenaria fordii
- Habenaria kornasiana
- Habenaria mairei
- Habenaria nigrescens
- Habenaria obovata
- Habenaria plectromaniaca
- Habenaria stylites
- Habenaria thomana
- Habenaria yuana
- Hemipilia flabellata
- Hemipilia forrestii
- Hemipilia limprichtii
- Herminium ophioglossoides
- Holothrix socotrana
- Isotria medeoloides, small whorled pogonia
- Malaxis muscifera
- Malaxis seychellarum
- Masdevallia notosibirica
- Neobenthamia gracilis
- Ophrys argolica, Argolic ophrys
- Paphiopedilum hirsutissimum, shaggy paphiopedilum
- Paphiopedilum villosum, villose paphiopedilum
- Phalaenopsis violacea
- Phragmipedium humboldtii, Humboldt's phragmipedium
- Phragmipedium lindleyanum, Lindley's phragmipedium
- Phragmipedium reticulatum, reticulated phragmipedium
- Phragmipedium warszewiczianum
- Platanthera chapmanii, Chapman's fringed orchid
- Platanthera deflexilabella
- Platanthera finetiana
- Platanthera likiangensis
- Platanthera longiglandula, synonym of Platanthera bakeriana
- Platanthera oreophila
- Platanthera platantheroides
- Platanthera sinica
- Platanthera yadonii, Yadon's rein
- Platythelys paranaensis
- Pleione chunii
- Pleione formosana
- Pleione pleionoides
- Polystachya bicalcarata
- Psychilis olivacea
- Sobennikoffia poissoniana
- Spiranthes parksii, Navasota ladies-tresses
- Stelis tabacina
- Telipogon alexii
- Tsaiorchis neottianthoides
- Vanda spathulata

Subspecies

- Cynorkis buchwaldiana subsp. braunii
- Polystachya albescens subsp. kraenzlinii
- Polystachya caespitifica subsp. latilabris

==== Other Asparagales ====
Species

- Albuca yerburyi, yellow shum shum lily
- Allium exaltatum
- Allium pardoi
- Allium pyrenaicum
- Allium schmitzii
- Aloe brachystachys
- Aloe bussei
- Aloe leachii
- Aloe lindenii
- Aloe massawana
- Aloe pulcherrima
- Aloe retrospiciens
- Aloe rugosifolia
- Aloe somaliensis
- Aloe squarrosa
- Aloe tororoana
- Aloe ukambensis
- Asparagus arborescens
- Asparagus plocamoides
- Asphodeline tenuior, thin asphodeline
- Asphodelus bento-rainhae
- Babiana salteri
- Bulbinella eburniflora
- Chrysodracon auwahiensis
- Chrysodracon halapepe
- Crinum campanulatum
- Crocus cyprius
- Crocus hartmannianus
- Cyanella aquatica
- Cyrtanthus flavus
- Dipcadi kuriensis
- Dracaena cinnabari, dragon's blood tree
- Dracaena draco, Canary Island dragon tree
- Dracaena viridiflora
- Eriospermum halenbergense
- Eucrosia dodsonii
- Eucrosia stricklandii
- Galanthus ikariae
- Galanthus koenenianus, Koenen's snowdrop
- Galanthus peshmenii
- Galanthus reginae-olgae
- Geissorhiza lithicola
- Gladiolus hajastanicus, Armenian sword-lily
- Gladiolus pole-evansii
- Hypoxidia rhizophylla
- Iris camillae, Kamilla's iris
- Iris haynei, Gilboa iris
- Iris nigricans, black iris
- Iris vartanii, vartanii iris
- Kniphofia goetzei
- Moraea callista
- Moraea stagnalis
- Ornithogalum hyrcanum, hyrkanyan starflowers
- Pamianthe parviflora
- Phaedranassa cinerea
- Phaedranassa schizantha
- Romulea multisulcata
- Trachyandra erythrorrhiza
- Trachyandra peculiaris

Subspecies

- Aloe gilbertii subsp. megalacanthoides
- Iris spuria subsp. notha, mimic iris

=== Bromeliales ===
- Aechmea aculeatosepala
- Aechmea biflora
- Aechmea lugoi
- Aechmea patriciae
- Aechmea roeseliae
- Deuterocohnia chrysantha
- Gregbrownia brownii, syn. Mezobromelia brownii
- Greigia atrobrunnea
- Guzmania aequatorialis
- Guzmania alborosea
- Guzmania andreettae
- Guzmania atrocastanea
- Guzmania bergii
- Guzmania corniculata
- Guzmania dalstroemii
- Guzmania fusispica
- Guzmania harlingii
- Guzmania hirtzii
- Guzmania hollinensis
- Guzmania inexpectata
- Guzmania izkoi
- Guzmania kentii
- Guzmania madisonii
- Guzmania pseudospectabilis
- Guzmania puyoensis
- Guzmania sieffiana
- Guzmania zakii
- Hechtia melanocarpa
- Navia sandwithii
- Pitcairnia andreetae
- Pitcairnia carnososepala, syn. Pepinia carnososepala
- Pitcairnia devansayana
- Pitcairnia elvirae, syn. Pepinia verrucosa
- Pitcairnia ferrell-ingramiae
- Pitcairnia harlingii, syn. Pepinia harlingii
- Pitcairnia harrylutheri, syn. Pepinia fulgens
- Pitcairnia hirtzii
- Pitcairnia prolifera
- Pitcairnia stevensonii
- Pitcairnia unilateralis
- Pitcairnia violascens
- Puya alata
- Puya herrerae
- Puya obconica
- Puya pichinchae
- Puya pygmaea
- Puya reflexiflora
- Puya sodiroana
- Racinaea blassii
- Racinaea euryelytra
- Racinaea hauggiae
- Racinaea tandapiana
- Ronnbergia wuelfinghoffii, syn. Aechmea wuelfinghoffii
- Tillandsia aequatorialis
- Tillandsia brenneri
- Tillandsia candida
- Tillandsia cucullata
- Tillandsia emergens
- Tillandsia hemkeri
- Tillandsia hirtzii
- Tillandsia lutheri, syn. Vriesea lutheri
- Tillandsia marnieri-lapostollei
- Tillandsia ortgiesiana
- Tillandsia pretiosa
- Tillandsia raackii
- Tillandsia rhodosticta
- Tillandsia sodiroi
- Tillandsia walter-tillii, syn. Vriesea tillii
- Vriesea andreettae
- Vriesea camptoclada
- Vriesea limonensis
- Vriesea penduliscapa
- Vriesea wuelfinghoffii
- Werauhia haltonii
- Werauhia paupera

=== Commelinales ===
- Aneilema silvaticum
- Murdannia lanceolata
- Palisota preussiana
- Xyris boliviana
- Xyris kibaraensis

=== Cyclanthales ===
- Asplundia cayapensis
- Asplundia cuspidata
- Asplundia lilacina
- Asplundia meraensis
- Asplundia pastazana
- Asplundia quinindensis
- Asplundia sparrei
- Sphaeradenia brachiolata
- Sphaeradenia versicolor

=== Dioscoreales ===
==== Burmanniaceae ====
- Afrothismia insignis
- Thismia melanomitra

=== Eriocaulales ===
- Eriocaulon aethiopicum
- Eriocaulon asteroides
- Eriocaulon bamendae
- Eriocaulon karnatakense
- Eriocaulon kolhapurense
- Eriocaulon konkanense
- Eriocaulon maharashtrense
- Eriocaulon parvulum
- Eriocaulon pectinatum
- Eriocaulon tuberiferum
- Syngonanthus yacuambensis

=== Hydrocharitales ===
- Halophila baillonii, clover grass
- Halophila beccarii, ocean turf grass
- Halophila hawaiiana
- Lagarosiphon steudneri

=== Juncales ===
- Juncus caesariensis
- Juncus sorrentinii
- Luzula mannii

=== Liliales ===
Species

- Androcymbium psammophilum
- Bomarea elegans
- Bomarea gracilis
- Bomarea lanata
- Bomarea lutea
- Colchicum corsicum
- Dioscorea longicuspis
- Dioscorea rosei
- Fritillaria drenovskii
- Fritillaria euboeica
- Gagea apulica, Gagée des pouilles
- Gagea chrysantha, golden gagea
- Gagea luberonensis, Luberon gagea
- Gagea moniliformis, Chaplet gagea
- Gagea omalensis, Omalos gagea
- Gagea sicula
- Lilium rhodopeum

Subspecies

- Fritillaria obliqua subsp. tuntasia

=== Najadales ===
- Aponogeton angustifolius
- Aponogeton azureus
- Aponogeton bruggenii
- Phyllospadix iwatensis
- Posidonia sinuosa
- Potamogeton ogdenii
- Zostera caespitosa
- Zostera capensis

=== Poales ===
There are 78 species and two varieties in Poales assessed as vulnerable.

==== Cyperaceae ====
Species

- Bolboschoenus grandispicus
- Bulbostylis pseudoperennis
- Carex dolichogyne
- Carex korkischkoae
- Carex monostachya
- Carex phragmitoides
- Carex runssoroensis
- Carex subinflata
- Carpha eminii
- Cyathocoma bachmannii
- Cyperus commixtus
- Cyperus cyprius
- Cyperus densibulbosus
- Cyperus lateriticus
- Cyperus micropelophilus
- Cyperus rheophytorum
- Cyperus semifertilis, missionary nutgrass
- Fuirena felicis
- Fuirena swamyi
- Hypolytrum mauritianum
- Lagenocarpus compactus
- Machaerina lamii
- Mapania ferruginea
- Mapania seychellaria
- Nemum bulbostyloides
- Uncinia ecuadorensis
- Uncinia subsacculata
- Uncinia tenuifolia

Varieties

- Bulbostylis densa var. cameroonensis
- Carex bequaertii var. maxima

==== Poaceae ====
- Achnatherum roshevitzii, Roshevich's achnatherum
- Alloeochaete namuliensis
- Alloeochaete ulugurensis
- Aristida guayllabambensis
- Calamagrostis aurea
- Calamagrostis carchiensis
- Calamagrostis expansa
- Calamagrostis fulgida
- Calamagrostis hirta
- Calamagrostis llanganatensis
- Calamagrostis steyermarkii
- Calamagrostis teretifolia
- Chusquea falcata
- Chusquea loxensis
- Chusquea maclurei
- Colpodium chionogeiton
- Colpodium drakensbergense
- Colpodium hedbergii
- Cortaderia turbaria, Chatham Island toe
- Danthonia holm-nielsenii
- Deschampsia angusta
- Eragrostis ambleia
- Eragrostis perbella
- Eragrostis usambarensis
- Eremocaulon setosum
- Festuca brigantina
- Festuca caldasii
- Festuca parciflora
- Festuca yemenensis
- Glyphochloa santapaui
- Helictochloa hackelii
- Hubbardia heptaneuron
- Hylebates chlorochloe
- Hypseochloa cameroonensis
- Isachne bicolor
- Neurolepis asymmetrica
- Neurolepis laegaardii
- Neurolepis villosa
- Opizia bracteata
- Panicum joshuae, rock millet
- Panicum pinifolium
- Panicum vollesenii
- Paspalum rugulosum
- Phalaris maderensis
- Puccinellia pungens
- Rhytachne furtiva
- Rhytachne glabra
- Stipa bavarica
- Stipa karjaginii, Karjagin's feather-grass
- Suddia sagittifolia

=== Triuridales ===
- Seychellaria thomassetii

=== Zingiberales ===
There are 42 species in the order Zingiberales assessed as vulnerable.

==== Costaceae ====
- Costus osae

==== Heliconiaceae ====
- Heliconia berryi
- Heliconia brenneri
- Heliconia excelsa
- Heliconia fredberryana
- Heliconia gaiboriana
- Heliconia litana
- Heliconia lutheri
- Heliconia markiana
- Heliconia obscura
- Heliconia paludigena
- Heliconia pardoi
- Heliconia peckenpaughii
- Heliconia peteriana
- Heliconia riopalenquensis
- Heliconia virginalis

==== Marantaceae ====
- Calathea congesta
- Calathea curaraya
- Calathea gandersii
- Calathea lanicaulis
- Calathea latrinotecta
- Calathea multicinta
- Calathea pluriplicata
- Stromanthe ramosissima
- Thalia pavonii

==== Zingiberaceae ====
- Amomum calcaratum
- Amomum lambirense
- Amomum odontocarpum
- Amomum petaloideum
- Amomum vespertilio
- Curcuma candida
- Curcuma pseudomontana, hill turmeric
- Curcuma rhabdota, candy cane ginger
- Geostachys smitinandii
- Globba flagellaris
- Globba praecox
- Haniffia albiflora
- Pleuranthodium papilionaceum
- Renealmia oligotricha
- Siamanthus siliquosus
- Siliquamomum tonkinense
- Zingiber collinsii

== See also ==
- Lists of IUCN Red List vulnerable species
- List of least concern plants
- List of near threatened plants
- List of endangered plants
- List of critically endangered plants
- List of recently extinct plants
- List of data deficient plants
