= List of Ternstroemia species =

Ternstroemia is a widespread genus of plants distributed throughout tropical and subtropical regions in Africa, Asia, and the Americas.

== Extant species ==
The following 161 species of Ternstroemia are accepted by Plants of the World Online as of June 2026:

=== A–C ===
- Ternstroemia acajetensis Cast.-Campos & Pal.-Wass.
- Ternstroemia acrodantha Kobuski & Steyerm.
- Ternstroemia acuminata Jack
- Ternstroemia africana Melch.
- Ternstroemia alnifolia Wawra
- Ternstroemia amistadensis Q.Jiménez & D.Santam.
- Ternstroemia aracae B.M.Boom
- Ternstroemia asymmetrica Rusby
- Ternstroemia atlantica J.R.Grande
- Ternstroemia bahiensis J.A.Vieira & D.Samp.
- Ternstroemia baracoensis O.C.Schmidt
- Ternstroemia barkeri Ekman & O.C.Schmidt
- Ternstroemia beccarii Stapf ex Ridl.
- Ternstroemia biangulipes H.T.Chang
- Ternstroemia borbensis Kobuski
- Ternstroemia brachypoda (Wawra) Kobuski
- Ternstroemia brasiliensis Cambess.
- Ternstroemia britteniana F.Muell.
- Ternstroemia browniana Kobuski
- Ternstroemia bullata Proctor
- Ternstroemia buxifolia Ekman & O.C.Schmidt
- Ternstroemia cachalu Fonseca-Cortés & J.R.Grande
- Ternstroemia calycina Fawc. & Rendle
- Ternstroemia camelliifolia Linden & Planch.
- Ternstroemia cameroonensis Cheek
- Ternstroemia campinicola B.M.Boom
- Ternstroemia candolleana Wawra
- Ternstroemia caput-medusae J.R.Grande
- Ternstroemia carnosa Cambess.
- Ternstroemia cernua Griseb.
- Ternstroemia chapaensis Gagnep.
- Ternstroemia cherryi (F.M.Bailey) Merr. ex J.F.Bailey & C.T White
- Ternstroemia circumscissilis Kobuski
- Ternstroemia citrina Ridl.
- Ternstroemia cleistogama Kobuski
- Ternstroemia clusiifolia Kunth
- Ternstroemia compacta (J.F.Macbr.) Molinari
- Ternstroemia congestiflora Triana & Planch.
- Ternstroemia coniocarpa L.K.Ling
- Ternstroemia coriacea Scheff.
- Ternstroemia crassifolia Benth.
- Ternstroemia cuneifolia Gardner

=== D–J ===
- Ternstroemia dehiscens Huber
- Ternstroemia delicatula Choisy
- Ternstroemia dentata (Aubl.) Sw.
- Ternstroemia dentisepala B.M.Barthol.
- Ternstroemia discoidea Gleason
- Ternstroemia discolor Hung T.Chang & S.H.Shi
- Ternstroemia distyla Kobuski
- Ternstroemia duidae Gleason
- Ternstroemia dura Gleason
- Ternstroemia ekmanii O.C.Schmidt
- Ternstroemia elliptica Sw.
- Ternstroemia elongata (Korth.) Koord.
- Ternstroemia emarginata (Gardner) Choisy
- Ternstroemia evenia (King) A.C.Sm.
- Ternstroemia fandango Fonseca-Cortés & J.R.Grande
- Ternstroemia flavescens Griseb.
- Ternstroemia foetida Kobuski
- Ternstroemia fragrans (Champ.) Choisy
- Ternstroemia gitingensis Elmer
- Ternstroemia glandulosa Alain
- Ternstroemia gleasoniana Kobuski
- Ternstroemia globiflora Ruiz & Pav.
- Ternstroemia glomerata Proctor
- Ternstroemia gracilifolia O.C.Schmidt
- Ternstroemia grandiosa Kobuski
- Ternstroemia granulata Krug & Urb.
- Ternstroemia guanchezii B.M.Boom
- Ternstroemia guerrerensis Alc.-Ayala, Luna-Vega, Mar.-Ceceña & Alvarado-Sizzo
- Ternstroemia guineensis Cheek
- Ternstroemia gymnanthera (Wight & Arn.) Bedd.
- Ternstroemia hainanensis H.T.Chang
- Ternstroemia hartii Krug & Urb.
- Ternstroemia heptasepala Krug & Urb.
- Ternstroemia hosei Ridl.
- Ternstroemia houtsoortiana Pierre
- Ternstroemia howardiana Kobuski
- Ternstroemia huasteca B.M.Barthol.
- Ternstroemia huberi J.R.Grande
- Ternstroemia insignis Y.C.Wu
- Ternstroemia jelskii (Szyszył.) Melch.

=== K–O ===
- Ternstroemia killipiana Kobuski
- Ternstroemia kjellbergii Kobuski
- Ternstroemia klugiana Kobuski
- Ternstroemia krukoffiana Kobuski
- Ternstroemia kwangtungensis Merr.
- Ternstroemia laevigata Wawra
- Ternstroemia landae Standl. & L.O.Williams
- Ternstroemia ledermannii (Lauterb.) Hatus.
- Ternstroemia lehmannii (Hieron.) Urb.
- Ternstroemia liesneriana D.Santam. & Lagom.
- Ternstroemia lineata DC.
- Ternstroemia lowii Stapf
- Ternstroemia luquillensis Krug & Urb.
- Ternstroemia luteoflora L.K.Ling
- Ternstroemia maclellandiana Ridl.
- Ternstroemia macrocarpa Triana & Planch.
- Ternstroemia magnifica Stapf ex Ridl.
- Ternstroemia maguirei B.M.Boom
- Ternstroemia maltbya Rose
- Ternstroemia megaloptycha Kobuski
- Ternstroemia meiocarpa Kobuski
- Ternstroemia meridionalis Mutis ex L.f.
- Ternstroemia merrilliana Kobuski
- Ternstroemia microcalyx Krug & Urb.
- Ternstroemia microphylla Merr.
- Ternstroemia moaensis Borhidi & O.Muñiz
- Ternstroemia monostigma W.R.Barker
- Ternstroemia montana Ridl.
- Ternstroemia multiovulata Gómez-Laur., Q.Jiménez & N.Zamora
- Ternstroemia mutisiana Kobuski
- Ternstroemia nabirensis Sa.Kurata
- Ternstroemia nashii Urb.
- Ternstroemia nitida Merr.
- Ternstroemia oleifolia Wawra
- Ternstroemia oligostemon Krug & Urb.
- Ternstroemia ombrophicola J.A.Vieira & D.Samp.
- Ternstroemia ostracophylla J.R.Grande

=== P–Z ===
- Ternstroemia pachytrocha Kobuski
- Ternstroemia pacifica Fonseca-Cortés & J.R.Grande
- Ternstroemia palembangensis Kobuski
- Ternstroemia parviflora Krug & Urb.
- Ternstroemia patens (Korth.) Choisy
- Ternstroemia peduncularis DC.
- Ternstroemia penangiana Choisy
- Ternstroemia penduliflora Kobuski
- Ternstroemia philippinensis Merr.
- Ternstroemia polyandra Kobuski
- Ternstroemia polypetala Melch.
- Ternstroemia prancei B.M.Boom
- Ternstroemia pubescens Kobuski
- Ternstroemia punctata (Aubl.) Sw.
- Ternstroemia pungens Gleason
- Ternstroemia quinquepartita Ruiz & Pav.
- Ternstroemia religiosa Fonseca-Cortés & J.R.Grande
- Ternstroemia robinsonii Merr.
- Ternstroemia rostrata Krug & Urb.
- Ternstroemia rupestris J.A.Vieira & D.Samp.
- Ternstroemia schomburgkiana Benth.
- Ternstroemia scortechinii King
- Ternstroemia selleana Ekman & O.C.Schmidt
- Ternstroemia serrata Jack
- Ternstroemia serratifolia J.A.Vieira & D.Samp.
- Ternstroemia sichuanensis L.K.Ling
- Ternstroemia simaoensis L.K.Ling
- Ternstroemia stahlii Krug & Urb.
- Ternstroemia steyermarkii Kobuski
- Ternstroemia subcaudata Kobuski
- Ternstroemia subserrata (Rusby) Melch.
- Ternstroemia subsessilis (Britton) Kobuski
- Ternstroemia sylvatica Schltdl. & Cham.
- Ternstroemia tepezapote Schltdl. & Cham.
- Ternstroemia toquian Fern.-Vill.
- Ternstroemia unilocularis Kobuski & Steyerm.
- Ternstroemia urdanetensis (Elmer) Kobuski
- Ternstroemia urophora Kobuski
- Ternstroemia verticillata Klotzsch ex Wawra
- Ternstroemia wallichiana (Griff.) Engl.
- Ternstroemia washikiatii Cornejo & C.Ulloa
- Ternstroemia yunnanensis L.K.Ling

=== Formerly placed here ===
- Ternstroemia albopunctata Planch. ex Griseb. = Cleyera albopunctata (Planch. ex Griseb.) Krug & Urb.
- Ternstroemia pentapetala Jack = Saurauia pentapetala (Jack) Hoogland
- Ternstroemia purpusii Brandegee = Symplococarpon purpusii (Brandegee) Kobuski
- Ternstroemia rubiginosa Jack = Saurauia rubiginosa (Jack) Merr.

== Fossil species ==
In addition to the living species, approximately 16 fossil species have been ascribed to Ternstroemia according to the International Fossil Plant Names Index as of June 2026:

- †Ternstroemia bartonensis (M.Chandler) Mai
- †Ternstroemia bilinica Ettingsh.
- †Ternstroemia boveyana (M.Chandler) Mai
- †Ternstroemia chandlerae Holý
- †Ternstroemia dorofeevii Geissert, H.-J.Gregor & Mai
- †Ternstroemia maekawae Matsuo
- †Ternstroemia mocanerifolia Kolak.
- †Ternstroemia neglecta Mai
- †Ternstroemia praemocanerifolia Givul., Iust.Petrescu & O.Barbu
- †Ternstroemia radialocarinata Mai
- †Ternstroemia radobojana Ettingsh.
- †Ternstroemia reniformis (M.Chandler) Mai
- †Ternstroemia rugata (E.Reid & M.Chandler) Holý
- †Ternstroemia sequoioides (Engelh.) Bůžek & Holý
- †Ternstroemia setoi Huzioka & Takahasi

=== Formerly placed here ===
- †Ternstroemia abchasica Kolak. = †Camellia abchasica (Kolak.) Kolak.
- †Ternstroemia crassipes Velen. = †Pseudoternstroemiophyllum crassipes (Velen.) Doweld
