= List of plants of Colima =

This article contains lists of plants found in the state of Colima, Mexico. As of 2006, there were a reported 550 species of tree in the state.

== Cupressaceae ==
Cupressus

- Cupressus lusitanica: Mexican white cedar, or Cedar-of-Goa

== Pinaceae ==
Abies

- Abies religiosa: Sacred Fir or Oyamel

Pinus

- Pinus devoniana
- Pinus douglasiana
- Pinus hartwegii
- Pinus leiophylla
- Pinus maximinoi
- Pinus oocarpa
- Pinus pseudostrobus
- Pinus teocote

== Taxodiaceae ==
Taxodium

- Taxodium mucronatum

== Acanthaceae ==
Bravaisia

- Bravaisia integerrima

== Achatocarpaceae ==
Achatocarpus

- Achatocarpus gracilis

== Actinidiaceae ==
Saurauia

- Saurauia serrata

== Amaranthaceae ==
Alternanthera

- Alternanthera pycnantha

Lagrezia

- Lagrezia monosperma

== Anacardiaceae ==
Astronium

- Astronium graveolens

Comocladia

- Comocladia engleriana

Cyrtocarpa

- Cyrtocarpa procera

Pistacia

- Pistacia mexicana

Pseudosmodingium

- Pseudosmodingium perniciosum

Spondias

- Spondias mombin
- Spondias purpurea

== Aquifoliaceae ==
=== Ilex ===
Ilex tolucana: Ivy

== Araliaceae ==
=== Oreopanax ===
Oreopanax xalapensis:

== Betulaceae ==
=== Alnus ===
Alnus jorullensis: Aile

== Fagaceae ==
=== Quercus ===
Quercus laurina: Encino laurelillo

== Pentaphylacacaeae ==
=== Ternstroemia ===
Ternstroemia lineata:

== Rosaceae ==
=== Prunus ===
Prunus serótina: Black Cherry

== Salicaceae ==
=== Salix ===
Salix paradoxa: Willow

== Pentaphylacacaeae ==
=== Ternstroemia ===
Ternstroemia lineata:
