= Alscher =

Alscher is a German surname. Notable people with the surname include:

- Ludger Alscher (1845–1932), German archaeologist
- Mark Dominik Alscher (born 1963), German professor
