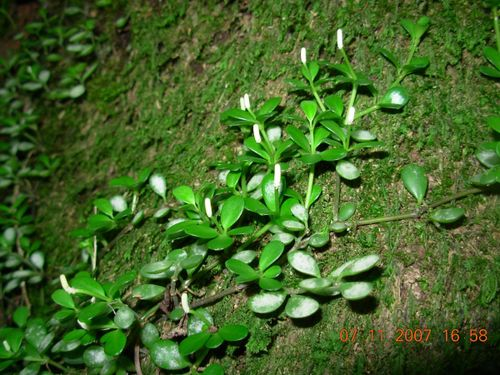

Scientific classification
- Kingdom: Plantae
- Clade: Tracheophytes
- Clade: Angiosperms
- Clade: Magnoliids
- Order: Piperales
- Family: Piperaceae
- Genus: Peperomia
- Species: P. tenerrima

Binomial name
- Peperomia tenerrima Schltdl. & Cham.

Synonyms
- Peperomia matagalpensis W.C.Burger; Peperomia schiedeana Schltdl.

= Peperomia tenerrima =

Species of flowering plant

Peperomia tenerrima is a species of epiphyte in the genus Peperomia found in parts of Central America. It primarily grows on wet tropical biomes. Its conservation status is Not Threatened.

== Description ==
The first specimens where collected in Veracruz, Mexico.

Peperomia tenerrima has stems that are ramose, creeping, and with erect branches. The leaves are glabrous, four whorled, shortly petiolate, obcordate, cornusulate, subnervular, obsoletely ciliate and pubescent. It has a single elongated spike at the tip. The branches are pollicate and bipollicate with the petiole being third and half-length of the laminae.

== Taxonomy and Naming ==
It was described in 1831 by Schltdl. & Cham. in Linnaea 6, from specimens collected by Schiede & Deppe. It got its name from the description of the leaves, which means most tender.

== Subtaxa ==
Following subtaxa are accepted.

- Peperomia tenerrima fo. robustior Dahlst.

== Distribution and Habitat ==
It is found in Central America, specifically El Salvador, Honduras, Mexico, and Nicaragua. It grows on a epiphyte environment and on wet tropical biomes.

== Conservation ==
This species is assessed as Not Threatened, in a preliminary report.
