= Fragment from the tomb of Nikarete =

Coordinates: 52°31′10″N 13°23′54″E

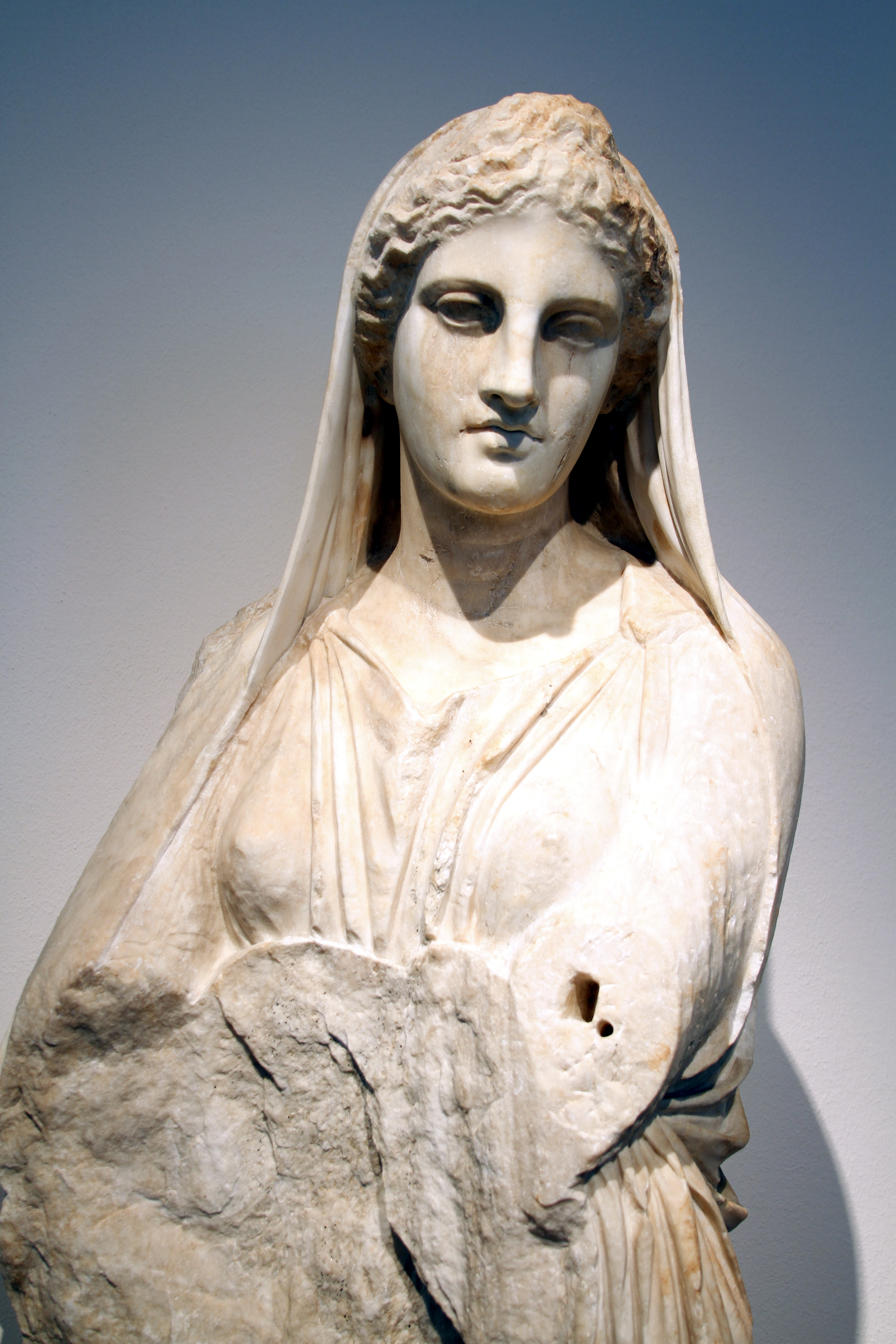

The Fragment from the tomb of Nikarete from the third quarter of the fourth century BC, found near Athens is displayed today in the Antikensammlung of the Altes Museum in Berlin.

== Description ==
The 117 cm high and 59 cm wide fragment of a grave relief made out of Pentelic marble depicts a woman named Nikarete, daughter of Ktesikles of the deme of Hagnous. Her name is preserved on a piece of the grave's gable, which was separately manufactured. Nikarete belongs to the same type of scene as the Grave relief of Thraseas and Euandria, sitting at the right hand side of the relief, looking left. She sits on a backless, cushioned stool. Her head projects from the relief and faces forward. She wears a cloak (himation) over her head. Under this she wears a chiton with flaps and buttoned sleeves. Nikarete's hair is unparted, gathered up into a knot above her forehead. There are holes in her earlobes which once contained real earrings.

It is not clear how large the complete relief was or how many other people were depicted in it. It probably belonged to one of the most elaborate grave monuments of the fourth century BC, some of which are known today. Such monuments were mostly erected by the economically successful members of the Athenian citizenry. The nose, part of the lips and the greater part of the cloak are entirely modern reconstruction, carried out in the workshop of Johann Gottfried Schadow.

== History ==
The fragments were found between Athens and the port of Piraeus. The pieces were acquired by the Baron Albert von Sack who traveled through Greece and the east with Georg Christian Gropius, then the Austrian consul in Athens and acquired a collection of ancient artefacts in the process which he later sold to the Antikensammlung in Berlin. It was one of the first ancient artworks to come to Berlin without passing through the Italian art trade.

== Bibliography ==
- Max Kunze. "Fragment vom Grabmal der Nikarete." in Staatliche Museen zu Berlin. Preußischer Kulturbesitz. Antikensammlung (Ed.): Die Antikensammlung im Pergamonmuseum und in Charlottenburg. von Zabern, Mainz 1992, ISBN 3-8053-1187-7, pp. 120f.
- "Attisches Grabmal." in Königliche Museen zu Berlin (Ed.), Alexander Conze (preliminary work): Beschreibung der antiken Skulpturen mit Ausschluss der pergamenischen Fundstücke. Spemann, Berlin 1891, urn:nbn:de:bsz:16-diglit-34567, pp. 278–279. (Verzeichnis-Nr. 740)
