= Athena with cross-strapped aegis =

Statue of the Greek goddess Athena

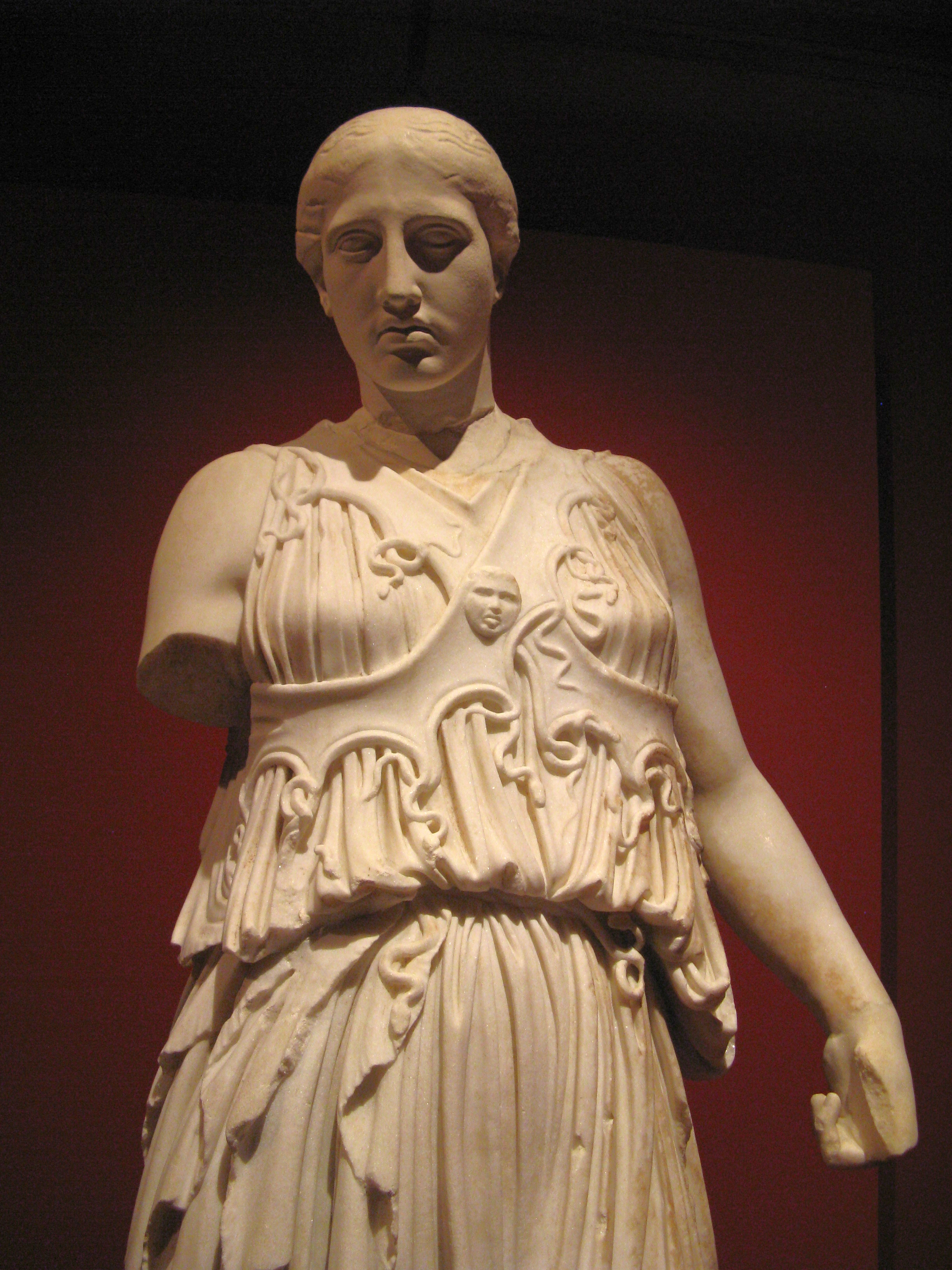
Athena with cross-banded aegis.

The Athena with cross-strapped aegis is an ancient statue of the Greek goddess Athena, which was made around AD 150 in the ancient Greek city of Pergamon. It is now displayed in the Antikensammlung Berlin (Inventory number AvP VII 22).

== History ==
The statue was found in 1880 during Carl Humann's excavations of Pergamon in the space to the west of the north stoa of the sanctuary of Athena, near the Lady of Pergamon. This area may have been the art collection (museion) of the Attalid kings. Small traces of paint were found on parts of the statue, allowing the colour of certain elements of the statue to be identified: the main body of the aegis had traces of light blue, whilst the upper hem and snakes had red traces. Details of the sides of the soles of the sandals were also still visible; they were decorated in three separate bands: the upper and lower band had ornamental decorations. The details of the upper band have been lost, but the lower band has a wavy band on a red background. Between the two ornamental bands was a third comprising one or two Egyptian blue decorative lines. Different elements of the statue have different stone textures: the skin is smooth, the peplos slightly less so; the surface of the aegis has been slightly roughened; and the sides of the soles of the sandals have hatching.

== Description ==
The statue is largely intact, except for the right arm and one fold of her drapery. The head was made separately and then attached, as were parts of the fingers. The left arm has been reconstructed from a number of fragments. The head was only found several months after the body and was more heavily corroded than the rest of the statue. It was looted by the Soviet Union and is now lost; a plaster cast sits in its place. Repairs to the statue reattached parts of the left arm and the left hand. The original neck was in fragmentary condition and plaster was added to the original head to reconstruct it.

Athena wears a girdled Doric peplos. The unusual, cross-strapped form of the aegis is the source of the statue's common name. It is formed of two separate strips which run under the arms and cross in front of the bosom and in the same space at the back. On the lower edge of the strips of the aegis there are small curves, from which small serpents emerge. These are partially carved in free relief, and are shown winding around themselves, tying themselves into knots, and striking out. Where the aegis crosses, there is a Gorgoneion depicted as a brooch. Athena's hair is tied back from the face and held in a bun at the back of the head. Based on the existence of a hole on either side of the head just below the hairline, it is possible that the statue originally had a wreathe, or that extra locks of hair were attached. The goddess carried an object in either her left arm or hand, which had also been worked separately and then attached. Comparisons to other Hellenistic sculptures suggest that the object was a shield which had been made not of marble but of at least two other, separate, materials. From the surviving top portion of the missing right arm, it is clear that it must have been bent.

The statue follows classical models of around 430/20 BC, but it was actually made in the Hellenistic period, around 150 BC. It also shares notable similarities with the Ince Athena in the National Museums Liverpool, which is dated to the late 4th century BC, although the hairstyle and headgear differ - the Athena Ince has a helmet. Nevertheless, the similarities suggest that the Athena with cross-strapped aegis is based on same type as the Athena Ince and several other models following the same type, but the original on which they are all based is currently unknown.

== Bibliography ==
- Beyer, Immo (2013). "Die Athena mit der Kreuzbandägis aus Pergamon: Kopie oder Original aus dem 5. Jh. v. Chr.?". Antike Welt. 3: 67–76.
- Niemeier, Jörg-Peter; Blume, Clarissa. "33905: Athena mit der Kreuzbandägis". Arachne. University of Cologne Archaeological Institute. Archived from the original on 25 February 2020.
- "Statue of Athena (the 'Ince Athena')". liverpoolmuseums. National Museums Liverpool. Archived from the original on 3 July 2022.
- John Boardman: Griechische Plastik. Die klassische Zeit. Philipp von Zabern, Mainz 1987, ISBN 3-8053-0818-3 (Kulturgeschichte der Antiken Welt, Band 35), p. 278
- Max Kunze: "Statue der Athena mit der 'Kreuzbandägis'," in Staatliche Museen zu Berlin. Preußischer Kulturbesitz. Antikensammlung (ed.): Die Antikensammlung im Pergamonmuseum und in Charlottenburg. von Zabern, Mainz 1992, pp. 178–179 ISBN 3-8053-1187-7
- Dagmar Grassinger: "Athena mit der 'Kreuzbandaegis'," in Dagmar Grassinger, Tiago de Oliveira Pinto and Andreas Scholl (ed.): Die Rückkehr der Götter. Berlins verborgener Olymp. Schnell + Steiner, Regensburg 2008, ISBN 978-3-7954-2113-7, p. 217
