= Grave relief of Thraseas and Euandria =

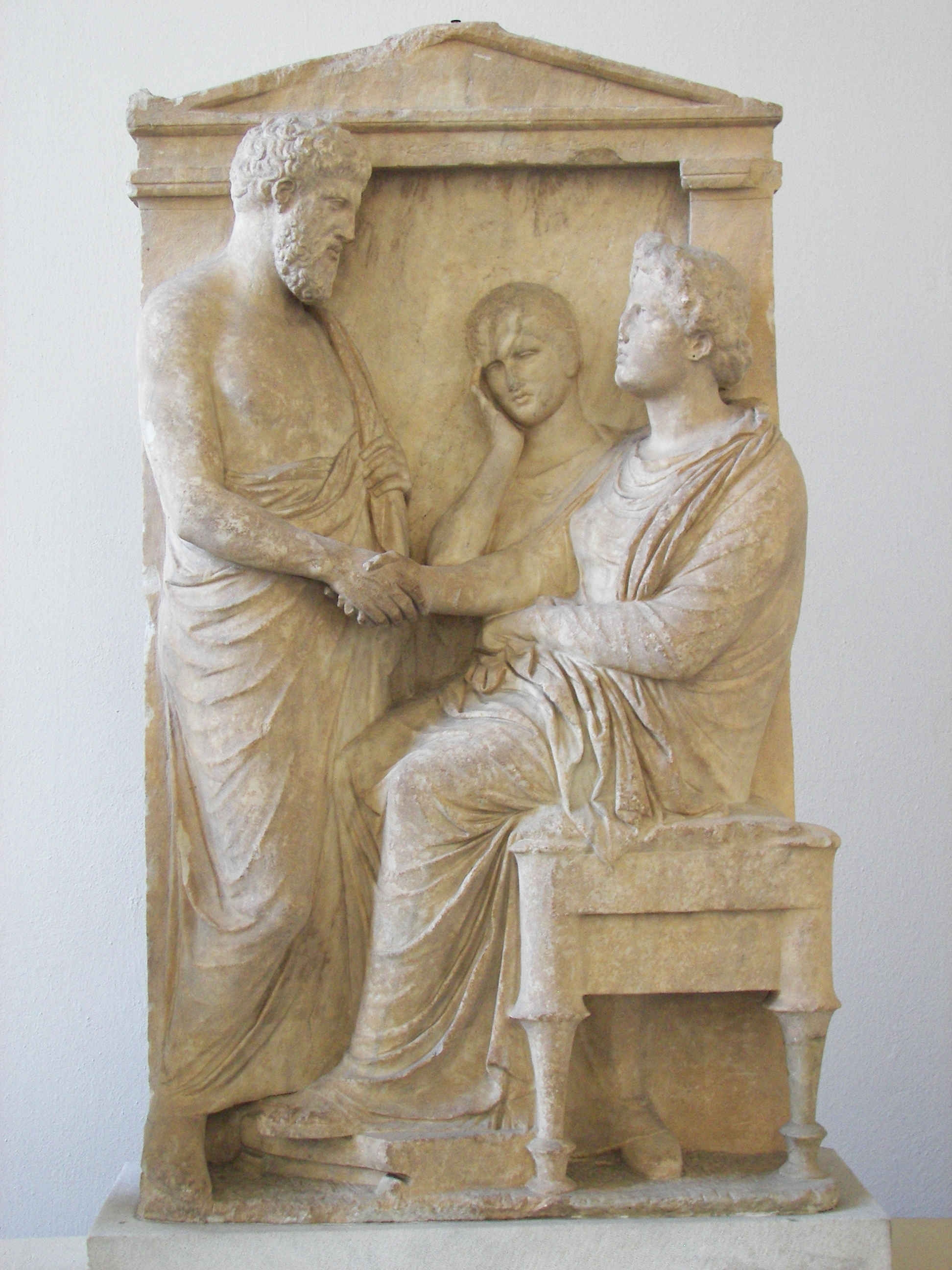

The Attic Grave relief of Thraseas and Euandria from the middle of the fourth century BC is kept in the Pergamonmuseum and belongs to the Antikensammlung Berlin.

The relief was found in Athens in the Agia Triada (i.e. in the neighbourhood of the ancient Kerameikos). It belonged to the Sabouroff collection and was acquired from this for the Antikensammlung Berlin in 1884. The stele is 160 cm high and 91 cm wide and was carved from Pentelic marble around 350-340 BC. On the architrave the main depicted individuals are identified by an inscription as Thraseas from the deme of Perithoidai and Euandria.

Grave monuments of this kind were regularly set up along streets of graves at the edges of Greek cities. The figures appear blocky. At the time of its creation, the relief was deeper and the figural depictions distinct from the background. The grave relief is an early example of this new type of depiction. The figures retain a strong, plastic liveliness.

== Description ==
In the foreground, the couple sit in front of the relief. On the left stands the bearded Thraseas, wearing a cloak. On the right sits Euandria, wearing a cloak and a chiton on a cushioned stool. She wears sandals on her feet which rest on a footstool. The two hold hands and look into each other's eyes as a symbol of their former connection and of their parting by death. A servant woman with the short hair typical of slaves is depicted with her head in her hands as a strong symbol of the household's grief. This gesture with the cheek cupped in her hand is one of deep grief, also seen in other artworks. The young slave adds further depth to the relief, since she is found in the background, otherwise worked in less detail. At the edge of the relief, a flat naiskos with antae, architrave and gable frames the scene. Three acroteria which once stood on top are now lost.

== Bibliography ==
- Elisabeth Rohde. Griechische und römische Kunst in den Staatlichen Museen zu Berlin. Henschelverlag, Berlin 1968, p. 88.
- Max Kunze. "Grabrelief des Thraseas und der Euandria" in Staatliche Museen zu Berlin. Preußischer Kulturbesitz. Antikensammlung (Ed.), Die Antikensammlung im Pergamonmuseum und in Charlottenburg. von Zabern, Mainz 1992, ISBN 3-8053-1187-7, pp. 114–115.
- "Grabrelief des Thraseas und der Euandria" in Königliche Museen zu Berlin (Ed.), Alexander Conze, Beschreibung der antiken Skulpturen mit Ausschluss der pergamenischen Fundstücke. Spemann, Berlin 1891, urn:nbn:de:bsz:16-diglit-34567, p. 277. (Verzeichnis-Nr. 738)
