= Tärnström =

Tärnström is a Swedish surname. People with the surname Tärnström include:

- Christopher Tärnström (1711–1746), Swedish naturalist and Lutheran pastor
- Dick Tärnström (born 1975), Swedish ice hockey defenceman and father of Oliver Tärnström
- Oliver Tärnström (born 2002), Swedish ice hockey forward and son of Dick Tärnström
