= Veracruz montane forests =

Tropical moist broadleaf forest ecoregion in Mexico

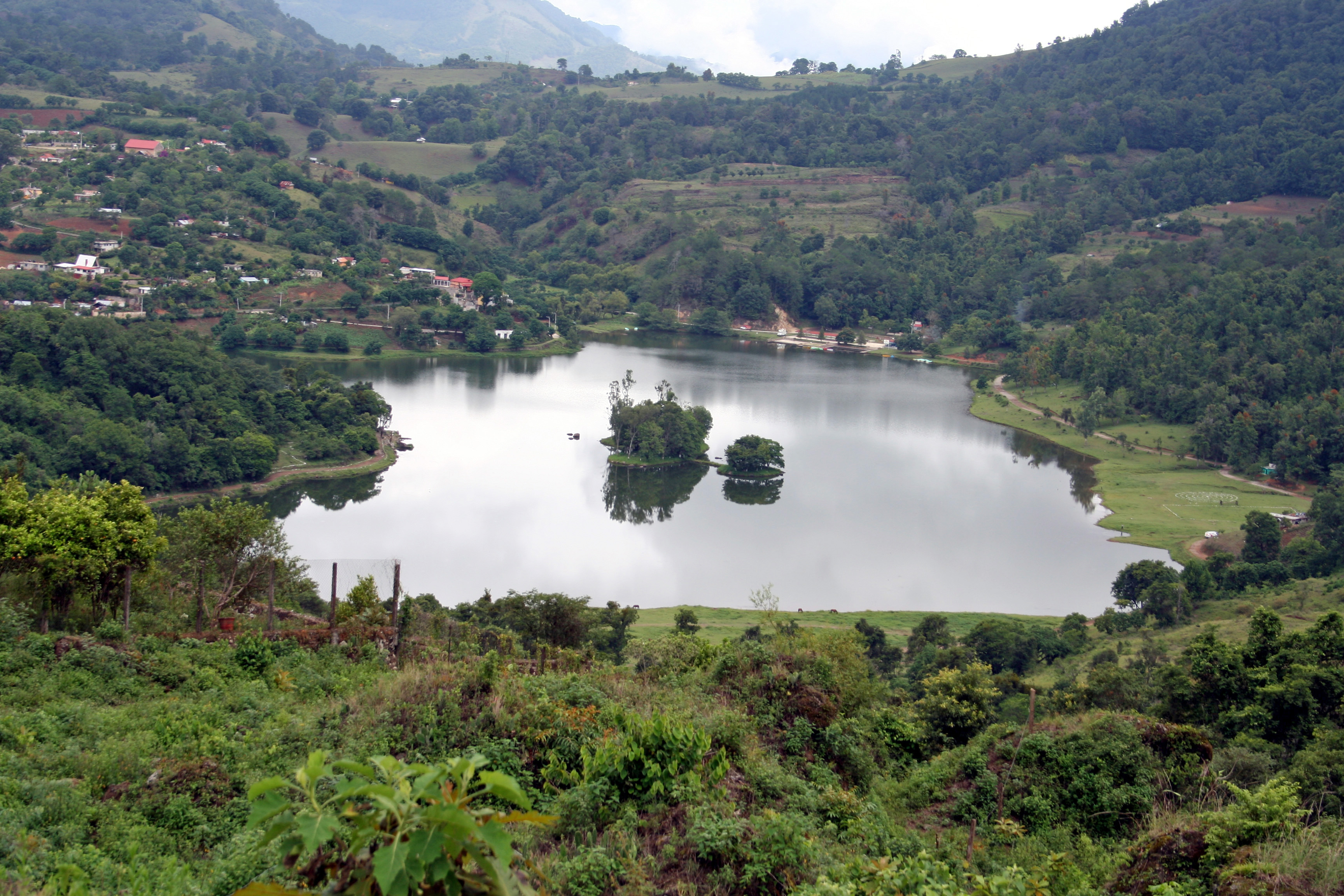
- Molango, Hidalgo, Mexico

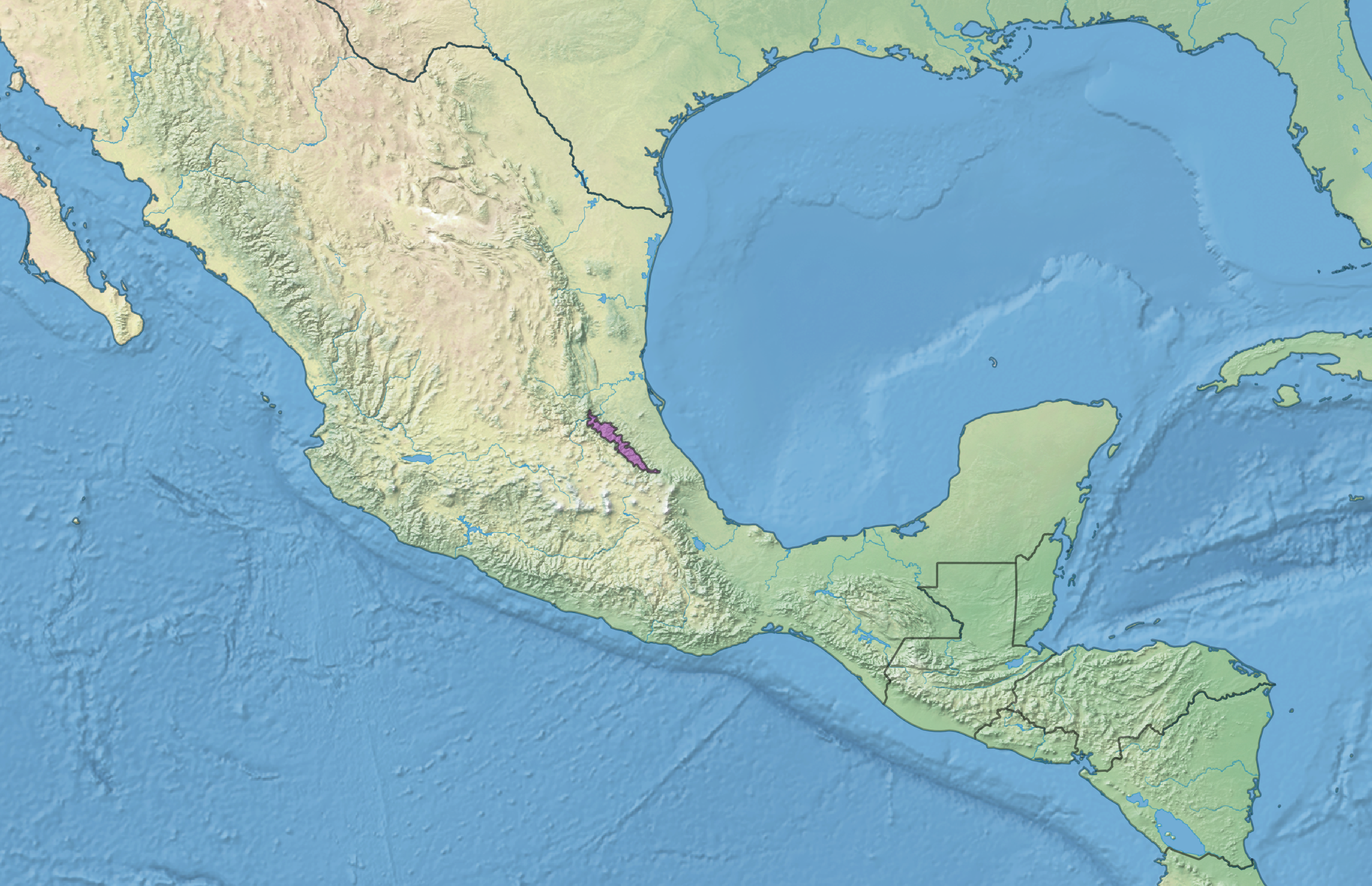
- Map of the Veracruz montane forests (purple)

Ecology
- Realm: Neotropical
- Biome: tropical and subtropical moist broadleaf forests
- Borders: Sierra Madre Oriental pine-oak forests; Trans-Mexican Volcanic Belt pine-oak forests; Veracruz moist forests

Geography
- Area: 4,942 km^{2} (1,908 mi^{2})
- Country: Mexico
- States: Hidalgo; Puebla, Veracruz

Conservation
- Conservation status: Critical/endangered
- Protected: 303 km² (6%)

The Veracruz montane forests (Spanish: Bosques montanos de Veracruz) is a tropical moist broadleaf forest ecoregion in eastern Mexico. It includes a belt of montane tropical forest on the eastern slope of the southern Sierra Madre Oriental and eastern Trans-Mexican Volcanic Belt ranges. These forests lie between the lowland Veracruz moist forests and the pine-oak forests of the higher mountains.

The Veracruz montane forests are the northernmost tropical montane moist forests in North America.

== Flora ==
The forests are composed of evergreen broadleaf trees, which form a closed canopy. Epiphytes, including orchids, bromeliads, mosses, and lichens, are abundant.

The upper and lower montane forests vary somewhat in species composition. Lower montane forests predominate between 1,250 and 1,630 meters elevation. Characteristic trees are Clethra macrophylla, Liquidambar styraciflua, and Turpinia insignis, with Quercus sartorii, Quercus xalapensis, Carpinus tropicalis, and others.

In the upper montane forests Prunus rhamnoides and Quercus corrugata are the predominant species from 1800 to 2250 meters elevation, together with Cleyera theaeoides, Ternstroemia sylvatica, Weinmannia intermedia, Clethra schlechtendalii, and others. Forests dominated by Fagus mexicana also grow in the upper montane zone, mostly between 1800 and 1900 meters elevation, with Ternstroemia sylvatica, Vaccinium leucanthum, Persea americana, and Oreopanax xalapensis.

== Fauna ==
Mammals native to the ecoregion include the six species of large cats – jaguar (Panthera onca), ocelot (Leopardus pardalus), margay (Leopardus weidii), puma (Puma concolor), jaguarundi (Herpailurus yagouaroundi), and bobcat (Lynx rufus). Hoofed mammals include the white-tailed deer (Odocoileus virginianus), red brocket (Mazama americana), and collared peccary (Tayassu tajacu). other mammals include the ringtail (Bassariscus astutus), long-tailed weasel (Neogale frenata), kinkajou (Potos flavus), tayra (Eira barbara), Mexican tree porcupine (Coendou mexicanus), nine-banded armadillo (Dasypus novemcinctus), and northern tamandua (Tamandua mexicana).

Native birds include the military macaw (Ara militaris), great curassow (Crax rubra), crested guan (Penelope purpurascens), white-crowned parrot (Pionus senilis), red-tailed hawk (Buteo jamaicensis), and many neotropical migratory birds.

== Protected areas ==
A 2017 assessment found that about 40% of the ecoregion is still forested. 303 km², or 6%, of the ecoregion is in protected areas. Protected areas include the Sierra Gorda Biosphere Reserve, Zacatepec Ecological Conservation Area, Chicamole Ecological Conservation Area, Finca Tegolome Ecological Reserve, Zona Protectora Forestal Vedada Cuenca Hidrográfica del Río Necaxa Natural Resources Protection Area (which is also a Ramsar Site), and the Cacalotepec fracción primera y fracción segunda and Área de Preservación de la Naturaleza y Zona de Usos Múltiples para el Ecoturismo Kolijke voluntary conservation areas.

== See also ==
- List of ecoregions in Mexico
