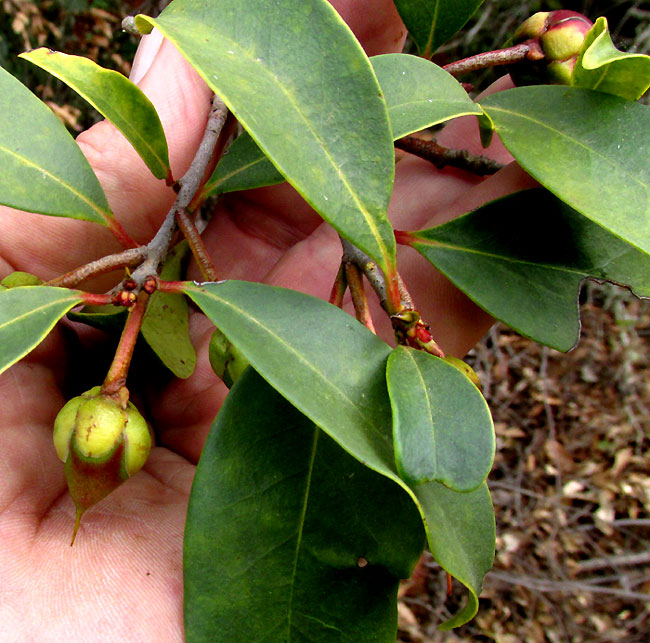
- Ternstroemia sylvatica

Scientific classification
- Kingdom: Plantae
- Clade: Embryophytes
- Clade: Tracheophytes
- Clade: Angiosperms
- Clade: Eudicots
- Clade: Asterids
- Order: Ericales
- Family: Pentaphylacaceae
- Genus: Ternstroemia
- Species: T. sylvatica

Binomial name
- Ternstroemia sylvatica Schltdl. & Cham.

Synonyms
- Mokof silvatica (Schltdl. & Cham.) Kuntze; Taonabo sylvatica (Schltdl. & Cham.) Szyszył.; Ternstroemia elliptica Choisy

= Ternstroemia sylvatica =

Species of plant

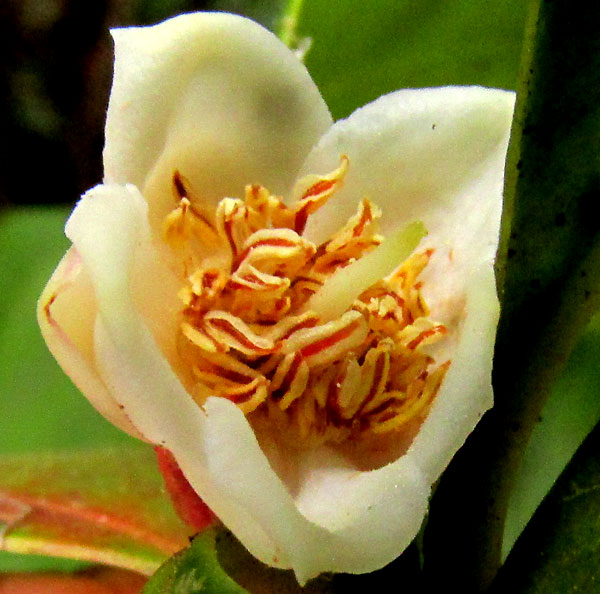
flower from above

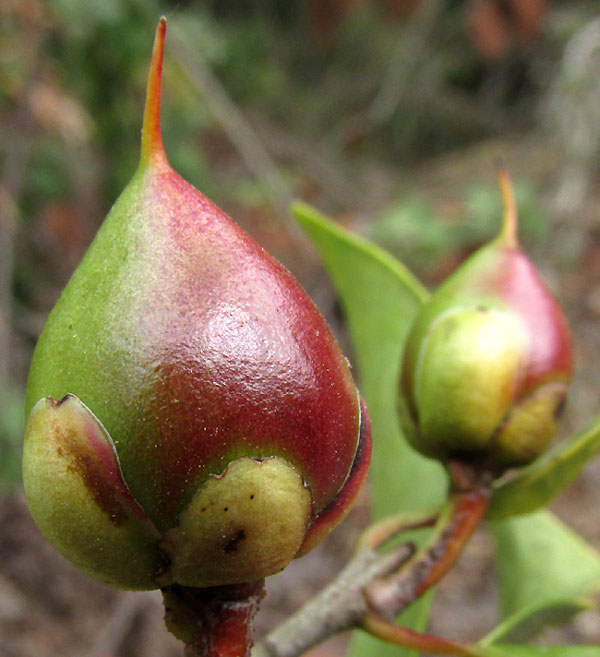
Immature fruits

Ternstroemia sylvatica, with no English name other than ternstroemia used for all Ternstroemia species, is a small tree in mountainous parts of Mexico. Currently it belongs to the family Pentaphylacaceae.

== Description ==
Ternstroemia sylvatica differs from other Ternstroemia species within its distribution area by its leaves being widest at their middle and flower peduncles being less than 1.6 cm (5/8 in) long. Beyond that, it displays the following notable features:

- It can grow up to 15 m (49 ft) high, though normally it's half that. Branch stems are grayish.
- Somewhat leathery, evergreen, hairless leaves with undivided blades arise singly on stems and crowded at the tips of branches. Petioles are up to 1.6 cm (5/8 in) long, and blades are up to 10 cm (4 in) long and up to 3.4 cm (1 1/4 in) wide. Secondary veins are hardly visible.
- Flowers on thick peduncles less than 1.6 cm (5/8 in) long arise where leaves attach to stems, either singly or in small clusters. Two rounded bracteoles about 2 mm (1/8 in) long at first glance look like large calyx lobes, but the actual calyx consists of 5 rounded, leathery lobes up to 7 mm (1/4 in) long of unequal sizes; these conspicuously persist on the developing fruit. Corollas consist of 5 rounded, white petals up to 6.5 mm (1/4 in) long. Numerous stamens occupy the flowers' centers.
- Fruits up to 2 cm (3/4 in) long are cone to egg shaped, with leathery skin.

NOTE: Published information on mature fruits at the seed dispersal stage of Ternstroemia sylvatica is scant. The Flora of China reports that fruits of some Ternstroemia species may split irregularly "... with seeds dangling and probably dispersed by birds." Further, that seeds have a fleshy, red outer layer. That appears to be what is shown below in the Gallery, which the author describes as red seeds dangling from split-open fruits.

== Distribution ==
Ternstroemia sylvatica is endemic just eastern Mexico, mainly in mountains of the Eastern Sierra Madre, the eastern Trans-Mexican Volcanic Belt, and relatively few populations in the northern part of the Southern Sierra Madre.

Within this area, Ternstroemia sylvatica occurs in discontinuous patches separated by biogeographic features, the most conspicuous being the high limestone mountains known as La Gran Sierra Plegada, which separates the northernmost population of El Cielo from populations of the Sierra Gorda in northern Querétaro, and the Moctezuma River basin, separating Sierra Gorda populations from the southern Moctezuma River ones.

== Habitat ==
In central Mexico Ternstroemia sylvatica occurs in mountainous forests with pine, oak and species of Cupressus, and cloud forests, at elevation of 1200-2700 meters (~3950-8850 feet).

== Conservation status ==
Historical and ongoing human exploitation has fragmented forest areas where Ternstroemia sylvatica occurs. For conservation purposes these regions are considered critical or of medium priority.

== Ecology ==
In central Mexico, Ternstroemia sylvatica is very common within its habitats. A study of cloud forests in northeastern Mexico found Ternstroemia sylvatica to be among the most important woody plants, with an Importance Value Index of over 10%.

Throughout the distribution area of Ternstroemia sylvatica flowers and fruits are collected for medicinal purposes. Apparently no studies have evaluated how such extraction may affect the long-term survival of natural populations.

== Traditional medicine ==
In Mexico, Ternstroemia sylvatica is used in traditional medicine for treating sleep and anxiety disorders. Three flowers are soaked in a cup of water, and a cup is drunk three times daily. In the state of Veracruz, leaves are mashed and used to make alcoholic cataplasms for treating inflammations and rheumatic processes. A study confirmed that Ternstroemia sylvatica is an iimporant anti-inflammatory and analgesic plant.

=== Toxic effects ===
On mice, clinical effects of extracts of Ternstroemia sylvatica indicate that extracts of the fruits show toxicity activity.

== Taxonomy ==
In 1830 when Diederich Franz Leonhard von Schlechtendal and Adelbert von Chamisso formally described Ternstroemia sylvatica, they based their description on plants collected by Christian Julius Wilhelm Schiede and Ferdinand Deppe, who settled in the Mexican state of Veracruz. The description includes a note that the specimens examined had been collected in the forests between Jalapa and San Andres, the latter presumably San Andrés Tuxtla. Also they had material from near San Miguel del Soldado, which must be the one in Veracruz's municipality of Rafael Lucio.

=== Etymology ===
The genus name Ternstroemia honors Christopher Tärnström, a Swedish botanist who died in 1746.

The species name sylvatica is a Latin adjecive meaning "pertaining to the forest, of or belonging to the forest, growing wild."

== Gallery ==
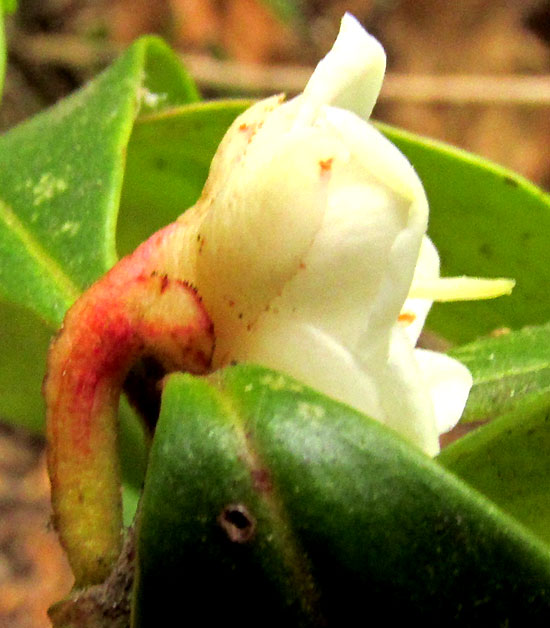
Ternstroemia sylvatica flower side view

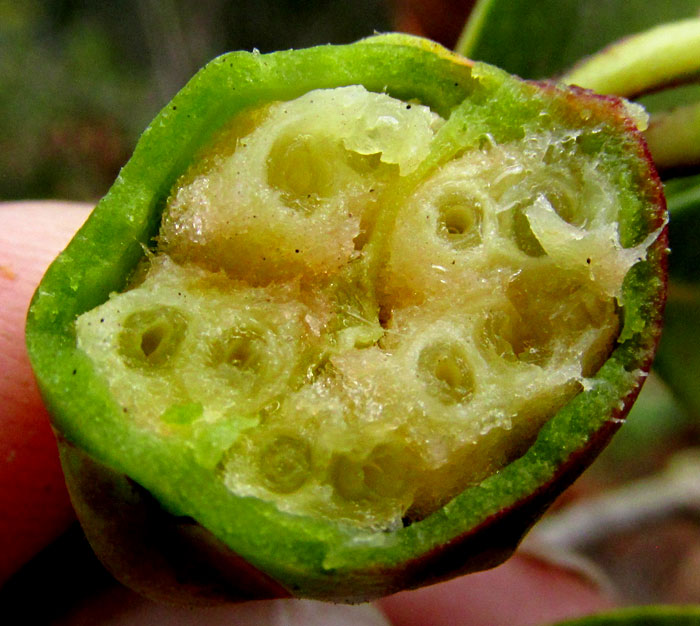
Ternstroemia sylvatica cross section of ovary

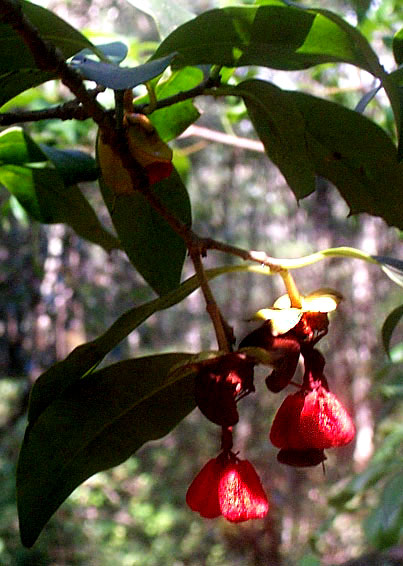
Ternstroemia sylvatica red seeds dangling from fruit

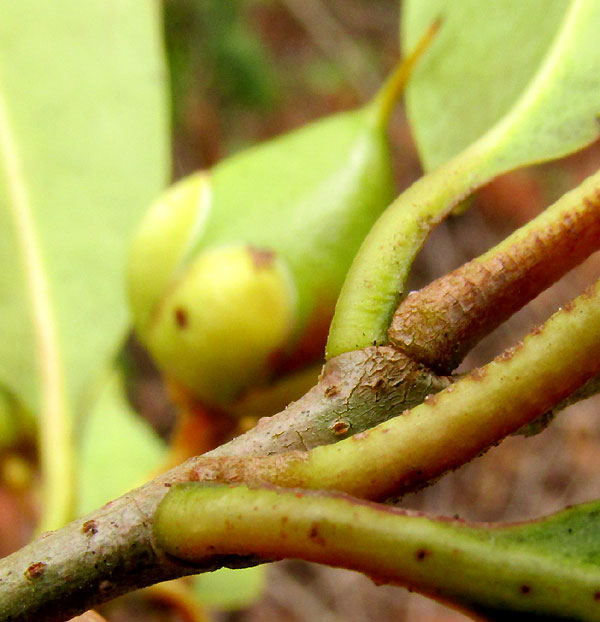
Ternstroemia sylvatica gray stem with petioles

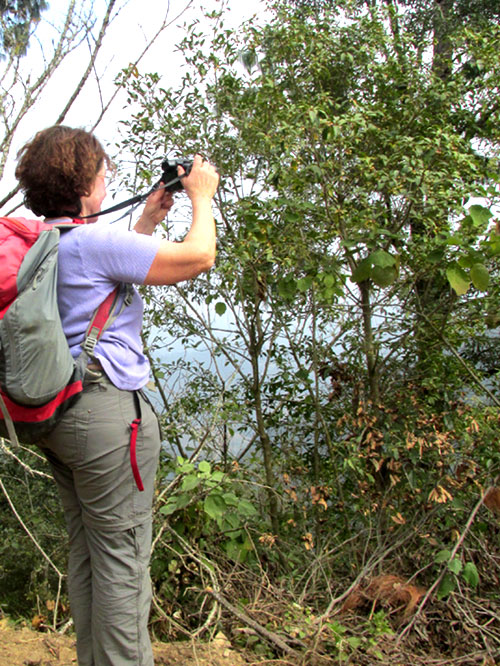
Ternstroemia sylvatica, photographing small tree in habitat
