= Ternstroemia corneri =

Conservation status
- Vulnerable (IUCN 2.3)

Scientific classification
- Kingdom: Plantae
- Clade: Tracheophytes
- Clade: Angiosperms
- Clade: Eudicots
- Clade: Asterids
- Order: Ericales
- Family: Pentaphylacaceae
- Genus: Ternstroemia
- Species: T. corneri

Binomial name
- Ternstroemia corneri H.Keng

Species of tree

Ternstroemia corneri is a species of tree in the family Pentaphylacaceae. It is endemic to Peninsular Malaysia, where it occurs in Johor. It grows in lowland swamp forests.
