= T. penangiana =

T. penangiana may refer to:

- Tainia penangiana, an Asian orchid species in genus Tainia
- Ternstroemia penangiana, a Malesian tree species
- Thelypteris penangiana, a synonym for Pronephrium penangianum, a fern species
