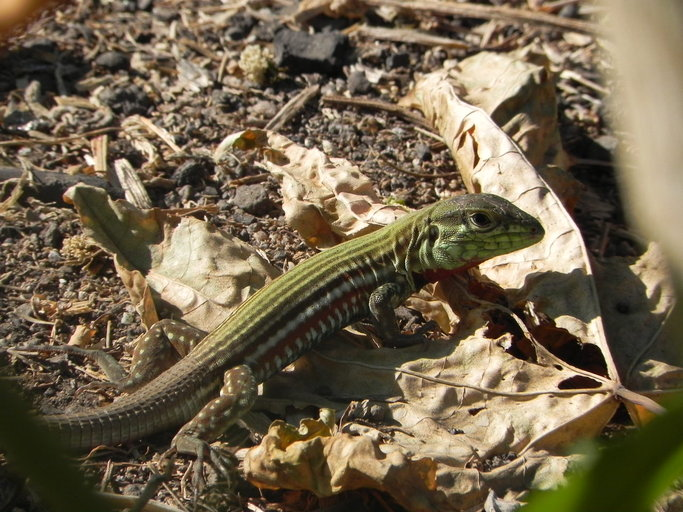

Conservation status
- Least Concern (IUCN 3.1)

Scientific classification
- Kingdom: Animalia
- Phylum: Chordata
- Class: Reptilia
- Order: Squamata
- Family: Teiidae
- Genus: Aspidoscelis
- Species: A. deppii

Binomial name
- Aspidoscelis deppii (Wiegmann, 1834)

Synonyms
- Cnemidophorus deppii Wiegmann, 1834; Cnemidophorus deppei [sic] Gadow, 1906 (ex errore); Aspidoscelis deppii — Reeder et al., 2002

= Aspidoscelis deppii =

Species of lizard

Aspidoscelis deppii, known commonly as the blackbelly racerunner, is a species of lizard in the family Teiidae. The species is native to Central America and southern Mexico. There are three recognized subspecies.

== Etymology ==
The specific name, deppii, is in honor of German naturalist Ferdinand Deppe.

== Geographic range ==
A. deppii is found in Costa Rica, El Salvador, Guatemala, Honduras, Mexico (Chiapas, Guerrero, Jalisco, Michoacán, Morelos, Oaxaca), and Nicaragua.

== Habitat ==
The preferred natural habitats of A. deppii are forest, shrubland, grassland, and rocky areas, at altitudes of 0–1,200 m (0–3,937 ft).

== Reproduction ==
A. deppii is oviparous.

== Subspecies ==
Three subspecies are recognized as being valid, including the nominotypical subspecies.

- Aspidoscelis deppii infernalis (Duellman & Wellman, 1960)
- Aspidoscelis deppii deppii (Wiegmann, 1834)
- Aspidoscelis deppii schizophorus (H.M. Smith & Brandon, 1968 )

Nota bene: A trinomial authority in parentheses indicates that the subspecies was originally described in a genus other than Aspidoscelis.
