= Ternstroemia calycina =

Conservation status
- Endangered (IUCN 2.3)

Scientific classification
- Kingdom: Plantae
- Clade: Tracheophytes
- Clade: Angiosperms
- Clade: Eudicots
- Clade: Asterids
- Order: Ericales
- Family: Pentaphylacaceae
- Genus: Ternstroemia
- Species: T. calycina

Binomial name
- Ternstroemia calycina Fawc. & Rendle

Species of flowering plant

Ternstroemia calycina is a species of flowering plant in the family Pentaphylacaceae. It is endemic to Jamaica, where it is known only from Cockpit Country. It is considered endangered.
