= Ternstroemia wallichiana =

Conservation status
- Least Concern (IUCN 3.1)

Scientific classification
- Kingdom: Plantae
- Clade: Tracheophytes
- Clade: Angiosperms
- Clade: Eudicots
- Clade: Asterids
- Order: Ericales
- Family: Pentaphylacaceae
- Genus: Ternstroemia
- Species: T. wallichiana

Binomial name
- Ternstroemia wallichiana (Griff.) Engl.

Synonyms
- Erythrochiton wallichianus Griff.; Taonabo wallichiana (Griff.) Szyszył.

Species of flowering plant

Ternstroemia wallichiana is a species of flowering plant in the family Pentaphylacaceae. It is native to an area from Bangladesh to the Lesser Sunda Islands.
