= Ternstroemia cleistogama =

Conservation status
- Endangered (IUCN 3.1)

Scientific classification
- Kingdom: Plantae
- Clade: Tracheophytes
- Clade: Angiosperms
- Clade: Eudicots
- Clade: Asterids
- Order: Ericales
- Family: Pentaphylacaceae
- Genus: Ternstroemia
- Species: T. cleistogama

Binomial name
- Ternstroemia cleistogama Kobuski

Species of flowering plant

Ternstroemia cleistogama is a species of flowering plant in the family Pentaphylacaceae. It is endemic to Ecuador, where it occurs above 2500 meters in elevation in the Andes. It has been collected only twice.
