= Gerhard Zinserling =

- Born: 11 June 1926; Erfurt, Weimar Republic
- Died: 11 November 1993 (aged 67)

Academic work
- Discipline: Archeology

Gerhard Zinserling (11 June 1926 in Erfurt – 11 November 1993) was a German classical archaeologist.

== Education and career ==
Zinserling left high school in 1944 with a Reifevermerk (certificate of maturity), to take part in the war effort. He was captured as a prisoner of war, but was released early in 1945 and enrolled in preliminary studies for university in Jena in the same year and soon completed his final examination. In 1946 he enrolled in classical archaeology, art history and prehistory at the University of Jena. In 1949 he completed the final academic exam and became an academic assistant at the archaeological institute in Jena. His studies came to an end in 1950, when he received his doctorate from Ludger Alscher and Friedrich Zucker. His dissertation was entitled Die Stilentwicklung der stadtrömischen Porträtkunst vom Ausgang des zweiten Jahrhunderts n. Chr. bis zum Beginn der Spätantike (The Stylistic Development of Portraiture in the City of Rome from the End of the Second Century AD until the Beginning of late antiquity).

He was then made an acting lecturer. In March 1956 he completed his habilitation from Robert Heidenreich und Horst Kusch at the same location with the work Die Stilentwicklung der stadtrömischen Porträtkunst vom Ausgang des zweiten Jahrhunderts n. Chr. bis zum Beginn der Spätantike (The Stylistic Development of Portraiture in the City of Rome from the End of the Second Century AD until the Beginning of late antiquity), which was a continuation of the studies he had carried out for his doctorate. In September 1956 he became an ordinary lecturer, from June 1960 he was a professor with lectureship and from February 1963 a professor with full lectureship. Finally, in September 1969, Zinserling was appointed chair of classical archaeology at Jena, where he continued to teach until his retirement in 1991.

== Research and personal life ==
Zinserling is best known for his handbook Abriss der griechischen und römischen Kunst (Outline of Greek and Roman Art), which received five editions in the DDR. He first married art historian Liselotte Honigmann-Zinserling and then classical archaeologist Verena Paul-Zinserling.

== Selected works ==
- Abriss der griechischen und römischen Kunst (Outline of Greek and Roman Art), Reclam, Leipzig 1970 (Reclams Universal-Bibliothek, Bd. 435)

== Bibliography ==
- Lothar Mertens: Das Lexikon der DDR-Historiker. Saur, München 2006, ISBN 3-598-11673-X, pp. 663–664.
