= Ternstroemia landae =

Conservation status
- Least Concern (IUCN 3.1)

Scientific classification
- Kingdom: Plantae
- Clade: Tracheophytes
- Clade: Angiosperms
- Clade: Eudicots
- Clade: Asterids
- Order: Ericales
- Family: Pentaphylacaceae
- Genus: Ternstroemia
- Species: T. landae

Binomial name
- Ternstroemia landae Standley & L.O. Williams

Species of flowering plant

Ternstroemia landae is a species of plant in the Pentaphylacaceae family. It is endemic to Honduras.
