= Ternstroemia bullata =

Conservation status
- Critically Endangered (IUCN 2.3)

Scientific classification
- Kingdom: Plantae
- Clade: Tracheophytes
- Clade: Angiosperms
- Clade: Eudicots
- Clade: Asterids
- Order: Ericales
- Family: Pentaphylacaceae
- Genus: Ternstroemia
- Species: T. bullata

Binomial name
- Ternstroemia bullata Proctor

Species of tree

Ternstroemia bullata is a species of tree in the family Pentaphylacaceae. It is endemic to Jamaica. It is a critically endangered species with only two remaining individuals known, both in Clarendon Parish.
