= Ternstroemia polypetala =

Conservation status
- Vulnerable (IUCN 2.3)

Scientific classification
- Kingdom: Plantae
- Clade: Tracheophytes
- Clade: Angiosperms
- Clade: Eudicots
- Clade: Asterids
- Order: Ericales
- Family: Pentaphylacaceae
- Genus: Ternstroemia
- Species: T. polypetala

Binomial name
- Ternstroemia polypetala Melchior

Species of flowering plant

Ternstroemia polypetala is a species of plant in the Pentaphylacaceae family. It is found in Cameroon, Malawi, and Tanzania. Its natural habitat is subtropical or tropical dry forests. It is threatened by habitat loss.
