= Albert von Sack =

German explorer (1757–1829)

Sebastian Albert Graf von Sack (1757 – August 1829) was a German explorer and a chamberlain of Prussian nobility.

Sebatian Albert Freiherr von Sack was born in Eichholz, Liegnitz, Silesia. In 1805 he travelled to Surinam, where he made observations of the fauna, flora and local customs of the population. On his return journey back to Europe, he visited Washington DC, Philadelphia, New York City, Boston, et al. As a result of his travels he published Beschreibung einer Reise nach Surinam und des Aufenthaltes daselbst in den Jahren 1805, 1806, 1807 sowie von Rückkehr des Verfassers nach Europa über Nord-Amerika. In 1810 this treatise was translated into English as "A narrative of a voyage to Surinam; of a residence there during 1805-1807; and of the authors return to Europe by the way of North America".

In 1817 Baron von Sack undertook a scientific mission to Egypt and the Middle East with poet Wilhelm Müller (1794–1827), and in 1820, on an expedition with Austrian consul Georg Christian Gropius (1781–1854), he procured the "Fragment from the tomb of Nikarete" in Athens. This antiquity is now housed in the Antikensammlung in Berlin.

In June 1821 he was honored with the title of Graf (count).

In 1824 he accompanied William Bullock (1773–1849) and Ferdinand Deppe (1794–1861) to Mexico in order to collect natural history specimens for the Berlin Museum. He died in Berlin.

A species of Mexican lizard, Aspidoscelis sackii, is named in his honor.

== Sources ==
- Parts of this article are based on a translation of an equivalent article at the German Wikipedia.
