= Perithoedae =

Coordinates: 37°59′45″N 23°40′38″E

Perithoedae or Perithoidai (Ancient Greek: Περιθοῖδαι) was a deme of ancient Attica, of the phyle Oineïs; it provided three delegates to the Athenian Boule.

The site of Perithoedae is located in the Kephisos valley, west of modern Athens.

== People ==
- Thraseas and Euandria, whose grave relief is preserved in the Pergamon Museum, Berlin
