= Ludger Alscher =

German archaeologist

Ludger Alscher (11 April 1916, in Münster – 9 November 1985, in Berlin-Köpenick) was a German classical archaeologist, who could be considered the most significant scholar of his subject area in the DDR.

== Life ==
Ludger Alscher studied ancient history and classical archaeology from 1936, first at the University of Münster and then at the Ludwig-Maximilians-Universität München (LMU) from 1939. Archaeology quickly became the primary focus of his studies, thanks especially to the influence of his teacher at Münster, Friedrich Matz the Younger. In Munich, he was mainly influenced by Ernst Buschor. In 1942, he received his doctorate for a work on depictions of Nike in the round completed at Munich.

From 1945, Alscher led the establishment of the archaeological institute at the University of Jena, which he was director of until 1951. During this period, Alscher achieved his habilitation, in 1950, with a work on early Greek minor sculpture. The work was the first part of a multi-volume work on Greek sculpture, Griechische Plastik. In 1951, Alscher was hired by the Humboldt University of Berlin, where he taught as a lecturer until 1952, a lecturing professor until 1953 and as chair thereafter. In 1968 his chair was incorporated into the research area of Aesthetics and Art History. On the one hand, this ran against Alscher's interests, but on the other hand he had to accept that classical archaeology at Humboldt University at this time was in trouble. Most of the department's space had been lost, and the subject was being reduced to an insignificant specialisation by political pressures. Nevertheless, Alscher as head of the department was one of the leading scholars of classical archaeology in the DDR. Along with such scholars as Gottfried von Lücken, Carl Blümel, Elisabeth Rohde and Gerhard Zinserling he was one of the most influential voices in his subject. In 1985, he died unexpectedly. His successor at Humboldt University was his student and long-term colleague Wolfgang Schindler. A large portion of the young archaeologists of the DDR were direct or indirect students of Alscher.

Alscher focussed on the archaeological remnants of Greco-Roman antiquity. At the beginning of his time in Berlin, he restored the newly renamed Classical Archaeology Institute with scarce resources. This included the Institute's library which had to be assembled from scratch using old stocks and the library of Gerhart Rodenwaldt. In this he was supported for a long time by his two research assistants, Evamaria Schmidt and Wolfgang Schindler. His magnum opus was a five-part account of Greek sculpture in six volumes (I [1954], II/1 [1961], II/2 [1982, 1963], III [1956], IV [1957]). The long delay of volume II/2 resulted from increasing new information on the so-called Boston Throne and from health issues, which long troubled Alscher. He subsequently worked on a three-part continuation on Roman portraiture, of which only the first volume was published. Alscher approached the archaeological objects through form analysis. In his work, the significance and function of the objects under consideration was critical. In his research he united the insights and break-throughs of his teachers Metz and Buschor.

According to Archäologenbildnisse, Alscher was the most important German-speaking classical archaeologist of the post-war period.

== Selected writings ==
- Griechische Plastik. Bd. 1. Monumentale Plastik und ihre Vorstufen in der griechischen Frühzeit (Greek Sculpture: Vol 1. Monumental Sculpture and its Precursors in the Early Greek Period), Verlag der Wissenschaften, Berlin 1954
- Griechische Plastik. Bd. 2/I. Archaik und die Wandlung zur Klassik (Greek Sculpture: Vol 2/I. Archaic and the Transition to the Classical Period), Verlag der Wissenschaften, Berlin 1961
- Griechische Plastik. Bd. 2/II. Klassik (Greek Sculpture: Vol 2/II. Classical), Verlag der Wissenschaften, Berlin 1982
- Griechische Plastik. Bd. 2/II Ergänzungsband. Götter vor Gericht. Das Fälschungsproblem des Bostoner "Throns", die klassisch-griechische Kunst und die Archäologen (Greek Sculpture: Vol 2/II Supplement. Gods at Law. The Authenticity of the Boston "Throne", Classical Greek Art and Archaeology), Verlag der Wissenschaften, Berlin 1963
- Griechische Plastik. Bd. 3. Nachklassik und Vorhellenismus (Greek Sculpture: Vol 3. Post-Classical and Early Hellenistic), Verlag der Wissenschaften, Berlin 1956
- Griechische Plastik. Bd. 4. Hellenismus (Greek Sculpture: Vol 4. Hellenistic), Verlag der Wissenschaften, Berlin 1957
- (Editor): Lexikon der Kunst in 5 Bänden. Architektur, bildende Kunst, angewandte Kunst, Industrieformgestaltung, Kunsttheorie (Lexikon of Art in 5 Volumes. Architecture, Fine Arts, Applied Arts, Shaping of Industry, Art Theory) Seemann, Leipzig 1968–1978.

== Bibliography ==
- Wolfgang Schindler: Ludger Alscher zum 65. Geburtstag, Ethnographisch-Archäologische Zeitschrift 22 (1981), pp. 81–84.
- Wolfgang Schindler: Ludger Alscher †, Gnomon 59 (1987), S. 571–572.
- Wolfgang Schindler: Ludger Alscher, in Reinhard Lullies and Wolfgang Schiering (Edd.): Archäologenbildnisse. Zabern, 2nd Edition, Mainz 1991. pp. 319–320. ISBN 3-8053-0971-6
