= Ternstroemia granulata =

Conservation status
- Critically Endangered (IUCN 2.3)

Scientific classification
- Kingdom: Plantae
- Clade: Tracheophytes
- Clade: Angiosperms
- Clade: Eudicots
- Clade: Asterids
- Order: Ericales
- Family: Pentaphylacaceae
- Genus: Ternstroemia
- Species: T. granulata

Binomial name
- Ternstroemia granulata Krug & Urb.

Species of flowering plant

Ternstroemia granulata is a species of plant in the Pentaphylacaceae family. It is endemic to Jamaica.
