= Ternstroemia penangiana =

Conservation status
- Least Concern (IUCN 3.1)

Scientific classification
- Kingdom: Plantae
- Clade: Tracheophytes
- Clade: Angiosperms
- Clade: Eudicots
- Clade: Asterids
- Order: Ericales
- Family: Pentaphylacaceae
- Genus: Ternstroemia
- Species: T. penangiana

Binomial name
- Ternstroemia penangiana Choisy

Synonyms
- Mokof penangiana (Choisy) Kuntze; Adinandra bancana (Miq.) King ex B.D.Jacks. Adinandra miquelii King; Ternstroemia bancana Miq.

Species of flowering plant

Ternstroemia penangiana is a species of plant in the Pentaphylacaceae family. It is found in Indonesia, Malaysia, and Singapore. It is threatened by habitat loss.
