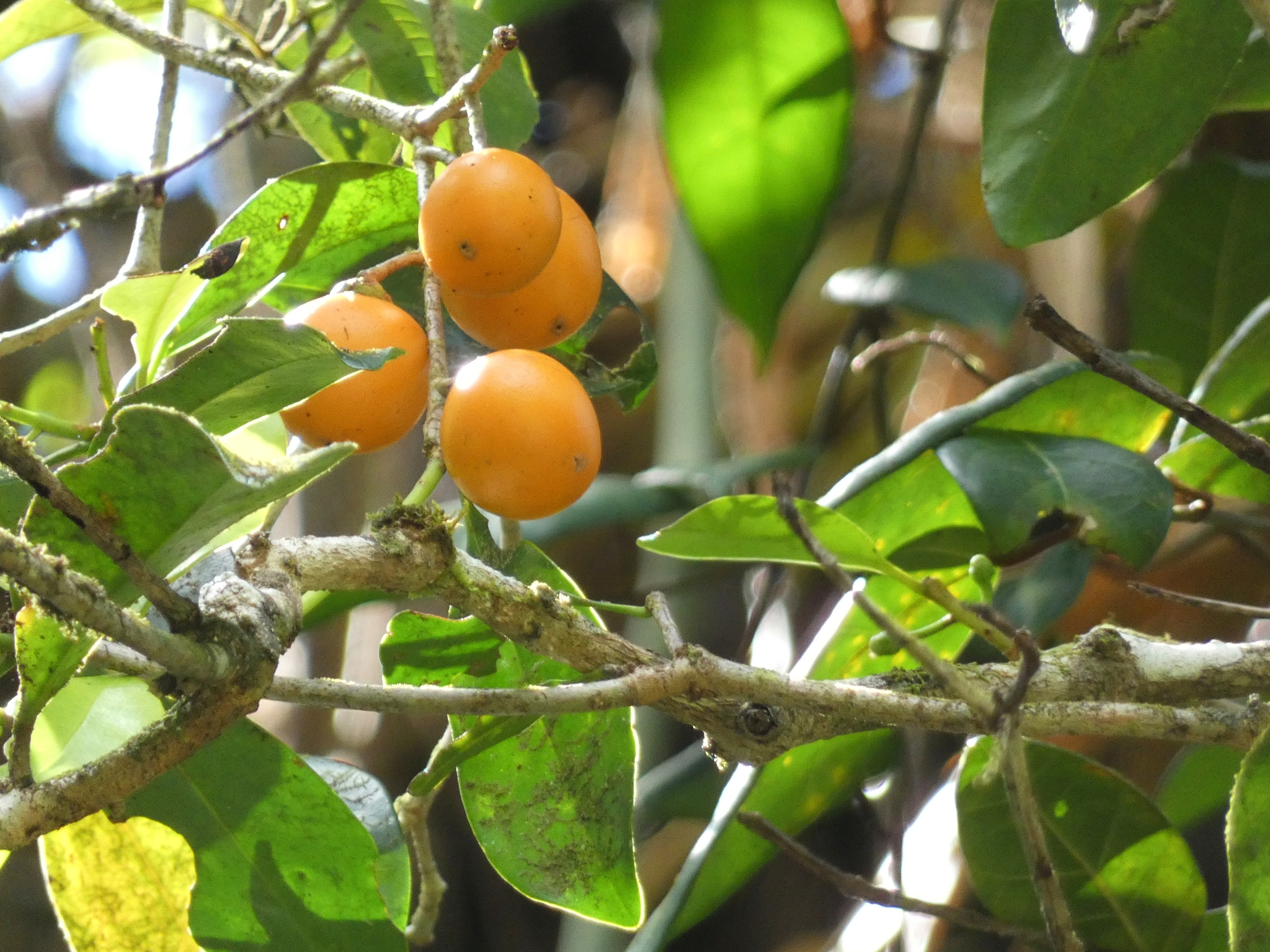
- With ripe fruit

Conservation status
- Least Concern (IUCN 3.1)
- Least Concern (NCA)

Scientific classification
- Kingdom: Plantae
- Clade: Tracheophytes
- Clade: Angiosperms
- Clade: Eudicots
- Clade: Asterids
- Order: Ericales
- Family: Pentaphylacaceae
- Genus: Ternstroemia
- Species: T. cherryi

Binomial name
- Ternstroemia cherryi (F.M.Bailey) Merr. ex J.F.Bailey & C.T.White

Synonyms
- Garcinia cherryi F.M.Bailey; Ternstroemia rehderiana Kobuski

= Ternstroemia cherryi =

Species of flowering plant

Ternstroemia cherryi, commonly known as cherry beech, is a species of plant in the family Pentaphylacaceae. It is a small rainforest tree native to New Guinea and to tropical parts of the Northern Territory and Queensland in Australia.

== Description ==
Ternstroemia cherryi is an understory tree to 20 m (66 ft) tall which may be buttressed. Leaves are simple and are arranged in pairs or whorls. They can reach 16 cm (6.3 in) in length and 6 cm (2.4 in) in width and are somewhat fleshy with only the main lateral veins visible.

Flowers occur singly on the twigs below the leaves. They are white or cream, about 20 mm (0.8 in) diameter, actinomorphic, bisexual, with five petals and sepals, about 100 stamens and a single style.

The fruit is a yellow or orange capsule about 3 cm (1.2 in) diameter and up to 5 cm (2.0 in) long. They contain several seeds which are about 20 mm (0.8 in) long and are covered in a red aril.

== Distribution and habitat ==
This species inhabits rainforest throughout New Guinea (including the Bismarck Archipelago), in the northern part of the Northern Territory in and around Kakadu National Park, and in coastal and sub-coastal Queensland from about Tully to the islands of the Torres Strait. In Australia it occurs at altitudes up to about 800 m (2,600 ft).

== Conservation ==
As of May 2026, this species has been assessed to be of least concern by the International Union for Conservation of Nature and by the Queensland Government under its Nature Conservation Act.

== Uses ==
In New Guinea, the bark was boiled to make a preparation for treating heartburn and headaches.

== Gallery ==
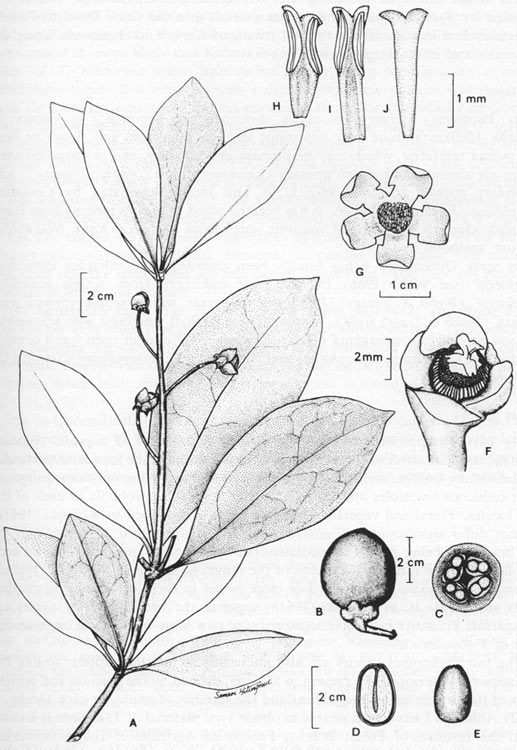
Botanical sketch

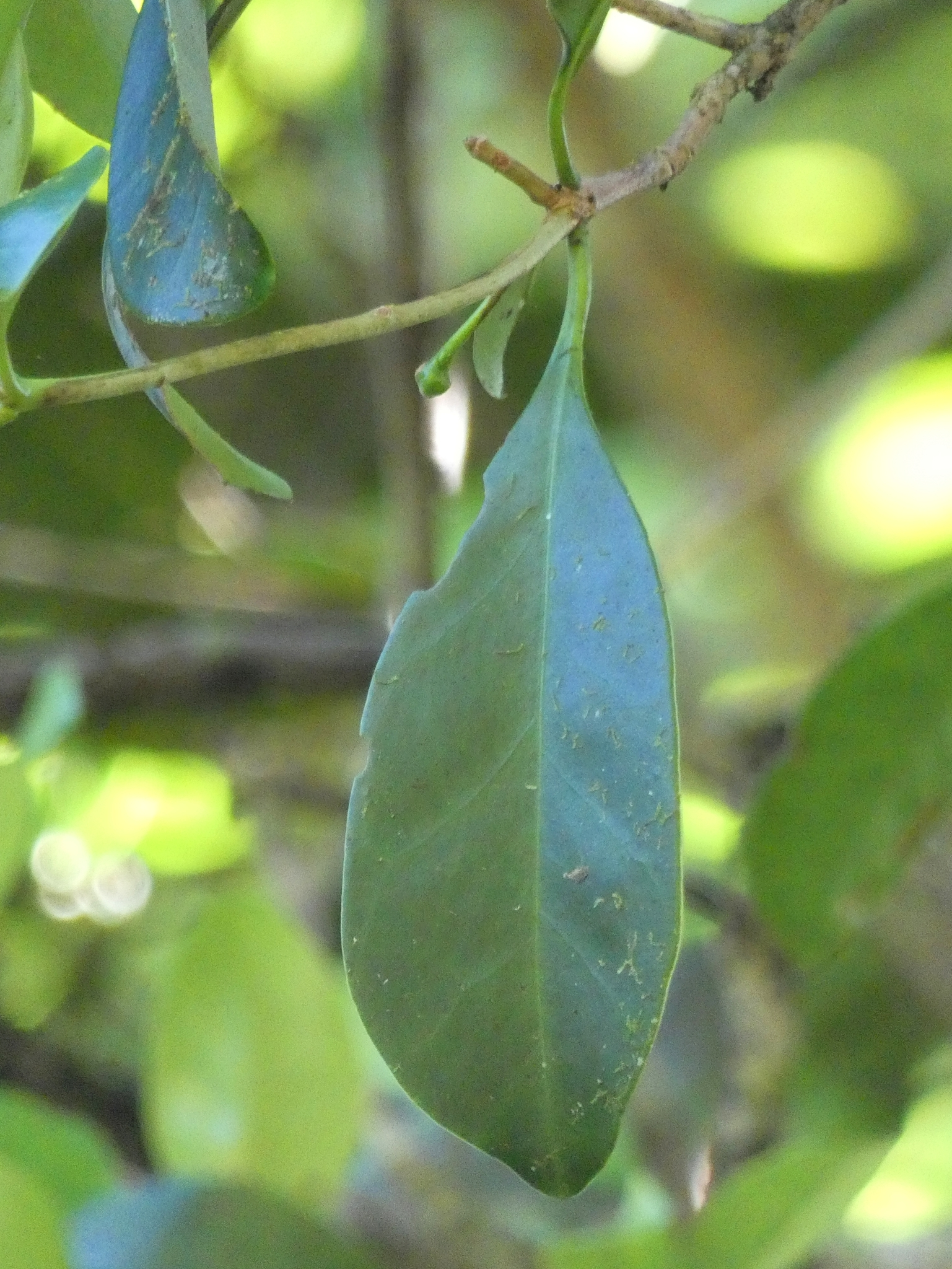
Leaf

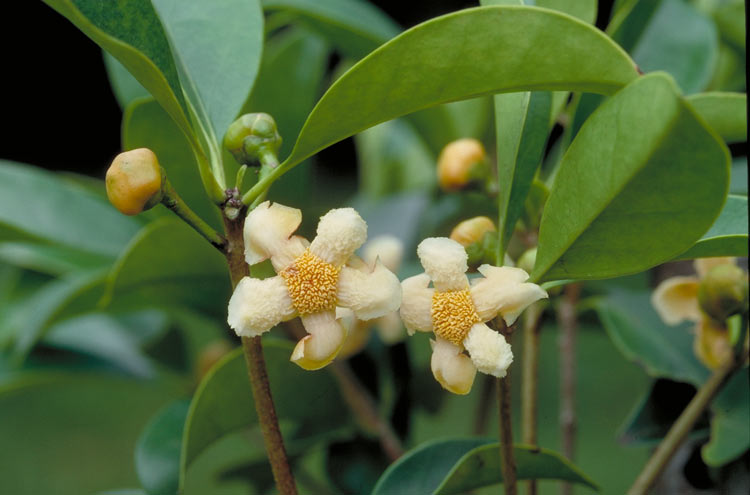
Flowers
