= Mark Dominik Alscher =

German physician

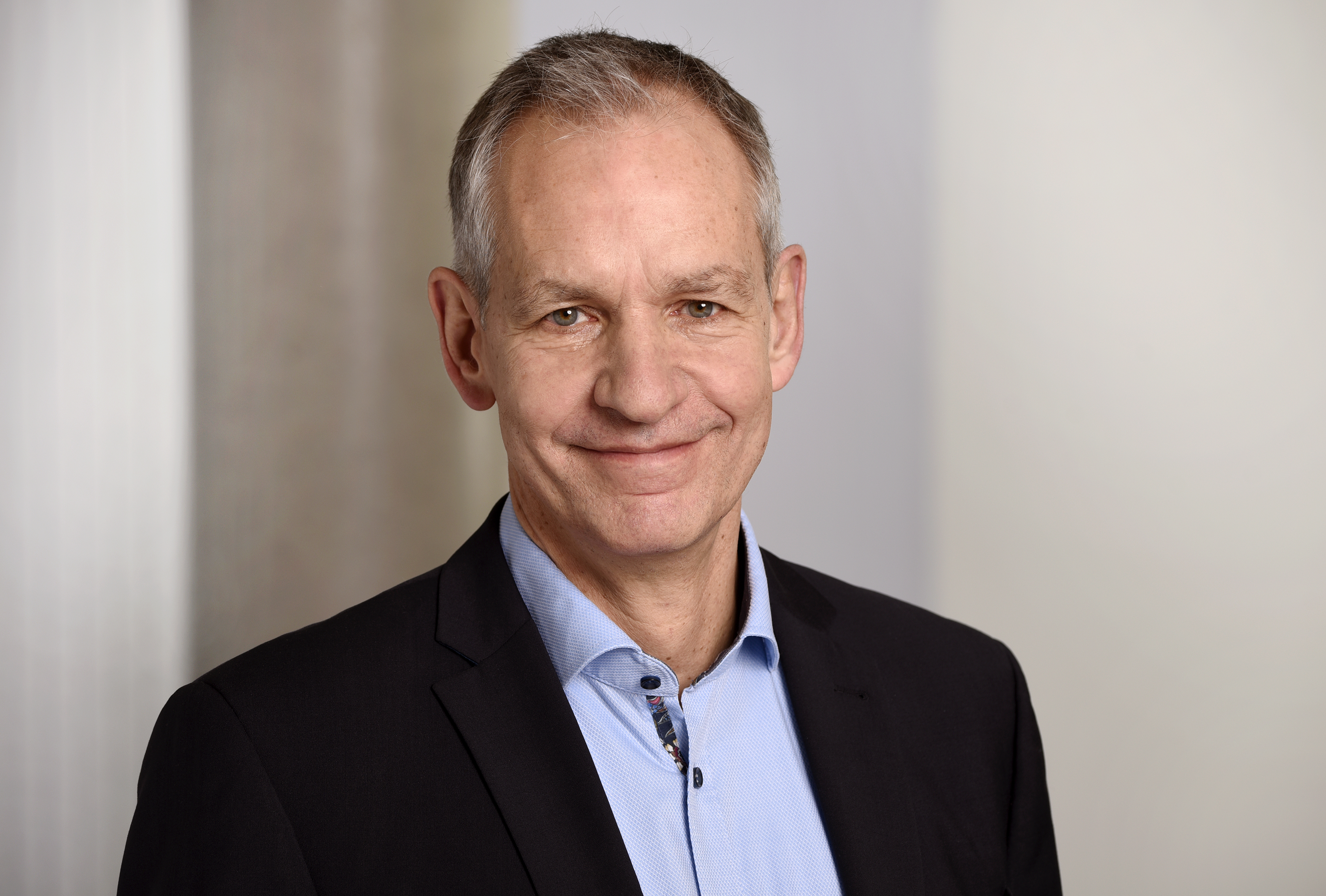
Mark Dominik Alscher (2022)

Mark Dominik Alscher (born 2 August 1963) is a German physician, managing director of Bosch Health Campus Stuttgart and distinguished professor at University of Tübingen. He is known for his work in the field of peritoneal dialysis, acute renal failures and medical expert systems.

== Life ==
Alscher studied medicine at the Albert-Ludwigs-Universität Freiburg from 1984 to 1990. In 1990, he obtained a PhD in human medicine (magna cum laude); his dissertation's topic was: "Iron, copper and zinc concentrations of the liver and their significance for computed tomographic liver density measurements". He received his medical licence in 1992 and moved to the Robert Bosch Hospital (RBK) Stuttgart in the department of gastroenterology. He underwent training as an internist with rotations in gastroenterology, cardiology, haematology and nephrology. In 1996, Alscher worked at the RBK in the Department of General Internal Medicine and Nephrology. The following year he completed his specialist training in internal medicine and was appointed senior physician in 1998.

From 1998, he worked at Beth Israel Deaconess Medical Center and Harvard Medical School (US), and in 2001 at University Hospital Denver (US). He was awarded the specialty designation Nephrologist (2002) and Hypertensiologist (2004). In 2003, he was habilitated at the University of Tübingen and appointed consultant in 2004. In 2007, Alscher took over the provisional management of the emergency room centre at the RBK. In 2008, the University of Tübingen appointed him as an associate professor. In the same year, he finally became head physician of the emergency admission centre and the department of general internal medicine and nephrology at the RBK. In 2009, he was elected medical director of the RBK's overall clinics.

In 2011, Alscher became chairman of the AG Telematik of the Ministry of Science and the Ministry of Social Affairs of Baden-Württemberg. After the Gesundheitstelematik research group was founded in the Ministry of Science, Research and the Arts (MWK) Baden-Württemberg in 2012, he was elected its chairman in 2013. In 2014, he was a subject expert of the Gemeinsamer Bundesausschuss in Berlin.

In 2016 he became Managing Medical Director of Robert-Bosch-Krankenhaus GmbH, the Robert Bosch Gesellschaft für Medizinische Forschung (RBMF) and the MVZ (Medizinisches Versorgungszentrum) society at RBK.

During the founding of the Bosch Health Campus, Alscher managed it together with Luise Hölscher, who resigned from the management in 2021. Since then, Alscher has been the sole managing director. On 1 April 2022, the Bosch Health Campus was officially opened.

== Scientific work ==
Alscher has worked particularly in the field of peritoneal dialysis, systematically working on the clinical picture of encapsulating peritoneal dialysis. Mortality, which was previously 85%, was reduced to 19.4% in treated patients. Another focus is on medical expert systems (computer programs that can assist physicians in solving more complex problems like an expert by deriving recommended actions from a knowledge base), the analysis of which, together with physicians from the US and Sweden, has led to several papers. Alscher has organised several symposia and annual congresses, including the Southwest German Society for Internal Medicine 2014 in Stuttgart and the annual meeting of the German Society for Nephrology in Berlin 2016.

Furthermore, he advocates in the areas of framework conditions for clinical research, new health professions and software for knowledge organisations.

== Memberships and scientific associations ==
- Board member of the Institute for Digital Medicine
- Member of the scientific advisory board of the Robert Bosch Stiftung since 05/2004. (Stuttgart)
- Fellow of the American Society of Nephrology (FASN) since 2007.
- Vice President of the German Society of Nephrology
- Chairman of the AG Gesundheitstelematik in the Ministry of Science, Research and the Arts (MWK) Baden-Württemberg since 06/2013.
- Technical expert of the Federal Joint Committee (Berlin) since 08/2014.
- Chairman of the Southwest German Society of Internal Medicine since 09/2015
- Advisory board of the Coordination Office Telemedicine Baden-Württemberg (BW) since 07/2015.
- President of the German Society of Nephrology
- Chairman of the Digital Health Baden-Württemberg e.V.
- International Society of Nephrology
- National Kidney Foundation, USA
- International Society of Peritoneal Dialysis
- European Renal Association – European Dialysis and TransplantationAssociation
- German Society for Internal Medicine
- German Society for Interdisciplinary Emergency Departments
- German Working Group for Clinical Nephrology
- Member of the Digital Advisory Board and spokesperson for digitisation topics of the Ministry of Social Affairs Baden-Württemberg
- Delegate of the State and District Medical Association of Baden-Württemberg

== Publications ==
Alscher has published more than 330 scientific articles and book chapters with the main focus on kidney diseases incl. Renal replacement (peritoneal dialysis, haemodialysis, transplantation), systemic diseases, rheumatic diseases and emergency care. He also gave over 500 external lectures.

Books

- Reference Nephrology. Thieme Verlag. 2019. ISBN 978-3-13-240001-6.
- With Götz Geldner: Handbuch Extrakorporale Organunterstützung. Urban & Fischer Publishers. 2019. ISBN 978-3-437-22791-2.
- With Ulrich Kuhlmann, Joachim Böhler, Friedrich C. Luft and Ulrich Kunzendorf: Nephrology: Pathophysiology – Clinic – Renal Replacement Procedures. Thieme Verlag. 2015. ISBN 978-3-13-700206-2.

Scientific articles

- PubMed publication directory (incomplete).
- ResearchGate publication directory
