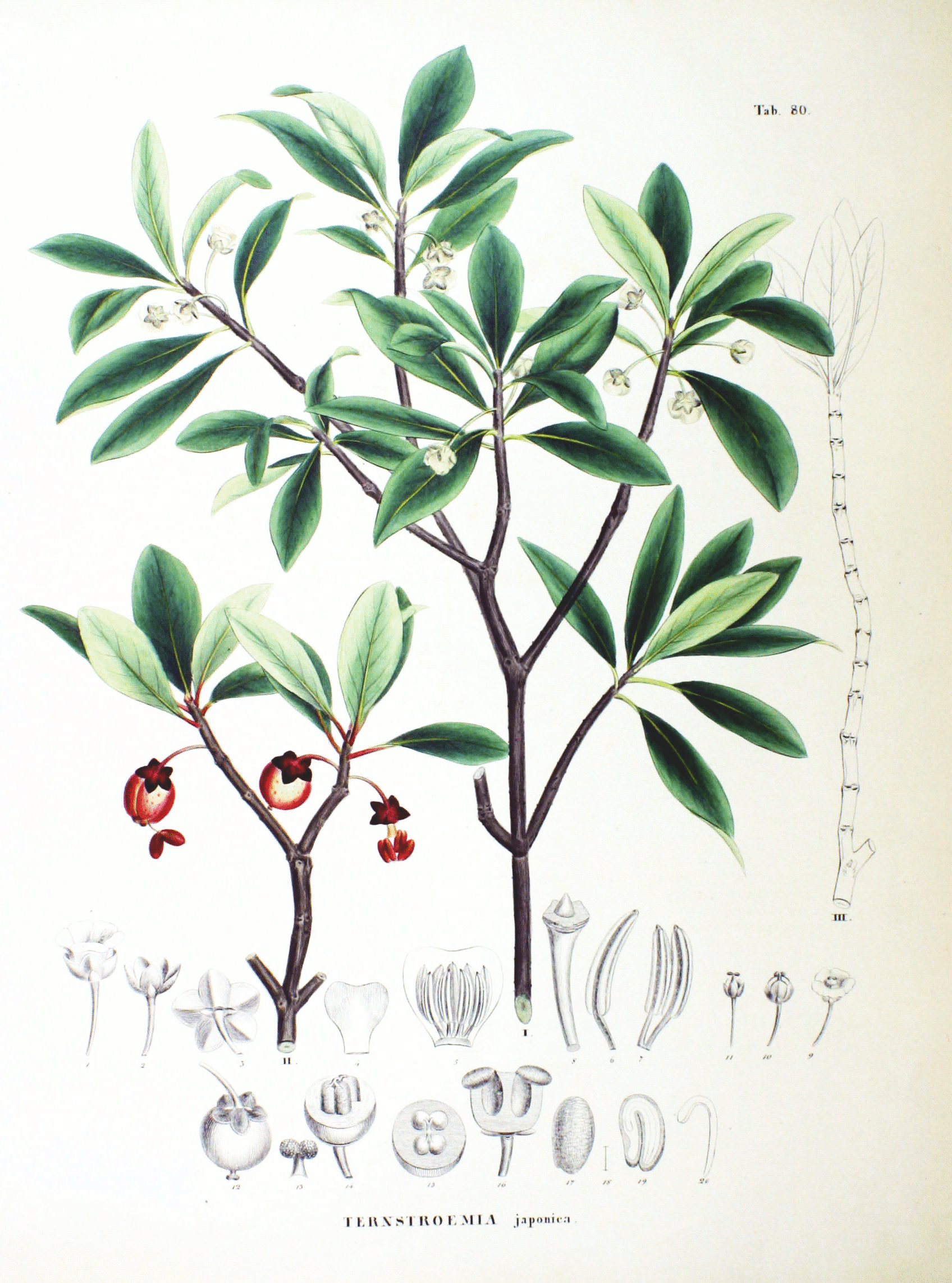

Scientific classification
- Kingdom: Plantae
- Clade: Tracheophytes
- Clade: Angiosperms
- Clade: Eudicots
- Clade: Asterids
- Order: Ericales
- Family: Pentaphylacaceae
- Genus: Ternstroemia
- Species: T. gymnanthera

Binomial name
- Ternstroemia gymnanthera (Wight & Arn.) Sprague

Synonyms
- Ternstroemia japonica (Thunb.)

= Ternstroemia gymnanthera =

Species of flowering plant

Ternstroemia gymnanthera is a species of flowering plant in the family Pentaphylacaceae which grows on elevations of 200–2,800 metres (660–9,190 ft) in Japan, China and on elevation of 1,200–1,500 metres (3,900–4,900 ft) in Himalayas. The plant is 3.5 metres (11 ft) tall and blooms from June to July.
