= Ilex tolucana =

Conservation status
- Vulnerable (IUCN 2.3)

Scientific classification
- Kingdom: Plantae
- Clade: Tracheophytes
- Clade: Angiosperms
- Clade: Eudicots
- Clade: Asterids
- Order: Aquifoliales
- Family: Aquifoliaceae
- Genus: Ilex
- Species: I. tolucana

Binomial name
- Ilex tolucana Hemsley

Synonyms
- Ilex discolor var. tolucana (Hemsl.) Edwin ex T.R. Dudley. 1997; Ilex discolor var. tolucana (Hemsl.) Edwin ex J. Linares 2005

Species of plant

Ilex tolucana is a tree species in the family Aquifoliaceae, native to the mountains of Mexico and Central America from east-central Sonora south to El Salvador.

== Habitat and ecology ==
Ilex tolucana is a tree up to 15 m tall, found in oak forest or in mesophyllous mountain forest, frequently along stream banks. It is almost entirely glabrous with leaves entire or with a few small teeth toward the tip. Flowers are white, born in small umbels. Berries are small, red and globose.

These plants are being conserved at the El Triunfo Biosphere Reserve.
