= Salix paradoxa =

Scientific classification
- Kingdom: Plantae
- Clade: Embryophytes
- Clade: Tracheophytes
- Clade: Spermatophytes
- Clade: Angiosperms
- Clade: Eudicots
- Clade: Rosids
- Order: Malpighiales
- Family: Salicaceae
- Genus: Salix
- Species: S. paradoxa

Binomial name
- Salix paradoxa Kunth

Species of flowering plant

Salix paradoxa, is a species of willow native to south central Mexico.
