= Christian Julius Wilhelm Schiede =

German botanist (1798–1836)

Christian Julius Wilhelm Schiede (February 3, 1798 – December 1836) was a German medical doctor and botanist born in Kassel.

He studied natural sciences and medicine in Berlin and Göttingen, where he earned his doctorate in 1825. Afterwards he practiced medicine in Kassel.

In 1828 Schiede emigrated to Mexico, accompanied by Ferdinand Deppe (1794-1861), a German naturalist with previous experience in the country. The two scientists planned to collect zoological and botanical specimens, which would then be sold to museums and dealers in Europe. In July 1828 they settled in Jalapa, and performed scientific excursions throughout the state of Veracruz. Although they were able sell their collections to museums in Berlin and Vienna, the money earned was insufficient to continue operations, causing Deppe and Schiede to abandon their enterprise in late 1830. Christian Schiede died in Mexico in 1836 at the age of 38.

The botanical genera Schiedeella and Schiedea are named after him, as is a species of lizard, Anolis schiedei.

== Publications ==
- Über Bastarde im Pflanzenreich, 1824 – Hybrids in the plant kingdom.
- Schiede, C. J. W. De plantis hybridis sponte natis (1825) on BioLib
- Befruchtung der pflanzen, 1825 – Fertilization of plants.
- De plantis Mexicanis a G. Schiede (1830-1844); with Diederich Franz Leonhard von Schlechtendal, Ferdinand Deppe and Adelbert von Chamisso.
- Bibliography on World.Cat
