= Elisabeth Rohde =

German classical archaeologist

Elisabeth Rohde (23 October 1915 in Dresden – 2 July 2013 in Berlin) was a German classical archaeologist.

Elisabeth Rohde studied classical archaeology, ancient history and art history at Berlin University, where she graduated in 1945, with a dissertation entitled Theseusdarstellungen in der griechischen Vasenmalerei von den Anfängen bis zum vierten Jahrhundert (Depictions of Theseus in Greek vase painting from the Beginning until the Fourth Century).

From the beginning of her academic career, her work was connected with the Antikensammlung Berlin. Rohde initially worked with Carl Blümel and after 1945 worked as a labourer packing up the artworks of the Pergamonmuseum for transport to the Soviet Union. In 1955 she rearranged the Hellenistic architecture gallery, filling the gap left by statuary taken to Moscow by laying out the Hephaistion mosaic in their place. Two years later, she took part in the re-erection of the Pergamon altar after the Soviet Union returned most of the museum's art to the DDR. With Blümel, she rearranged the presentation of the altar in line with the latest scholarly consensus.

After Blümel went into retirement in 1961, Rohde became the acting Director of the collection. She was inconvenienced by the construction of the Berlin Wall, since she lived in Berlin-Charlottenburg in the west part of the city. Since she knew that a similar career was not open to her in West Germany at that time, she remained at the Antikensammlung and commuted daily between West and East Berlin. In 1971, Rohde was finally appointed full Director. She never allowed herself to be controlled by the DDR politically; her research remained free of DDR-speak and she was even able to close the Antikensammlung to their indoctrination. Furthermore, she maintained contact with her colleagues in the western part of the city. At her retirement in 1982 she received a special permanent visa for the DDR. Her successor was Max Kunze.

Rohde focused on the Pergamon altar, its historical and art historical significance, worked on the friezes and the Greek vases of the Berlin Antikensammlung and the Schlossmuseum Gotha. She edited three volumes of Corpus Vasorum Antiquorum. She was an ordinary member of the Deutsches Archäologisches Institut.

== Selected works ==
- Pergamon. Burgberg und Altar. (Pergamon: Citadel and Altar). Henschel, Berlin 1961
- Griechische und römische Kunst in den Staatlichen Museum zu Berlin. (Greek and Roman Art in the Staatlich Museum of Berlin) Henschel, Berlin 1968
- Der Altar von Pergamon. (The Altar of Pergamon). Akademie Verlag, Berlin 1973

== Bibliography ==
- Johannes Irmscher. Die Direktoren der Antikensammlung der Staatlichen Museen zu Berlin. In: Forschungen und Berichte 27 (1989), pp. 267–270, at p. 269.
- Nikolaus Bernau. "Nachruf Elisabeth Rohde: Die Direktorin pendelte täglich in den Osten." (Obituary) Berliner Zeitung, 7 July 2013.
