= Ternstroemia subsessilis =

Conservation status
- Critically Endangered (IUCN 2.3)

Scientific classification
- Kingdom: Plantae
- Clade: Tracheophytes
- Clade: Angiosperms
- Clade: Eudicots
- Clade: Asterids
- Order: Ericales
- Family: Pentaphylacaceae
- Genus: Ternstroemia
- Species: T. subsessilis

Binomial name
- Ternstroemia subsessilis (Britt.) Kobuski

Species of plant

Ternstroemia subsessilis, the el yunque colorado, is a species of plant in the Pentaphylacaceae family. It is endemic to Puerto Rico. It is threatened by habitat loss.
