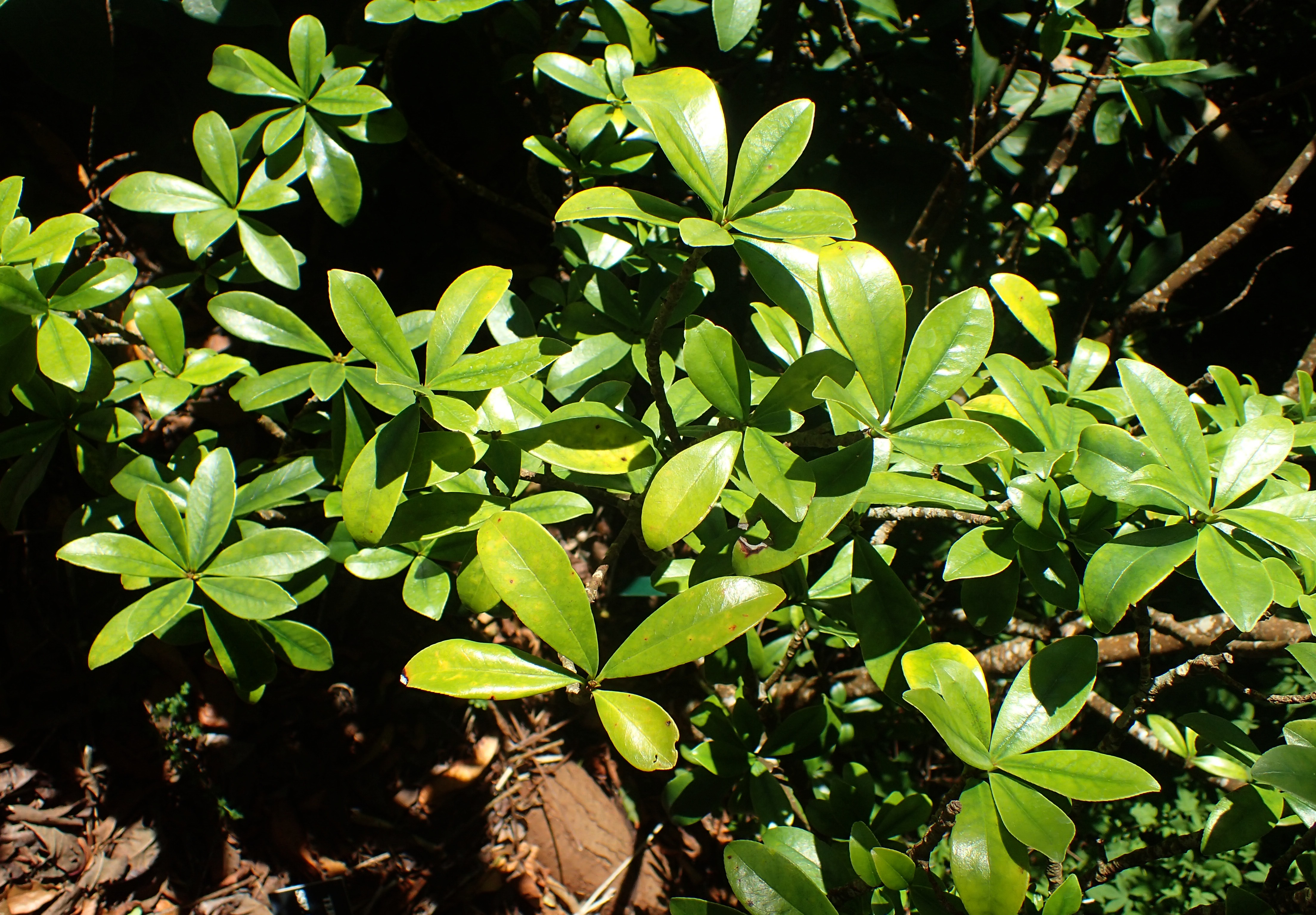

Scientific classification
- Kingdom: Plantae
- Clade: Tracheophytes
- Clade: Angiosperms
- Clade: Eudicots
- Clade: Asterids
- Order: Ericales
- Family: Pentaphylacaceae
- Genus: Ternstroemia
- Species: T. lineata

Binomial name
- Ternstroemia lineata DC.

Synonyms
- Taonabo lineata (DC.) Rose; Taonabo pringlei Rose; Ternstroemia cuneifolia Sessé & Moc.; Ternstroemia pringlei (Rose) Standl.

= Ternstroemia lineata =

Species of flowering plant

Ternstroemia lineata is a plant species native to high elevations in central Mexico. Many publications call this T. pringlei, but more recent publications confirm that the correct name is T. lineata.
