= Christopher Tärnström =

Swedish botanist (1711–1746)

Christopher Tärnström or Christoffer Tärnström (20 May 1711 – 4 December 1746) was a Swedish naturalist and Lutheran pastor who was the first of the students or apostles of Carl Linnaeus who travelled to Southeast Asia where he died off Vietnam. The plant genus Ternstroemia was named in honor of him by Carl Linnaeus the Younger in 1782.

Tärnström was born in Funbo in Uppsala to farmer Andreas and Margarethe Bille. He studied theology at Uppsala University and became interested in natural history, accompanying Carl von Linné (1707-1778) on field trips. In 1739, he wrote a thesis on the history of the Åland Islands and became ordained as a pastor. He taught at Östhammar in the fall of 1739 and at Vaxholm from 1741 to 1743. He also received a degree in philosophy in 1745. Encouraged by Linné and with the prospects of travel and natural history collection, he joined the Swedish East India Company as a chaplain. In 1746, he boarded the Calmar to Canton. He collected botanical specimens along the route. The ship was held up by the monsoon and Tärnström fell ill and died on the island of Pulo Condore (Con-Dao). Linnaeus had asked him to obtain a tea tree and a goldfish among other things. He sent no collections and following his death, his diary was returned to Sweden and published in 1746. Linnaeus described the domestic fowl as Phasianus gallus and gave the location as Pouli candor, based on the notes of Tärnström.

Tärnström married Sara Christina Schick in 1739, but she died in 1741. In 1742, he married Brigitta Stenhof. Two children and his widow survived him. The reaction of his widow made Linnaeus subsequently choose only unmarried apostles.
