= Ferdinand Deppe =

German naturalist, explorer and painter

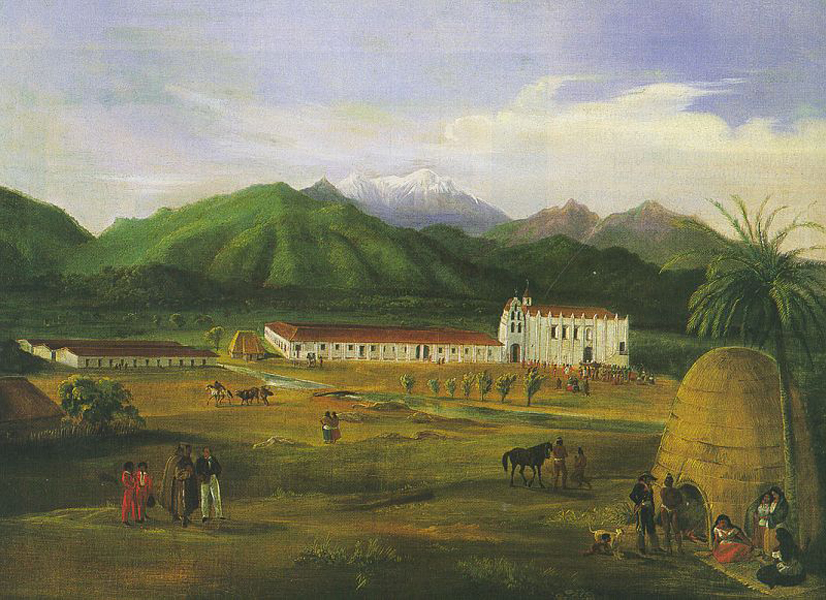
San Gabriel Mission, painted in 1832 by Ferdinand Deppe

Paul Ferdinand Deppe known mostly as Ferdinand Deppe (20 October 1795 – 3 February 1861) was a German naturalist, explorer and painter. He was the younger brother of Wilhelm Deppe, an accountant with the Berlin Zoological Museum. A number of species have been described from his collected and named after him.

== Life and work ==
Deppe was born in Berlin. He worked at the Royal Gardens but was connected to the Zoological Museum in Berlin where his brother Wilhelm was accountant. He was selected to accompany Count von Sack to Mexico in 1824. He studied English, Spanish and trained in the preparation of natural history specimens before leaving. He left Berlin in August 1824 and after changes of ships at London and Jamaica, reached Alvarado, Veracruz in December. He collected specimens of invertebrates as well as vertebrates. These specimens were purchased by Hinrich Lichtenstein and he then decided to make another trip to Mexico with botanist Wilhelm Schiede (1798–1836) with the plan to make a living by selling natural history specimens. In 1827 he travelled around Oaxaca and collected with William Bullock jr, the son of William Bullock. In 1828 he set up a base in Xalapa and began to collect in the region. Some of the specimens were bought by museums in Berlin and Vienna. From 1830 Schiede practiced medicine in Mexico City while Deppe began to try various other businesses to make living. He travelled widely, collecting even in California and Hawaii. He returned in 1838 to Berlin.

Some of his American flies were described by Christian Rudolph Wilhelm Wiedemann in Aussereuropäische Zweiflügelige Insekten published in Hamm (1828–1830). In the field of herpetology, he is commemorated in the specific epithets of Abronia deppii (Deppe's arboreal alligator lizard), Aspidoscelis deppii (blackbelly racerunner), Pituophis deppei (Mexican pine snake), and Tantilla deppei (Deppe's centipede snake). His name is also associated with Herichthys deppii (Nautla cichlid), Deppe's squirrel (Sciurus deppei) and Oxalis deppei, the so-called "lucky four-leaf clover".

In 1830 a printed pricelist was distributed listing specimens for sale with the title: Preis-Verzeichniss der Saugethiere, Vogel, Amphibien, Fische und Krebse, welche von den Herren Deppe und Schiede in Mexico gesammelt worden, und bei dem unterzeichneten Bevollmächtigten in Berlin gegen baare Zahlung in Preuss. Courant zu erhalten sind. The items had been collected by Ferdinand Deppe in Mexico and the binomial names would have been supplied by Hinrich Lichtenstein who was the director of the Zoological Museum. This list was signed by Wilhelm Deppe and is now considered as the original publication for 11 bird species. Although Ferdinand Deppe collected the specimens, under the rules of the International Code of Zoological Nomenclature, Wilhelm Deppe is considered as the authority.

== Associated publications ==
- "Travels in California in 1837"; (1953) Part of the series: Early California travels series, 15. Translated from a publication of 1847, Zeitschrift für Erdkunde, vol. 7, p. 383–90.
