= Max Kunze =

German classical archaeologist and Winckelmann scholar

- Born: October 26, 1944 (age 82); Schotten, Germany
- Education: Humboldt University of Berlin
- Occupations: Classical archaeologist, professor
- Known for: Scholarship on Johann Joachim Winckelmann; Director of Antikensammlung Berlin; President of the Winckelmann Society
- Notable work: Die Welt der Etrusker; Der Altar von Pergamon; Meisterwerke antiker Bronzen
- Title: Honorary Professor, University of Mannheim

Max Kunze (born 26 October 1944 in Schotten) is a German classical archaeologist.

== Life ==
Max Kunze studied Classical archaeology and classical philology at the Humboldt University of Berlin (HU), between 1964 and 1969. After this he was employed until 1971 as an academic member of the Münzkabinett Berlin. In 1974 he gained a doctorate from Humboldt University for his thesis on classicising Roman relief sculpture. From 1969 until 1982 he was director of the Winckelmann Museum in Stendal and secretary of the Winckelmann Society, from 1978 to 1990 he was managing director of the society. From 1982 to 1993 he was Director of the East Berlin Antikensammlung of the Berlin City Museums. He wrote several guides and introductions for the collections at the Pergamonmuseum. From 1990 he has been President of the Winckelmann Society. In 1992 he was adjunct professor at the Institute of Fine Arts at New York University and in 1993/4 he had a research project at the Metropolitan Museum of Art in New York. He was a lecturer at Akdeniz University (Antalya, Turkey). In 1996 he was habilitated by the University of Mannheim, where he has been an Honorary professor since 2001. He is head of the project for the historical and critical publication of Winckelmann's writings at the Akademie der Wissenschaften und der Literatur in Mainz. Since 1990 he has been the editor of the Schriften der Winckelmann-Gesellschaft (Writings of the Winckelmann Society), as well as founder and editor of Akzidenzen. Flugblätter der Winckelmann-Gesellschaft (Newsletter of the Winckelmann Society) and Stendaler Winckelmann-Forschungen (Winckelmann Research in Stendal). For the Winckelmann Society he has been editor of numerous exhibition catalogues and co-editor of Geschichte der Kunst des Altertums (history of Antique Art), as well as J. J. Winckelmann. Schriften und Nachlaß (J. J. Winckelmann. Writings and Legacy). In October 2009 an international colloquium was held at Berlin to celebrate his 65th birthday.

In 2012 he was involved in a dispute as to the authenticity of a bust of Alexander the Great. The dispute was triggered by the question of the authenticity of a bronze Alexander bust that was shown in the Stendaler Winckelmann Museum in 2000. For Kunze the exhibit was a 2000 year old work of art although Stefan Lehmann argued that it is a fake, at most 100 years old.

== Selected works ==
- Die historischen und ideologischen Grundlagen des Klassizismus-Phänomens in der Reliefkunst der frühen römischen Kaiserzeit. (The Historical and Ideological Foundations of the Classicising Phenomenon in Relief Sculpture of the Early Roman Empire) Berlin 1974 (Dissertation).
- Max Kunze, Huberta Heres (ed.): Die Welt der Etrusker. (The World of the Etruscans) Akademie Verlag, Berlin 1990, ISBN 3-05-001013-4.
- Der Altar von Pergamon. (The Altar of Pergamon) Staatliche Museen Berlin, Berlin 1991, ISBN 3-88609-263-1.
- Meisterwerke antiker Bronzen und Metallarbeiten aus der Sammlung Borowski. (Masterpieces of Ancient Bronze and Metalwork in the Borowski Collection) Verlag Franz Philipp Rutzen, Ruhpolding und Mainz 2007, ISBN 978-3-938646-06-9.
