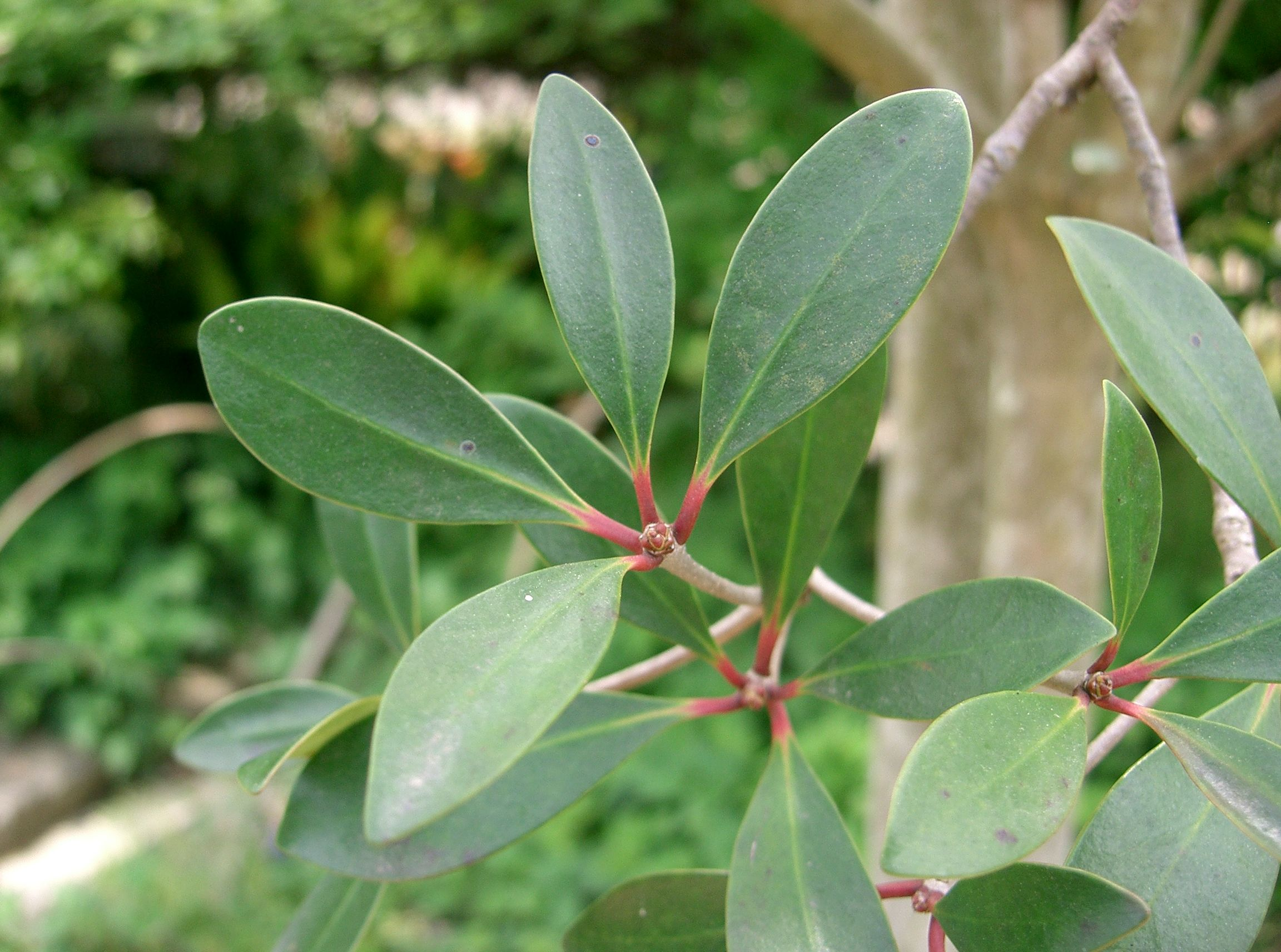
- Leaves of Ternstroemia gymnanthera.

Scientific classification
- Kingdom: Plantae
- Clade: Embryophytes
- Clade: Tracheophytes
- Clade: Spermatophytes
- Clade: Angiosperms
- Clade: Eudicots
- Clade: Asterids
- Order: Ericales
- Family: Pentaphylacaceae
- Tribe: Ternstroemieae
- Genus: Ternstroemia; Mutis ex L.f.

Type species
- Ternstroemia meridionalis Mutis ex L.f.

Species
- 161 - see List of Ternstroemia species

Synonyms
- 13 synonyms: Adinandrella Exell; Amphania Banks ex DC.; Cyclandra Lauterb.; Dupinia Scop.; Erythrochiton Griff.; Hoferia Scop.; Llanosia Blanco; Michoxia Vell.; Mokof Adans.; Mokofua Kuntze; Reinwardtia Korth.; Taonabo Aubl.; Voelckeria Klotzsch & H.Karst. ex Endl.

= Ternstroemia =

Genus of flowering plants

Ternstroemia is a large genus of flowering plants in the family Pentaphylacaceae, distributed throughout tropical and subtropical regions in Africa, Asia, and the Americas. The genus, first described by Carl Linnaeus the Younger in 1782, consists of 161 species of shrubs and trees generally known as ternstroemias. Members of the genus are often grown as ornamental plants or are used medicinally.

== Description ==
Members of Ternstroemia grow as evergreen shrubs or trees with alternate leaves, whose margins are entire or uncommonly serrate. The flowers are axillary and usually solitary, but may appear in clusters on leafless branches. Species of the genus are androdioecious, where bisexual and male flowers appear on separate individuals. The fruits are fleshy, berry-like capsules that either remain closed or dehisce, revealing the dangling seeds within; the seeds are kidney‑shaped, slightly compressed, and covered by a fleshy red coating over a thick endosperm.

== Taxonomy ==
Ternstroemia was first described by Carl Linnaeus the Younger in 1782, having been proposed by José Celestino Mutis earlier. The genus, along with related genera such as Eurya and Cleyera, were previously classified within a subfamily of Theaceae; in a subsequent revision, the genus, together with its relatives, were transferred to the now defunct Ternstroemiaceae family. In 2016, the APG IV system placed the group in the formerly monotypic Pentaphylacaceae.

The genus name is in honor of Christopher Tärnström, a clergyman, botanist, and student of Linnaeus.

=== Selected species ===
- Ternstroemia brasiliensis Cambess.
- Ternstroemia carnosa Cambess.
- Ternstroemia cherryi (F.M.Bailey) Merr. ex J.F.Bailey & C.T White
- Ternstroemia dentata (Aubl.) Sw.
- Ternstroemia elliptica Sw.
- Ternstroemia guineensis Cheek
- Ternstroemia gymnanthera (Wight & Arn.) Bedd.
- Ternstroemia heptasepala Krug & Urb.
- Ternstroemia kwangtungensis Merr.
- Ternstroemia lineata DC.
- Ternstroemia luquillensis Krug & Urb.
- Ternstroemia luteoflora L.K.Ling
- Ternstroemia meridionalis Mutis ex L.f.
- Ternstroemia microphylla Merr.
- Ternstroemia peduncularis DC.
- Ternstroemia robinsonii Merr.
- Ternstroemia stahlii Krug & Urb.
- Ternstroemia subsessilis (Britton) Kobuski
- Ternstroemia sylvatica Schltdl. & Cham.
- Ternstroemia tepezapote Schltdl. & Cham.
