= Freziera smithiana =

Conservation status
- Least Concern (IUCN 3.1)

Scientific classification
- Kingdom: Plantae
- Clade: Tracheophytes
- Clade: Angiosperms
- Clade: Eudicots
- Clade: Asterids
- Order: Ericales
- Family: Pentaphylacaceae
- Genus: Freziera
- Species: F. smithiana

Binomial name
- Freziera smithiana Kobuski

Species of flowering plant

Freziera smithiana is a species of flowering plant in the Pentaphylacaceae family. It is endemic to Colombia.
