= Freziera spathulifolia =

Conservation status
- Critically Endangered (IUCN 3.1)

Scientific classification
- Kingdom: Plantae
- Clade: Tracheophytes
- Clade: Angiosperms
- Clade: Eudicots
- Clade: Asterids
- Order: Ericales
- Family: Pentaphylacaceae
- Genus: Freziera
- Species: F. spathulifolia

Binomial name
- Freziera spathulifolia (Melch.) Kobuski

Synonyms
- Eurya spathulifolia Melch.

Species of plant

Freziera spathulifolia is a species of flowering plant in the Pentaphylacaceae family. It is endemic to Peru.
