= F. ferruginea =

F. ferruginea may refer to:

- Fimbristylis ferruginea, the rusty sedge, a plant species
- Freziera ferruginea, a plant species endemic to Peru

== Synonyms ==
Fagus ferruginea (disambiguation) may refer to one of the beech tree species:

- Fagus ferruginea Dryand., a synonym for Fagus grandifolia subsp. grandifolia (American Beech)
- Fagus ferruginea var. caroliniana Loudon, also a synonym for Fagus grandifolia subsp. grandifolia
- Fagus ferruginea Siebold (Invalid), a synonym for Fagus crenata Blume (Japanese beech)

== See also ==
- Ferruginea (disambiguation)
