= Freziera caloneura =

Conservation status
- Vulnerable (IUCN 2.3)

Scientific classification
- Kingdom: Plantae
- Clade: Tracheophytes
- Clade: Angiosperms
- Clade: Eudicots
- Clade: Asterids
- Order: Ericales
- Family: Pentaphylacaceae
- Genus: Freziera
- Species: F. caloneura

Binomial name
- Freziera caloneura Kobuski

Species of flowering plant

Freziera caloneura is a species of plant in the Pentaphylacaceae family. It is found in Bolivia and Peru.
