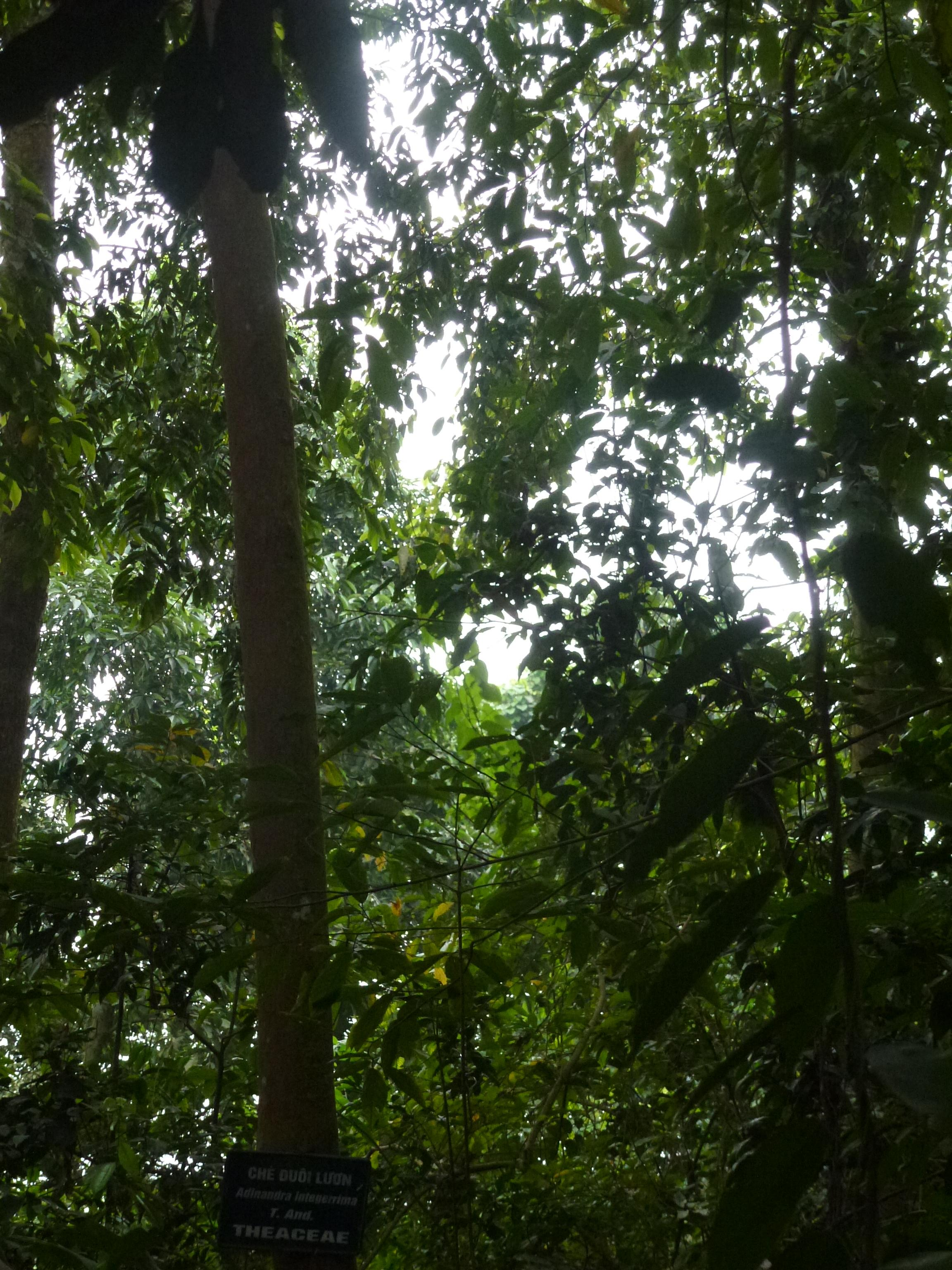

Conservation status
- Least Concern (IUCN 3.1)

Scientific classification
- Kingdom: Plantae
- Clade: Tracheophytes
- Clade: Angiosperms
- Clade: Eudicots
- Clade: Asterids
- Order: Ericales
- Family: Pentaphylacaceae
- Genus: Adinandra
- Species: A. integerrima

Binomial name
- Adinandra integerrima T.Anderson ex Dyer

Synonyms
- Adinandra dasyantha Choisy; Adinandra dumosa S.Vidal; Adinandra hullettii King; Adinandra integerrima var. nigropunctata Pierre; Adinandra integerrima var. phlebophylla (Hance) Pierre; Adinandra lutescens Craib; Adinandra phlebophylla Hance; Ternstroemia integerrima Wall., not validly publ.; Ternstroemia reticulata Wall., not validly publ.; Gordonia reticulata Wall., not validly publ.

= Adinandra integerrima =

Species of flowering plant

Adinandra integerrima is a species of flowering plant in the Pentaphylacaceae family. It is a tree native to mainland Indochina (Cambodia, Laos, Myanmar, Thailand, and Vietnam), Peninsular Malaysia, Singapore, and southern and southeastern Yunnan Province in south-central China. It grows in lowland and montane tropical moist forest from sea level up to 1,900 metres elevation. It is threatened by habitat loss.
