= Balthasaria schliebenii =

Conservation status
- Near Threatened (IUCN 3.1)

Scientific classification
- Kingdom: Plantae
- Clade: Tracheophytes
- Clade: Angiosperms
- Clade: Eudicots
- Clade: Asterids
- Order: Ericales
- Family: Pentaphylacaceae
- Genus: Balthasaria
- Species: B. schliebenii

Binomial name
- Balthasaria schliebenii (Melch.) Verdc.

Species of plant

Balthasaria schliebenii is a species of plant in the Pentaphylacaceae family. It is found in the Democratic Republic of the Congo, Rwanda, and Tanzania.
