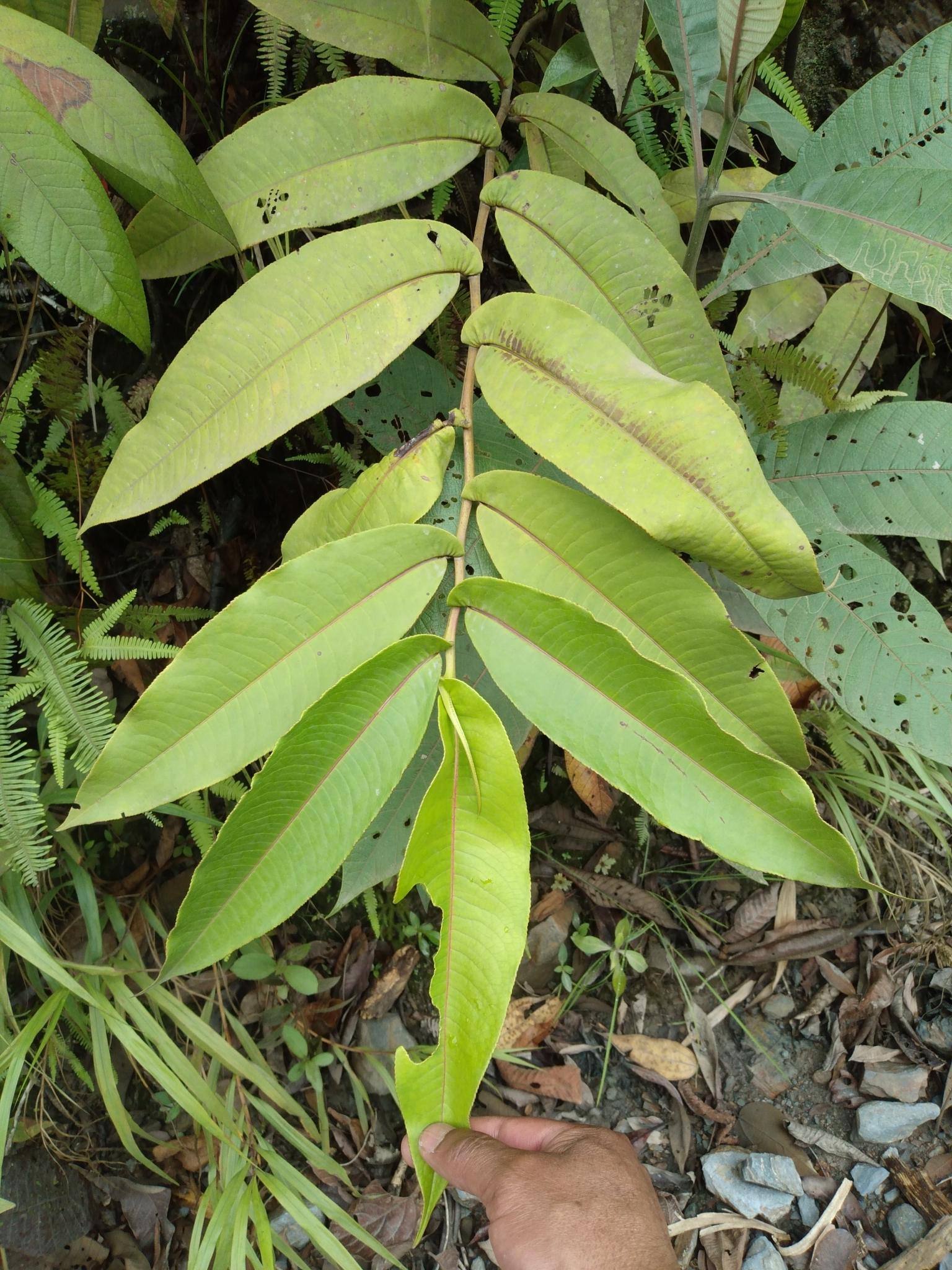

Conservation status
- Endangered (IUCN 3.1)

Scientific classification
- Kingdom: Plantae
- Clade: Tracheophytes
- Clade: Angiosperms
- Clade: Eudicots
- Clade: Asterids
- Order: Ericales
- Family: Pentaphylacaceae
- Genus: Freziera
- Species: F. angulosa

Binomial name
- Freziera angulosa Tul.

Synonyms
- Eurya angulosa (Tul.) Szyszył.

= Freziera angulosa =

Species of flowering plant

Freziera angulosa is a species of flowering plant in the family Pentaphylacaceae. It is a tree endemic to Bolivia.
