= Adinandra corneriana =

Conservation status
- Vulnerable (IUCN 2.3)

Scientific classification
- Kingdom: Plantae
- Clade: Tracheophytes
- Clade: Angiosperms
- Clade: Eudicots
- Clade: Asterids
- Order: Ericales
- Family: Pentaphylacaceae
- Genus: Adinandra
- Species: A. corneriana

Binomial name
- Adinandra corneriana Kobuski

Species of tree

Adinandra corneriana is a species of plant in the Pentaphylacaceae family. It is a tree endemic to Peninsular Malaysia. It is threatened by habitat loss.
