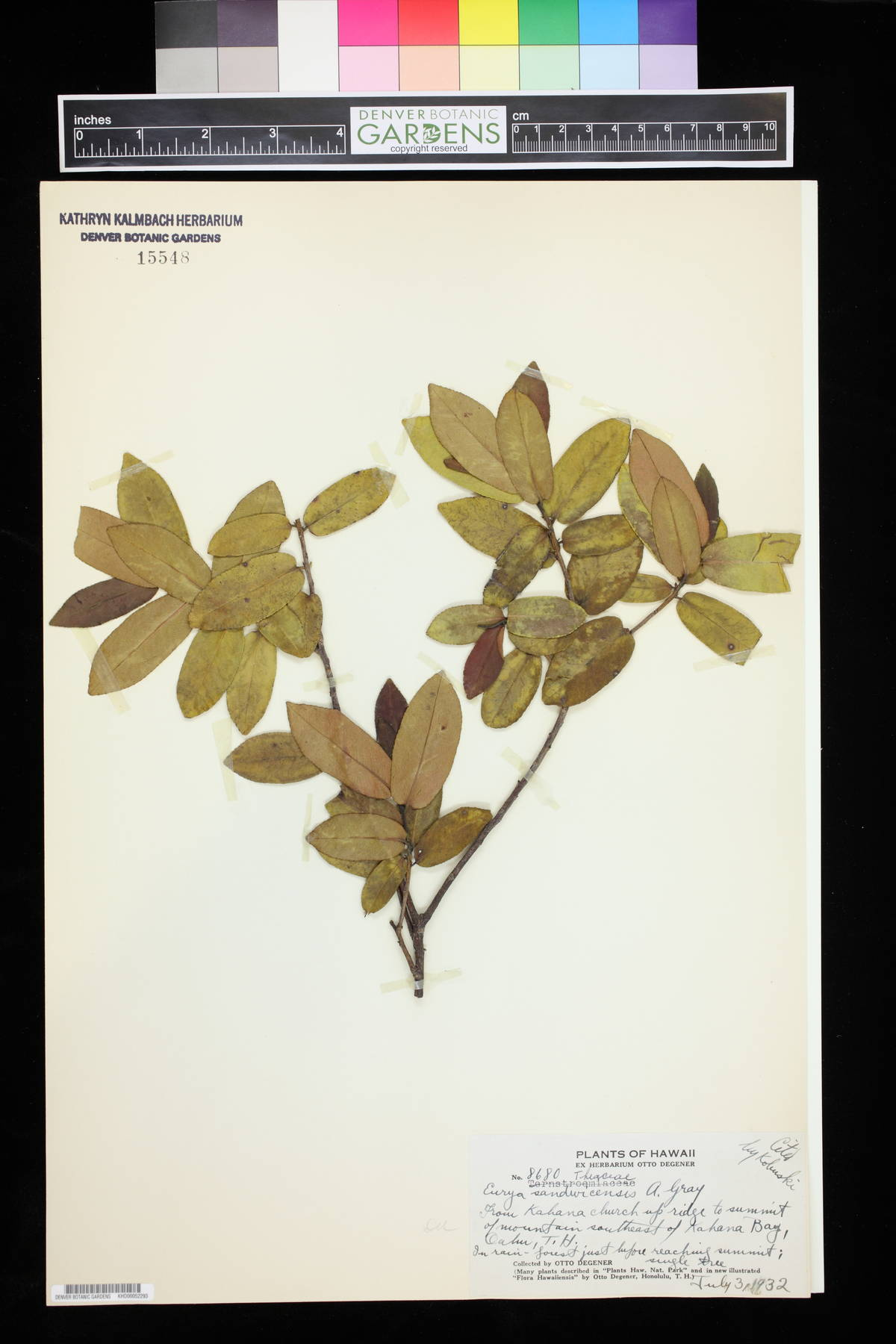

Conservation status
- Vulnerable (IUCN 2.3)

- Imperiled (NatureServe)

Scientific classification
- Kingdom: Plantae
- Clade: Tracheophytes
- Clade: Angiosperms
- Clade: Eudicots
- Clade: Asterids
- Order: Ericales
- Family: Pentaphylacaceae
- Genus: Eurya
- Species: E. sandwicensis

Binomial name
- Eurya sandwicensis A.Gray

= Eurya sandwicensis =

Ānini

Species of tree

Eurya sandwicensis, the ānini or wānini, is a species of flowering plant in the family Pentaphylacaceae, that is endemic to Hawaiʻi. It is threatened by habitat loss.

It is a perennial shrub that is green and has leaves throughout the winter. It can get up to 20 feet tall. The fruit is a dark blueish black berry. The flowers color can be white, yellow, purple, and brown.
