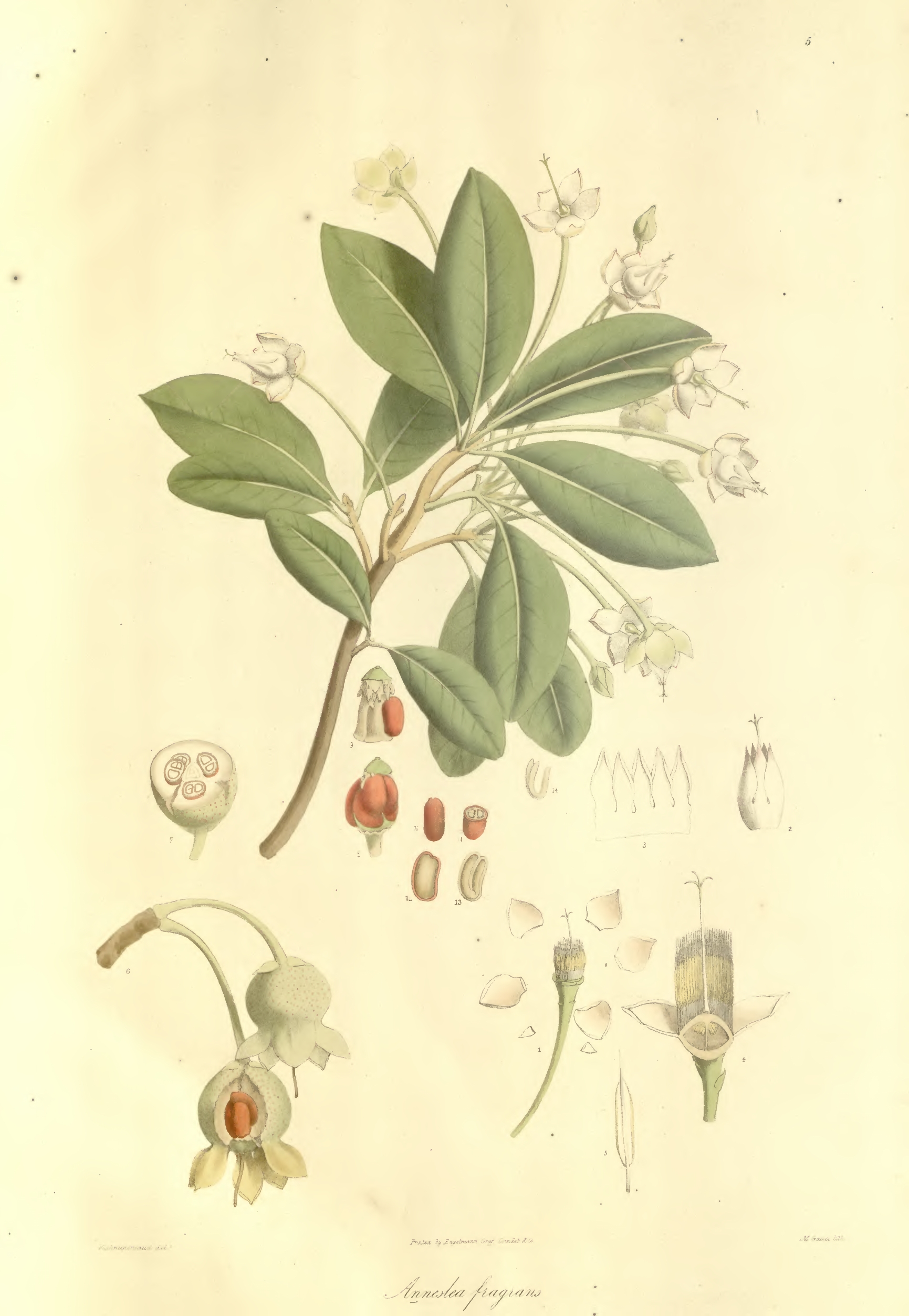

Scientific classification
- Kingdom: Plantae
- Clade: Tracheophytes
- Clade: Angiosperms
- Clade: Eudicots
- Clade: Asterids
- Order: Ericales
- Family: Pentaphylacaceae
- Genus: Anneslea
- Species: A. fragrans

Binomial name
- Anneslea fragrans Wall.

= Anneslea fragrans =

Species of flowering plant

Anneslea fragrans is a species of shrubs or trees, 3–15 meters tall. It is native to Cambodia, Laos, Malaysia, Myanmar, Thailand and Vietnam, growing in forests or thickets on mountain slopes or in valleys.

Bark dark brown. Young branches grayish brown; current year branchlets reddish brown. Leaf blade ovate, elliptic, obovate-elliptic, oblong, or oblong-lanceolate; leathery to thinly leathery, pale green or glaucescent green and reddish brown glandular punctate.

Axillary flowers are pale yellow. There are up to more than 10 in a corymb. The fruit is ellipsoid 2–3.5 cm in diameter and contains long obovate seeds, with a fleshy red outer layer. Flowering occurs from October to March, with fruit appearing from July to September.

Synonyms include Callosmia fragrans and Mountnorrisia Fragrans.

Several varieties have been recognized primarily based on leaf differences: A. fragrans var. alpina (H. L. Li) Kobuski; A. fragrans var. hainanensis Kobuski; A. fragrans var. lanceolata Hayata; A. fragrans var. rubriflora (Hu & Hung T. Chang) L. K. Ling.
