= Balthasaria mannii =

Conservation status
- Critically Endangered (IUCN 3.1)

Scientific classification
- Kingdom: Plantae
- Clade: Embryophytes
- Clade: Tracheophytes
- Clade: Spermatophytes
- Clade: Angiosperms
- Clade: Eudicots
- Clade: Asterids
- Order: Ericales
- Family: Pentaphylacaceae
- Genus: Balthasaria
- Species: B. mannii

Binomial name
- Balthasaria mannii (Oliv.) Verdc.

Synonyms
- Adinandra mannii Oliv.; Melchiora mannii (Oliv.) Kobuski

Species of flowering plant

Balthasaria mannii is a species of flowering plant in the Pentaphylacaceae family. It is a tree endemic to São Tomé Island.
