= Eurya rapensis =

Conservation status
- Least Concern (IUCN 2.3)

Scientific classification
- Kingdom: Plantae
- Clade: Tracheophytes
- Clade: Angiosperms
- Clade: Eudicots
- Clade: Asterids
- Order: Ericales
- Family: Pentaphylacaceae
- Genus: Eurya
- Species: E. rapensis

Binomial name
- Eurya rapensis F.Br. (1935)

Species of flowering plant

Eurya rapensis is a species of plant in the Pentaphylacaceae family. It is endemic to the island of Rapa Iti, in the Tubuai Islands of French Polynesia.

Plants of the World Online treats it as a synonym of Eurya nitida subsp. nitida.
