= Freziera dudleyi =

Conservation status
- Endangered (IUCN 2.3)

Scientific classification
- Kingdom: Plantae
- Clade: Tracheophytes
- Clade: Angiosperms
- Clade: Eudicots
- Clade: Asterids
- Order: Ericales
- Family: Pentaphylacaceae
- Genus: Freziera
- Species: F. dudleyi

Binomial name
- Freziera dudleyi A.H.Gentry

Species of plant

Freziera dudleyi is a species of plant in the Pentaphylacaceae family. It is found in Bolivia and Peru.
