= Eurya rengechiensis =

Conservation status
- Endangered (IUCN 2.3)

Scientific classification
- Kingdom: Plantae
- Clade: Tracheophytes
- Clade: Angiosperms
- Clade: Eudicots
- Clade: Asterids
- Order: Ericales
- Family: Pentaphylacaceae
- Genus: Eurya
- Species: E. rengechiensis

Binomial name
- Eurya rengechiensis Yamamoto

Species of plant

Eurya rengechiensis is a species of plant in the family Pentaphylacaceae. It is endemic to Taiwan and found only near Taichung. Eurya rengechiensis is an evergreen small tree.
