= Adinandra griffithii =

Conservation status
- Critically Endangered (IUCN 3.1)

Scientific classification
- Kingdom: Plantae
- Clade: Tracheophytes
- Clade: Angiosperms
- Clade: Eudicots
- Clade: Asterids
- Order: Ericales
- Family: Pentaphylacaceae
- Genus: Adinandra
- Species: A. griffithii

Binomial name
- Adinandra griffithii Dyer

Species of flowering plant

Adinandra griffithii is a species of plant in the Pentaphylacaceae family.

== Description ==
The tree species is endemic to Meghalaya state in northeast India.

Adinandra griffithii is a small tree confined to Cherrapunji and Shongpung forests.

It is a critically endangered species on the IUCN Red List, threatened by habitat loss. At Cherrapunji in the East Khasi Hills district a cement factory has caused the loss of habitat.
