= Freziera punctata =

Conservation status
- Vulnerable (IUCN 2.3)

Scientific classification
- Kingdom: Plantae
- Clade: Tracheophytes
- Clade: Angiosperms
- Clade: Eudicots
- Clade: Asterids
- Order: Ericales
- Family: Pentaphylacaceae
- Genus: Freziera
- Species: F. punctata

Binomial name
- Freziera punctata A.L.Weitzman

Species of flowering plant

Freziera punctata is a species of plant in the Pentaphylacaceae family. It is endemic to Colombia.
