= Adinandra angulata =

Conservation status
- Least Concern (IUCN 3.1)

Scientific classification
- Kingdom: Plantae
- Clade: Tracheophytes
- Clade: Angiosperms
- Clade: Eudicots
- Clade: Asterids
- Order: Ericales
- Family: Pentaphylacaceae
- Genus: Adinandra
- Species: A. angulata

Binomial name
- Adinandra angulata Ridl.

Species of tree

Adinandra angulata is a species of plant in the taxonomic family Pentaphylacaceae. A. angulata is a tree endemic to Peninsular Malaysia in Gunong Tahan, Pahang. The species Adinandra angulata is 12.19 to 15.24 meters in height. It grows in montane tropical rain forest (cloud forest) from 1,700 to 1,800 metres elevation.
