= Adinandra forbesii =

Conservation status
- Near Threatened (IUCN 3.1)

Scientific classification
- Kingdom: Plantae
- Clade: Tracheophytes
- Clade: Angiosperms
- Clade: Eudicots
- Clade: Asterids
- Order: Ericales
- Family: Pentaphylacaceae
- Genus: Adinandra
- Species: A. forbesii

Binomial name
- Adinandra forbesii Baker f.

Species of tree

Adinandra forbesii is a species of flowering plant in the Pentaphylacaceae family. It is a tree endemic to New Guinea island, within the nation of Papua New Guinea, and in the Western New Guinea region of Indonesia. It is an IUCN Red List near-threatened species, endangered by habitat loss.
