= Freziera alata =

Conservation status
- Vulnerable (IUCN 3.1)

Scientific classification
- Kingdom: Plantae
- Clade: Tracheophytes
- Clade: Angiosperms
- Clade: Eudicots
- Clade: Asterids
- Order: Ericales
- Family: Pentaphylacaceae
- Genus: Freziera
- Species: F. alata

Binomial name
- Freziera alata A.L.Weitzman ex D.Santam. & A.K.Monro

Species of flowering plant

Freziera alata is a species of flowering plant in the Pentaphylacaceae family. It is endemic to Bolivia.
