= Balthasaria =

Scientific classification
- Kingdom: Plantae
- Clade: Tracheophytes
- Clade: Angiosperms
- Clade: Eudicots
- Clade: Asterids
- Order: Ericales
- Family: Pentaphylacaceae
- Tribe: Freziereae
- Genus: Balthasaria; Verdc.

Synonyms
- Melchiora Kobuski

Genus of plants

Balthasaria is a genus of plant in the family Pentaphylacaceae. They are found in Africa, within Burundi, Rwanda, Tanzania, Uganda and Zaïre.

Originally the species was called Melchiora by Clarence Emmeren Kobuski in 1956 in honour of Hans Melchior (1894 - 1984) a German botanist, but this was deemed incorrect by IPNI, as Kobuski should have formed his name by adding 'ia' to Melchior, becoming an illegitimate homonym for the fungal genus Melchioria published by Penzig and Saccardo in 1897, in honor of Melchior Treub. Botanist Bernard Verdcourt noted "Since a new name is inevitable I have chosen one based on one of the other 'wise men", ie, Balthazar.

It contains the following species :

- Balthasaria mannii (Oliv.) Verdc.
- Balthasaria schliebenii (Melch.) Verdc.
