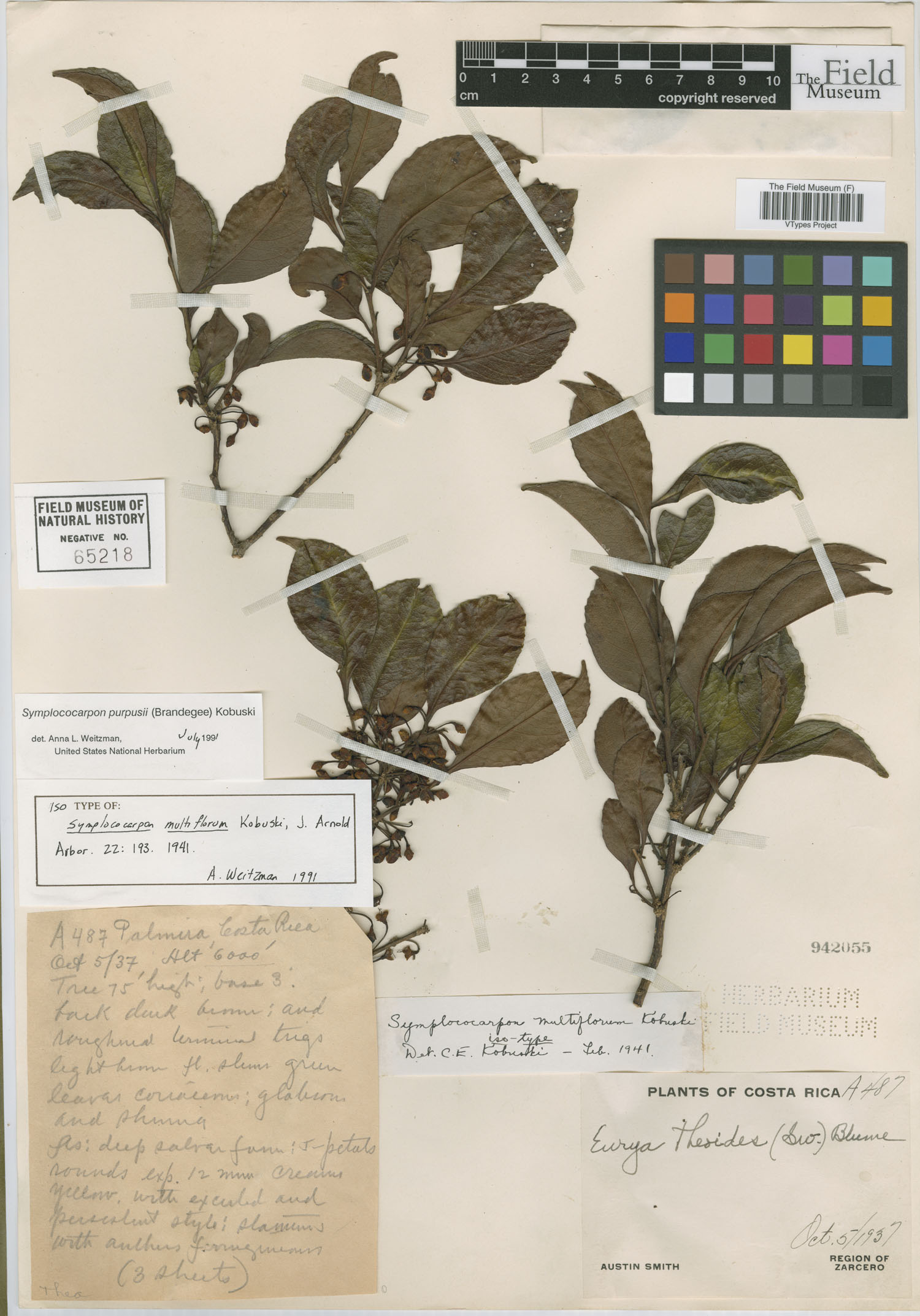

Scientific classification
- Kingdom: Plantae
- Clade: Embryophytes
- Clade: Tracheophytes
- Clade: Spermatophytes
- Clade: Angiosperms
- Clade: Eudicots
- Clade: Asterids
- Order: Ericales
- Family: Pentaphylacaceae
- Genus: Symplococarpon
- Species: S. purpusii

Binomial name
- Symplococarpon purpusii (Brandegee) Kobuski
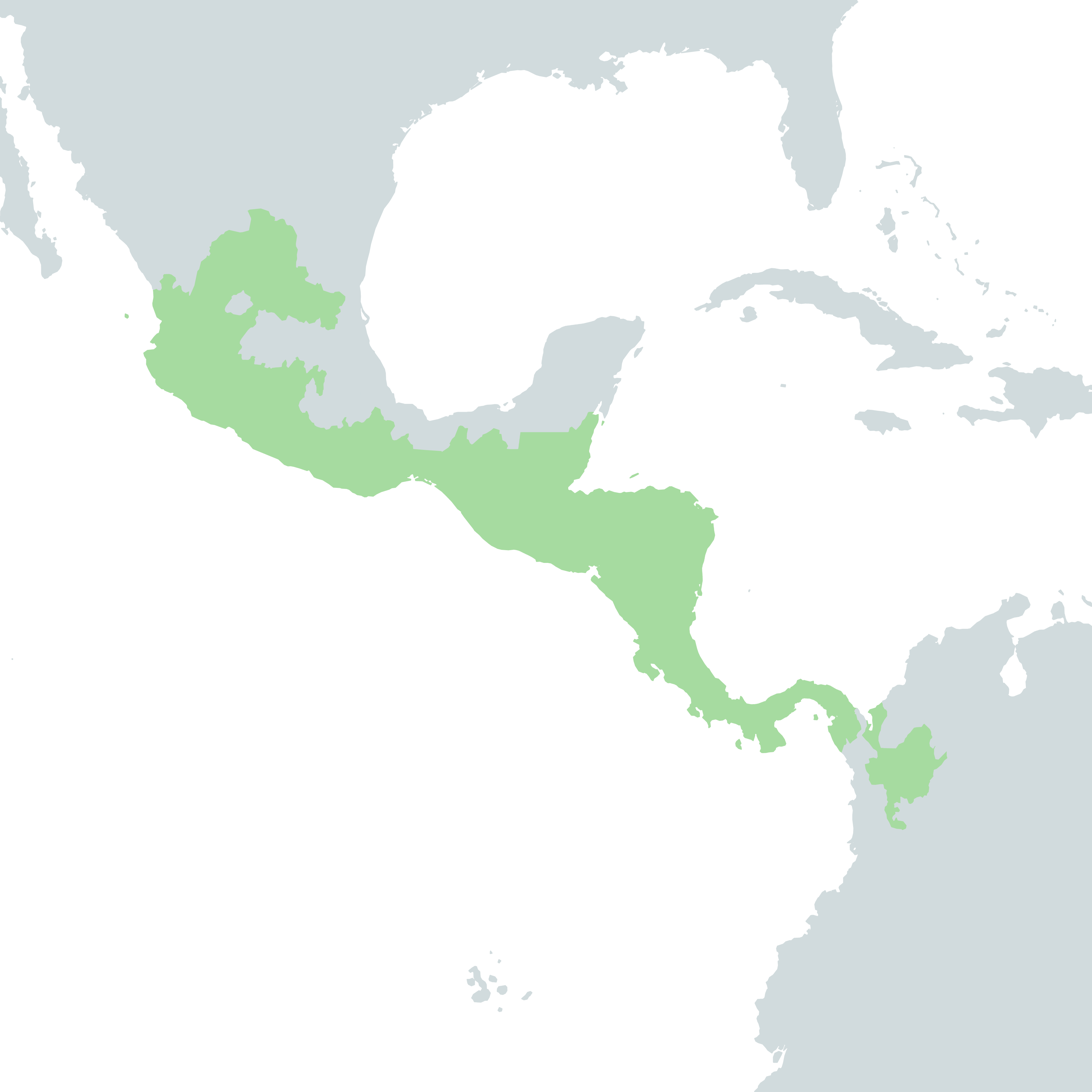
- Symplococarpon purpusii's territorial extent

= Symplococarpon purpusii =

Species of flowering plant

Symplococarpon purpusii is a flowering plant species of the genus Symplococarpon. It is native from southern Mexico to northern Colombia; occurring in such a large territory is hence presumed to have a large population and listed as Least Concern according to the IUCN Red List. It was first described in 1941 in the Journal of the Arnold Arboretum.

This species of plant can be found in elevations as low as 116 metres and as high as 3,017 metres. It can be found in the tropical biome. This plant is important to the diet of the resplendent quetzal and horned guan.
