= Freziera ciliata =

Conservation status
- Vulnerable (IUCN 2.3)

Scientific classification
- Kingdom: Plantae
- Clade: Tracheophytes
- Clade: Angiosperms
- Clade: Eudicots
- Clade: Asterids
- Order: Ericales
- Family: Pentaphylacaceae
- Genus: Freziera
- Species: F. ciliata

Binomial name
- Freziera ciliata A.L. Weitzman

Species of plant

Freziera ciliata is a species of plant in the Pentaphylacaceae family. It is endemic to Peru.
