= Freziera undulata =

Scientific classification
- Kingdom: Plantae
- Clade: Tracheophytes
- Clade: Angiosperms
- Clade: Eudicots
- Clade: Asterids
- Order: Ericales
- Family: Pentaphylacaceae
- Genus: Freziera
- Species: F. undulata

Binomial name
- Freziera undulata (Swartz) Willd.

Subspecies
- Freziera undulata var. elegans (Tul.) Krug & Urb., 1896; Freziera undulata var. hirsuta

Synonyms
- Cleyera elegans (Tul.) Choisy; Eroteum undulatum Sw.; Eurotium undulatum Kuntze; Eurya undulata Blume; Freziera elegans Tul.; Freziera hirsuta Sm.; Freziera perrottetiana Tul.; Freziera salicifolia (DC.) Choisy; Freziera salicifolia var. undulata (Sw.) Wawra; Freziera undulata var. elegans (Tul.) Krug & Urb.; Freziera undulata var. hirsuta (Sm.) Krug & Urb.

Species of flowering plant

Freziera undulata is a species of flowering plants in the family Pentaphylacaceae. It is found in the Caribbean (Dominica, Guadeloupe, Saba, St. Kitts, Grenada, Martinique, St. Vincent).
