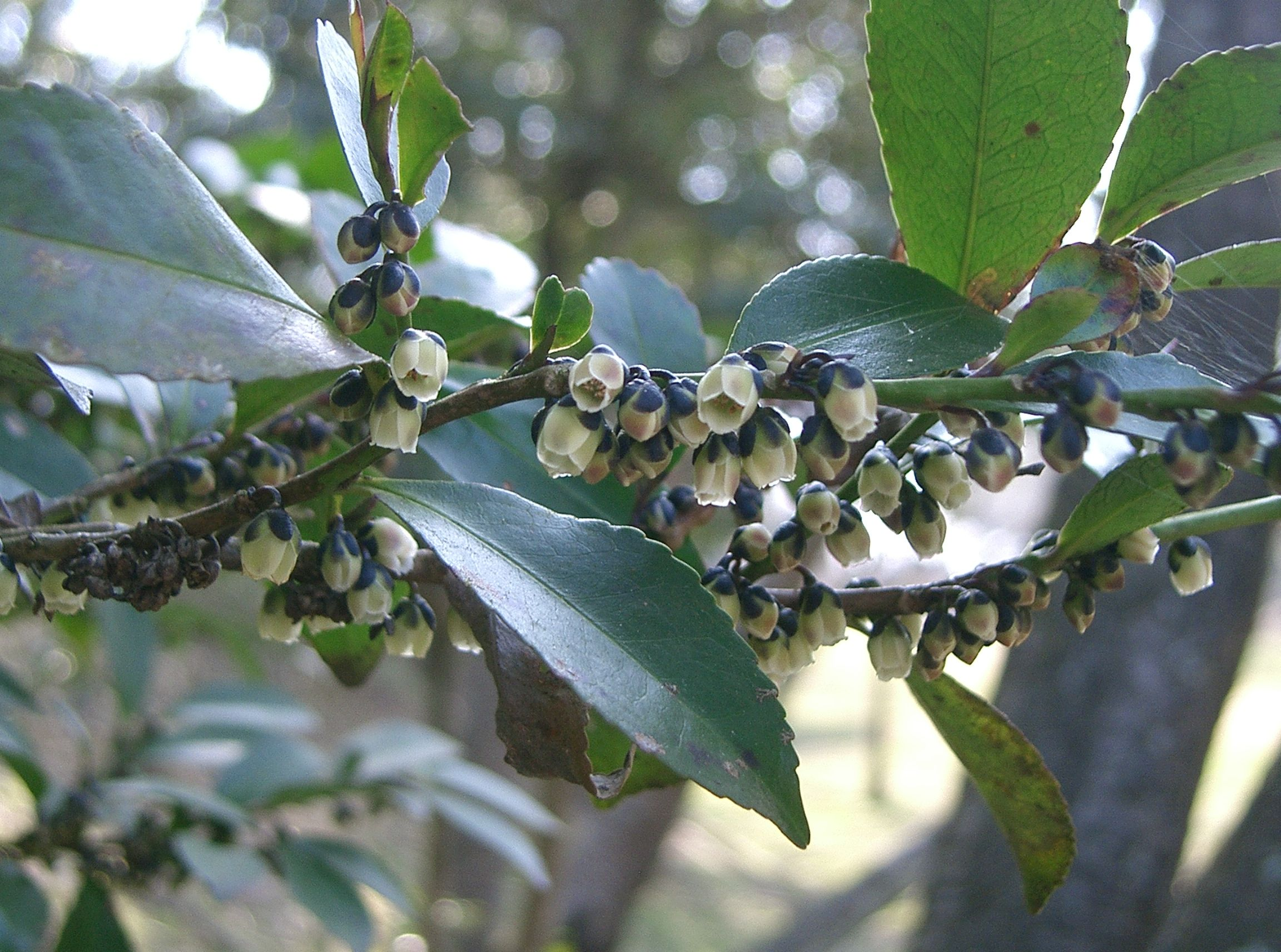
- Flowering branch

Scientific classification
- Kingdom: Plantae
- Clade: Tracheophytes
- Clade: Angiosperms
- Clade: Eudicots
- Clade: Asterids
- Order: Ericales
- Family: Pentaphylacaceae
- Genus: Eurya
- Species: E. japonica

Binomial name
- Eurya japonica Thunb.

Synonyms
- Eurya latifolia hort. ex K.Koch

= Eurya japonica =

Species of flowering plant

Eurya japonica, known as East Asian eurya, is a 1–3.5 m tall shrub in the Pentaphylacaceae family.

It is found in eastern China, Korea, and Japan. It is used as an ornamental plant. In shinto it is a sacred tree, whose leaves are used as sacrificial offerings.
