= Freziera sessiliflora =

Conservation status
- Least Concern (IUCN 3.1)

Scientific classification
- Kingdom: Plantae
- Clade: Tracheophytes
- Clade: Angiosperms
- Clade: Eudicots
- Clade: Asterids
- Order: Ericales
- Family: Pentaphylacaceae
- Genus: Freziera
- Species: F. sessiliflora

Binomial name
- Freziera sessiliflora A.H.Gentry

Species of plant

Freziera sessiliflora is a species of plant in the Pentaphylacaceae family. It is endemic to Colombia.
