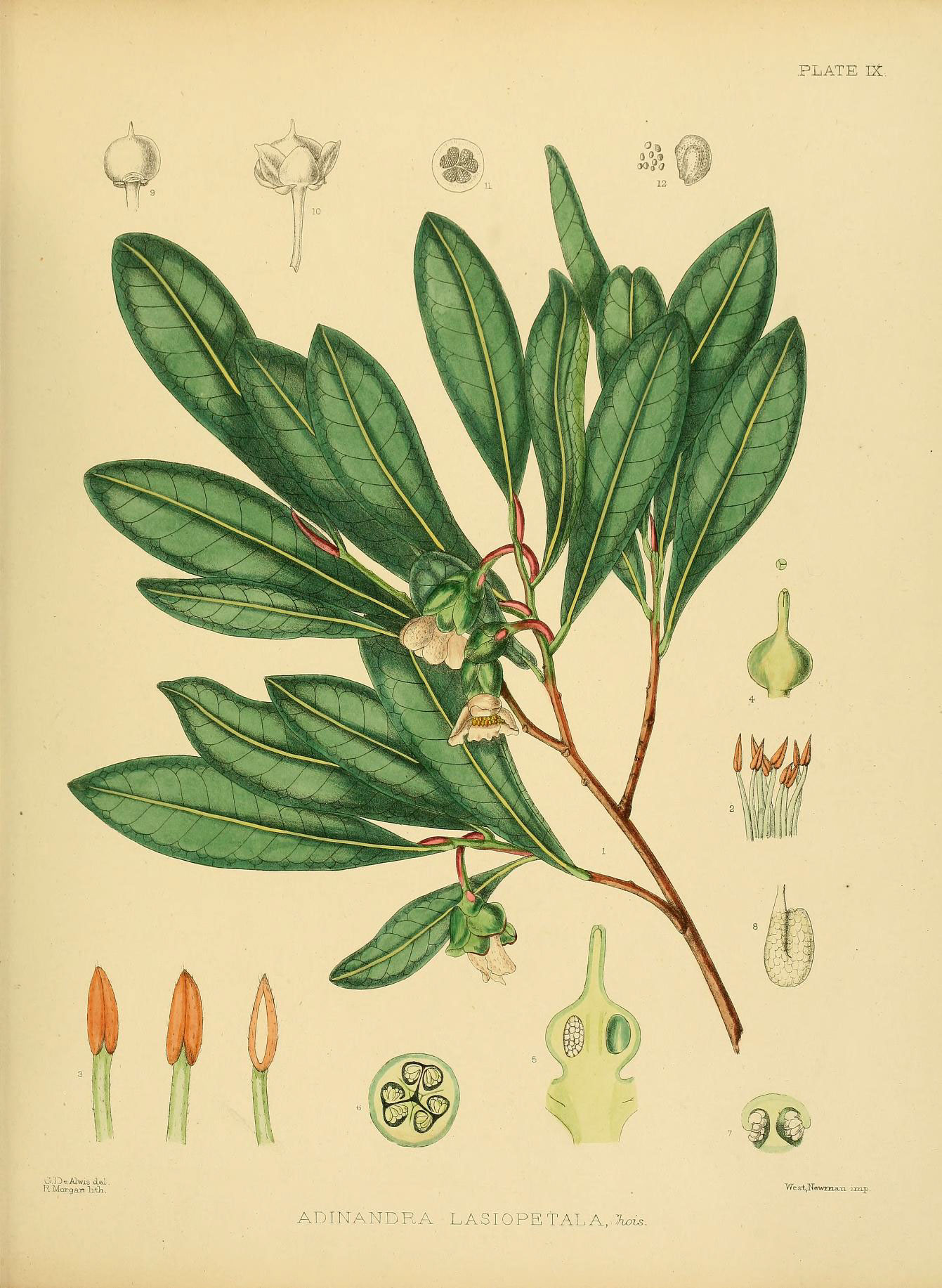

Scientific classification
- Kingdom: Plantae
- Clade: Tracheophytes
- Clade: Angiosperms
- Clade: Eudicots
- Clade: Asterids
- Order: Ericales
- Family: Pentaphylacaceae
- Genus: Adinandra
- Species: A. lasiopetala

Binomial name
- Adinandra lasiopetala (Wight) Choisy

= Adinandra lasiopetala =

Species of tree

Adinandra lasiopetala is a species of plant in the Pentaphylacaceae family. It is endemic to Sri Lanka.

== Uses ==
Wood - light construction.

== Culture ==
Known as "රට මිහිරිය - rata mihiriya" in Sinhala.
