= Freziera forerorum =

Conservation status
- Data Deficient (IUCN 3.1)

Scientific classification
- Kingdom: Plantae
- Clade: Embryophytes
- Clade: Tracheophytes
- Clade: Spermatophytes
- Clade: Angiosperms
- Clade: Eudicots
- Clade: Asterids
- Order: Ericales
- Family: Pentaphylacaceae
- Genus: Freziera
- Species: F. forerorum

Binomial name
- Freziera forerorum A.H.Gentry

Species of flowering plant

Freziera forerorum is a species of flowering plant in the Pentaphylacaceae family. It is a tree endemic to Panama.
