= Freziera subintegrifolia =

Conservation status
- Critically Endangered (IUCN 2.3)

Scientific classification
- Kingdom: Plantae
- Clade: Tracheophytes
- Clade: Angiosperms
- Clade: Eudicots
- Clade: Asterids
- Order: Ericales
- Family: Pentaphylacaceae
- Genus: Freziera
- Species: F. subintegrifolia

Binomial name
- Freziera subintegrifolia (Rusby) Kobuski

Species of flowering plant

Freziera subintegrifolia is a species of plant in the Pentaphylacaceae family. It is endemic to Bolivia.
