= Freziera tomentosa =

Conservation status
- Least Concern (IUCN 3.1)

Scientific classification
- Kingdom: Plantae
- Clade: Tracheophytes
- Clade: Angiosperms
- Clade: Eudicots
- Clade: Asterids
- Order: Ericales
- Family: Pentaphylacaceae
- Genus: Freziera
- Species: F. tomentosa

Binomial name
- Freziera tomentosa (Ruiz & Pav.) Tul.

Synonyms
- Eroteum tomentosum (Ruiz & Pav.) Kuntze; Lettsomia tomentosa Ruiz & Pav.; Eroteum dombeyanum (Tul.) Kuntze; Eroteum sericeum (Bonpl.) Kuntze; Eurya dombeyana (Tul.) Szyszył.; Eurya sericea (Bonpl.) Blume; Freziera dombeyana Tul.; Freziera hirsuta Seem.; Freziera sericea Bonpl.; Freziera sericea var. typica Wawra; Lettsomia dombeyana Choisy

Species of flowering plant

Freziera tomentosa is a species of flowering plant in the family Pentaphylacaceae. It is found in Colombia, Ecuador, Peru, and Venezuela.
