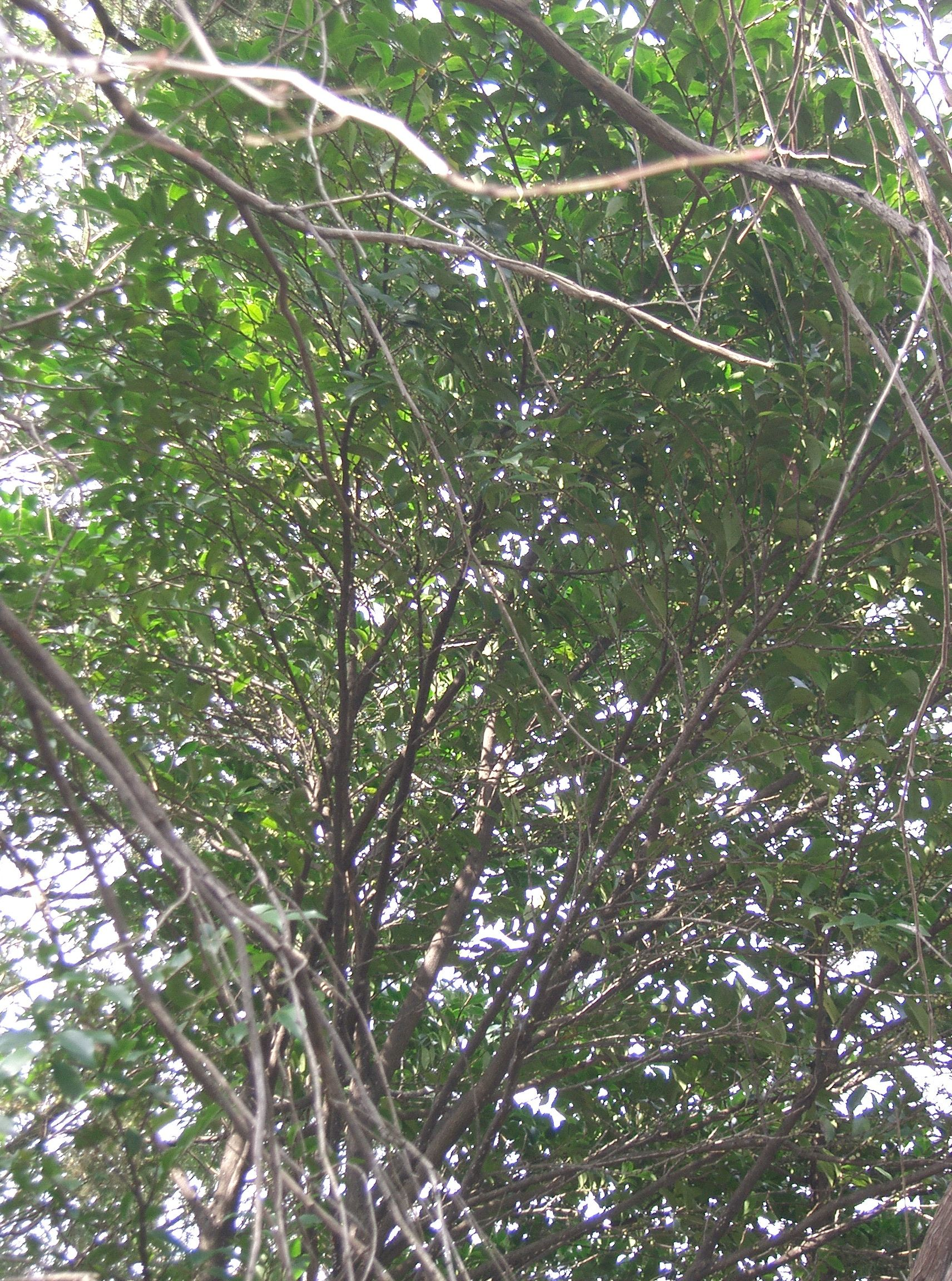
- Eurya japonica, habitus

Scientific classification
- Kingdom: Plantae
- Clade: Tracheophytes
- Clade: Angiosperms
- Clade: Eudicots
- Clade: Asterids
- Order: Ericales
- Family: Pentaphylacaceae
- Tribe: Freziereae
- Genus: Eurya; Thunb.

Species
- See text

= Eurya =

Genus of flowering plants

Eurya is a genus of flowering plants in the family Pentaphylacaceae.

== Fossil record ==
Several fossil seeds of Eurya stigmosa have been described from Middle Miocene strata of the Fasterholt area near Silkeborg in central Jutland, Denmark. E. stigmosa is also known from Pliocene Portugal. Eurya macrofossils have also been described from late Zanclean strata of the Pliocene in Pocapaglia, Italy. Seed fossils of Eurya stigmosa were also reported from the Early Pleistocene (Calabrian stage) of Madeira Island (Atlantic Ocean, Portugal)

== Species ==
The genus contains 163 species.

- Eurya emarginata
- Eurya japonica Thunb.
- Eurya rapensis F.Brown
- Eurya rengechiensis Yamamoto (Taiwan)
- Eurya sandwicensis A.Gray - Ānini (Hawaiʻi)

The leaves of Eurya are eaten by caterpillars of some Lepidoptera, such as the engrailed (Ectropis crepuscularia).
