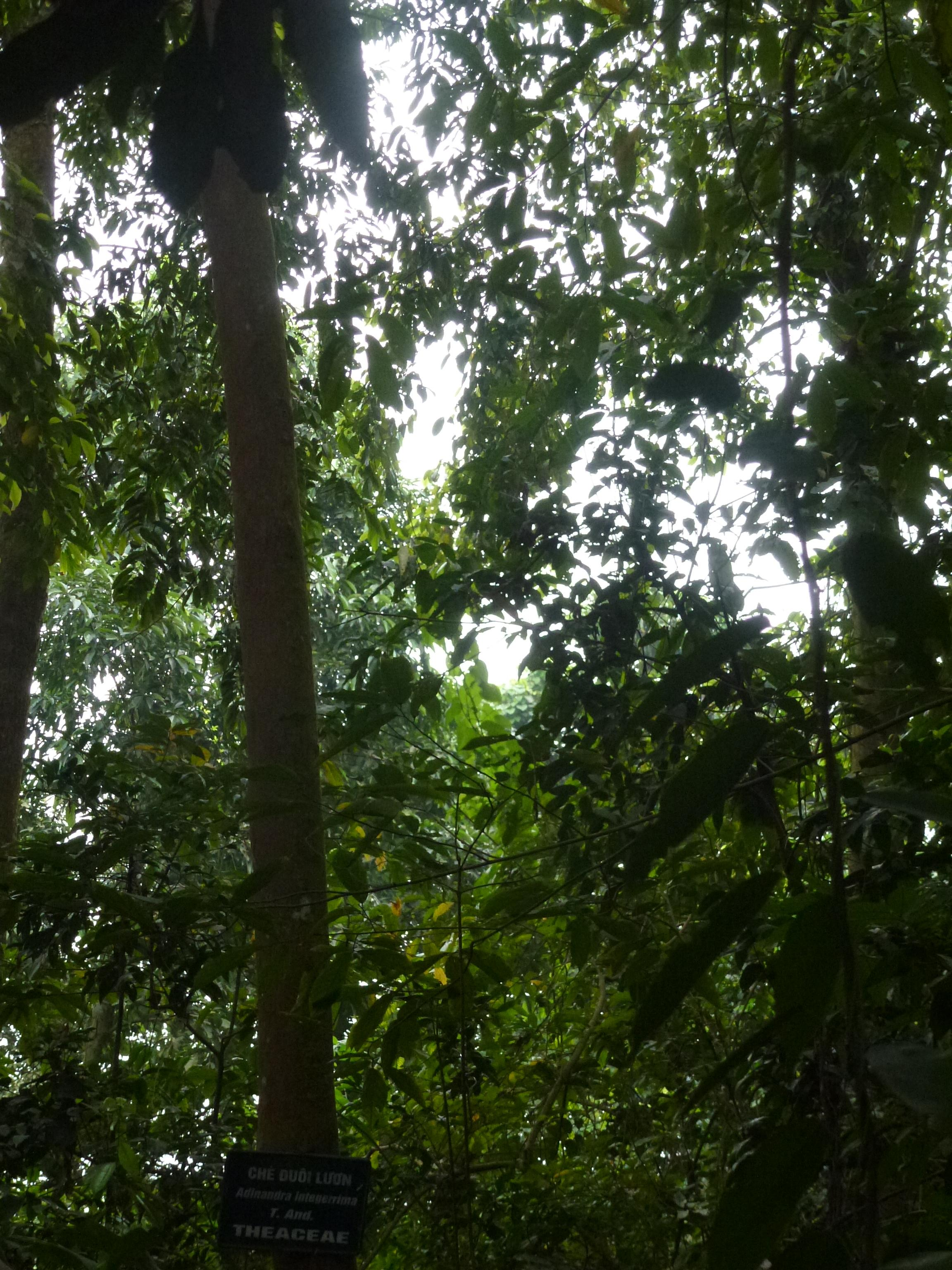
- Adinandra integerrima

Scientific classification
- Kingdom: Plantae
- Clade: Tracheophytes
- Clade: Angiosperms
- Clade: Eudicots
- Clade: Asterids
- Order: Ericales
- Family: Pentaphylacaceae
- Tribe: Freziereae
- Genus: Adinandra; Jack

= Adinandra =

Genus of flowering plants

Adinandra is a genus of plant in the family Pentaphylacaceae. It contains the following species:

1. Adinandra acuminata Korth.
2. Adinandra acuta Korth.
3. Adinandra angulata Ridl.
4. Adinandra angustifolia (S.H.Chun ex H.G.Ye) B.M.Barthol. & T.L.Ming
5. Adinandra anisobasis Kobuski
6. Adinandra annamensis Gagnep. ex Kobuski
7. Adinandra apoensis Elmer
8. Adinandra argentifolia Sugau
9. Adinandra auriformis L.K.Ling & S.X.Liang
10. Adinandra bicuspidata Kobuski
11. Adinandra bockiana E.Pritz. ex Diels
12. Adinandra borneensis Kobuski
13. Adinandra brassii Kobuski
14. Adinandra brefeldii Koord.
15. Adinandra calciphila Sugau
16. Adinandra caudata Gagnep. ex Kobuski
17. Adinandra celebica Koord.
18. Adinandra clemensiae Kobuski
19. Adinandra coarctata Craib
20. Adinandra collettiana T.K.Paul
21. Adinandra collina Kobuski
22. Adinandra colombonensis Kobuski
23. Adinandra cordifolia Ridl.
24. Adinandra corneriana Kobuski
25. Adinandra crassifolia Sugau
26. Adinandra dasyantha Korth.
27. Adinandra donnaiensis Gagnep. ex Kobuski
28. Adinandra dubia Kobuski
29. Adinandra dumosa Jack, Tiup-tiup tree
30. Adinandra elegans F.C.How & W.C.Ko ex Hung T.Chang
31. Adinandra elliptica C.B.Rob.
32. Adinandra endertii Kobuski
33. Adinandra epunctata Merr. & Chun
34. Adinandra excelsa Korth.
35. Adinandra eymae Kobuski
36. Adinandra filipes Merr. ex Kobuski
37. Adinandra forbesii Baker f.
38. Adinandra formosana Hayata
39. Adinandra gallatlyi R.N.Paul
40. Adinandra glischroloma Hand.-Mazz.
41. Adinandra grandifolia Hien & Yakovlev
42. Adinandra grandis L.K.Ling
43. Adinandra griffithii Dyer
44. Adinandra hainanensis Hayata
45. Adinandra hirta Gagnep.
46. Adinandra hongiaoensis Son & L.V.Dung
47. Adinandra howii Merr. & Chun
48. Adinandra impressa Kobuski
49. Adinandra inaequalis Sugau
50. Adinandra integerrima T.Anderson ex Dyer
51. Adinandra javanica Choisy
52. Adinandra kamalae M.K.Pathak, Bhaumik & G.Krishna
53. Adinandra kjellbergii Kobuski
54. Adinandra kostermansii Sugau
55. Adinandra lancipetala L.K.Ling
56. Adinandra laotica Gagnep.
57. Adinandra laronensis Kobuski
58. Adinandra lasiopetala (Wright) Choisy
59. Adinandra lasiostyla Hayata
60. Adinandra latifolia L.K.Ling
61. Adinandra lenticellata Sugau
62. Adinandra leytensis Merr.
63. Adinandra lienii Hien & Yakovlev
64. Adinandra loerzingiana Kobuski
65. Adinandra loheri Merr.
66. Adinandra longipedicellata Sugau
67. Adinandra luzonica Merr.
68. Adinandra macgregorii Merr.
69. Adinandra macquilingensis Merr.
70. Adinandra maculosa T.Anderson ex Dyer
71. Adinandra magniflora Kobuski
72. Adinandra masambensis Kobuski
73. Adinandra megaphylla Hu
74. Adinandra mendamitensis Sugau
75. Adinandra meratusensis Sugau
76. Adinandra microcarpa Gagnep.
77. Adinandra millettii (Hook. & Arn.) Benth. & Hook.f. ex Hance
78. Adinandra myrioneura Kobuski
79. Adinandra nigroglandulosa L.K.Ling
80. Adinandra nigropunctata Merr.
81. Adinandra nitida Merr. ex H.L.Li
82. Adinandra nunkokensis Kobuski
83. Adinandra oblonga Craib
84. Adinandra obtusata Korth.
85. Adinandra pangiensis Sugau
86. Adinandra parvifolia Ridl.
87. Adinandra pingbianensis L.K.Ling
88. Adinandra plagiobasis Airy Shaw
89. Adinandra poilanei Gagnep.
90. Adinandra polyneura Kobuski
91. Adinandra quinquepartita Kobuski
92. Adinandra rantepaoensis Kobuski
93. Adinandra retusa D.Fang & D.H.Qin
94. Adinandra rubiginosa Kobuski
95. Adinandra ryukyuensis Masam.
96. Adinandra sadaui Sugau
97. Adinandra sarosanthera Miq.
98. Adinandra steenisii Kobuski
99. Adinandra subauriculata Kobuski
100. Adinandra subsessilis Airy Shaw
101. Adinandra subunguiculata Kobuski
102. Adinandra sylvestris Jacq.
103. Adinandra tomentosa Sugau
104. Adinandra verrucosa Stapf
105. Adinandra villosa Choisy
106. Adinandra yaeyamensis Ohwi
