= Symplococarpon =

Scientific classification
- Kingdom: Plantae
- Clade: Tracheophytes
- Clade: Angiosperms
- Clade: Eudicots
- Clade: Asterids
- Order: Ericales
- Family: Pentaphylacaceae
- Genus: Symplococarpon; Airy Shaw

Genus of flowering plants

Symplococarpon is a genus of flowering plants belonging to the family Pentaphylacaceae.

Its native range is Mexico to Venezuela.

Species:

- Symplococarpon flavifolium Lundell
- Symplococarpon purpusii (Brandegee) Kobuski
