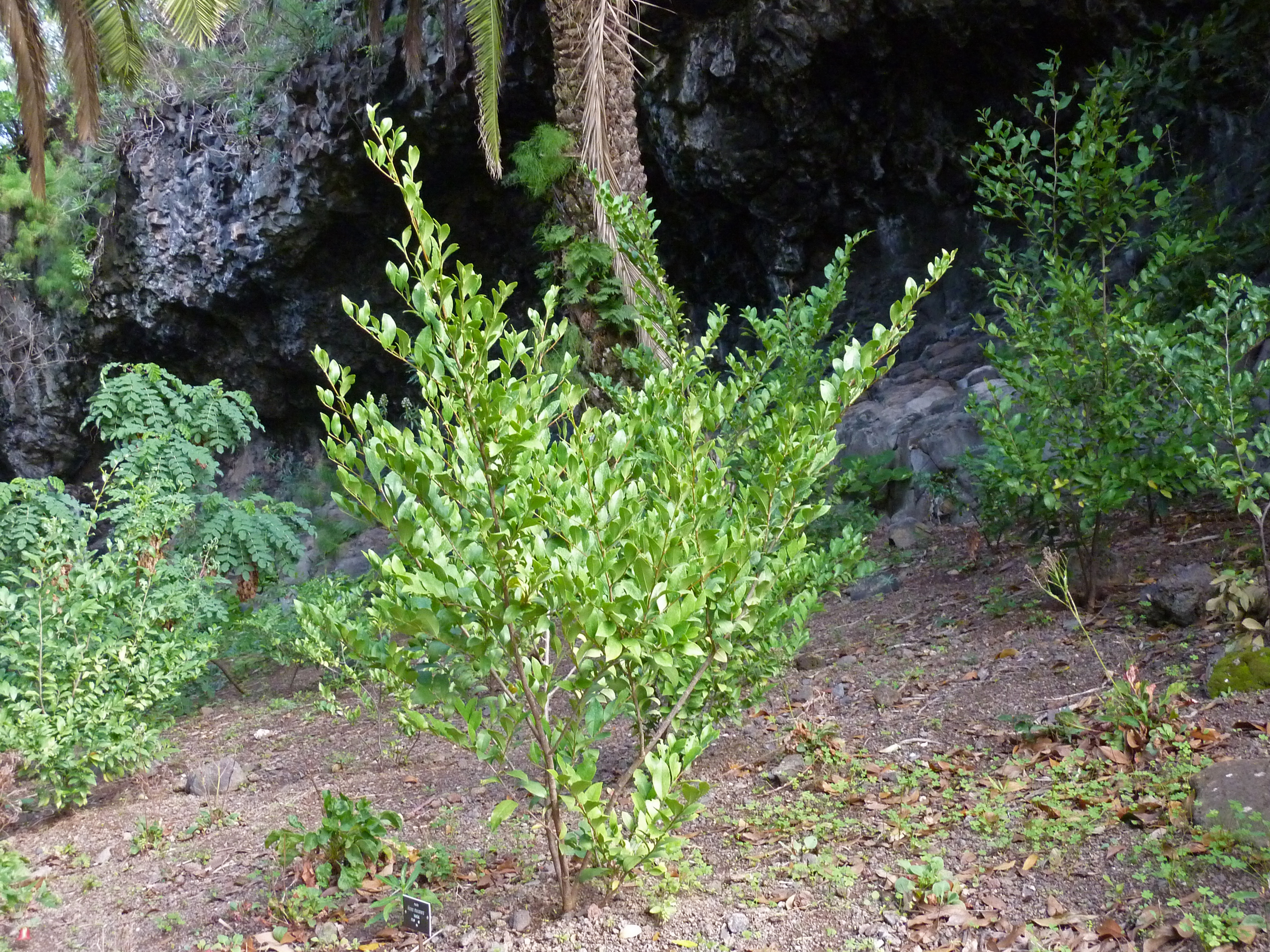
- Visnea mocanera

Conservation status
- Least Concern (IUCN 3.1)

Scientific classification
- Kingdom: Plantae
- Clade: Tracheophytes
- Clade: Angiosperms
- Clade: Eudicots
- Clade: Asterids
- Order: Ericales
- Family: Pentaphylacaceae
- Genus: Visnea; L.f. (1782)
- Species: V. mocanera

Binomial name
- Visnea mocanera L.f. (1782)

Synonyms
- Mocanera Juss. (1789); Mocanera canariensis J.St.-Hil. (1805); Visnea canariensis Oken (1841)

= Visnea =

Monotypic genus of flowering plants

Visnea is a monotypic genus of flowering plants in family Pentaphylacaceae. The genus contains a single species, Visnea mocanera a tree native to the Canary Islands and Madeira.

The fruits of the tree (known as Mocan) are edible.

The genus name of Visnea is in honour of Gérard de Visme (c. 1725 – c. 1797), a French and English merchant in Lisbon, Portugal. The genus was first described by Carl Linnaeus the Younger in 1782, and published in Suppl. Pl. on page 36.

Note; Visnea Steud. ex Endl. is a synonym of Barbacenia, a genus in a different family.

== Fossil record ==
Four fossil seeds of a Visnea sp. have been described from middle Miocene strata of the Fasterholt area near Silkeborg in Central Jutland, Denmark.
