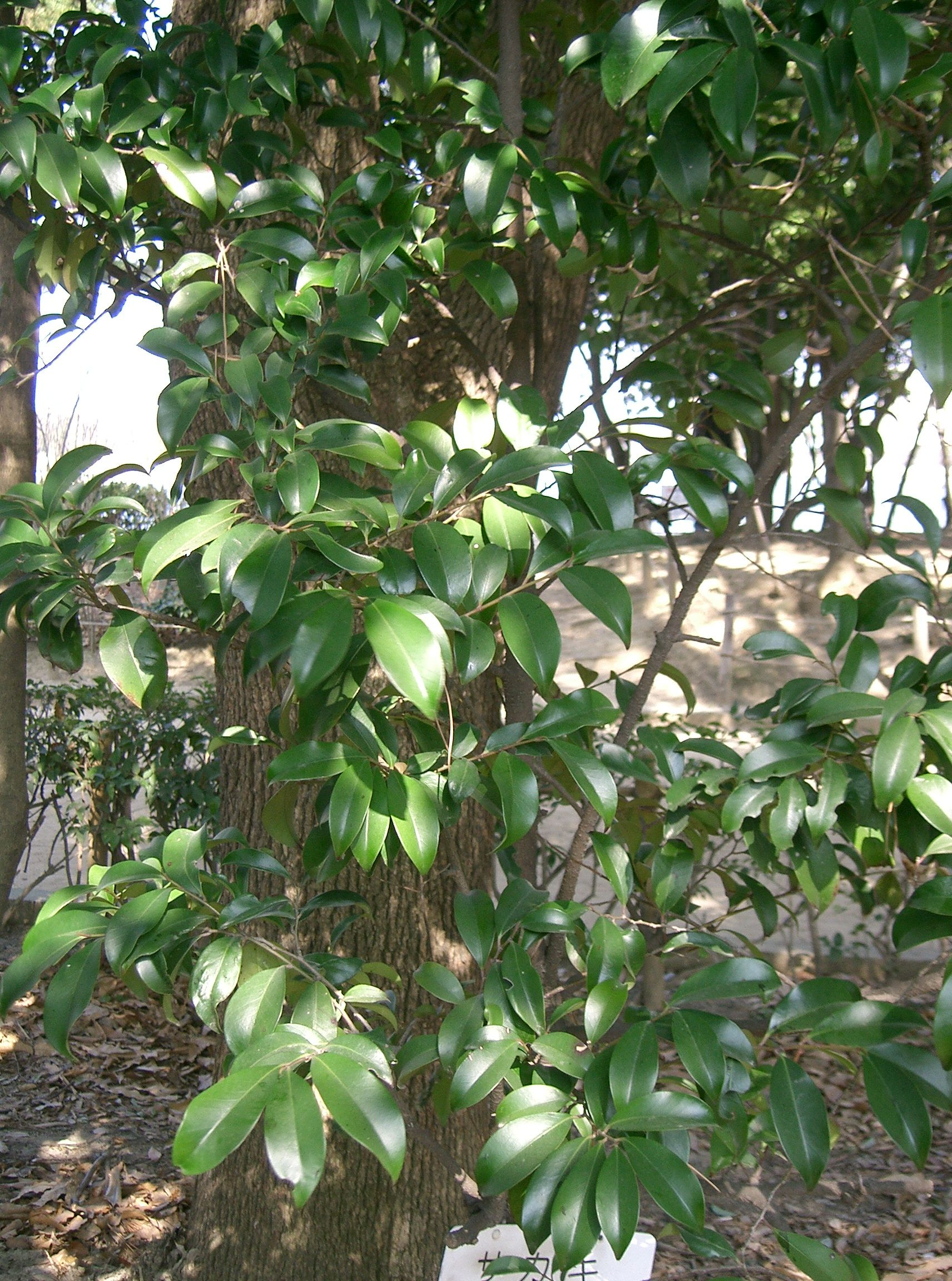
- Cleyera japonica

Scientific classification
- Kingdom: Plantae
- Clade: Tracheophytes
- Clade: Angiosperms
- Clade: Eudicots
- Clade: Asterids
- Order: Ericales
- Family: Pentaphylacaceae
- Genus: Cleyera; Thunb.

Species
- See text

= Cleyera =

Genus of flowering plants

Cleyera is a plant genus consisting of 21 species of tender, evergreen shrubs to small trees, mostly native to Mexico and Central America, and one from Eastern Asia. In the APG III system it is placed in the family Pentaphylacaceae.

The botanical name is derived from Andrew Cleyer, a Dutch physician of the seventeenth century. The plants are grown for specimen accent hedges or mixed border landscapes. Though they are slow-growing, they can eventually reach 6–10 ft (1.8-3m). The plants grow densely upright with low spreading-branch habit, round-shaped form, and can be kept compact by occasionally tip-cutting. Leaves are glossy, oval-shaped, 6–10 cm long with dark-green and bronze-red to burgundy tinted young leaves. Very fragrant small creamy white to pale yellow flowers bloom in early summer with petals free or scarcely coalesced. The pollen can cause mild allergy symptoms. Fruits are spherical, greenish yellow, turning red to black.

== Species ==
Accepted species

- Cleyera albopunctata (Griseb.) Krug & Urb.
- Cleyera bolleana (O.C.Schmidt) Kobuski
- Cleyera cernua (Tul.) Kobuski
- Cleyera costaricensis Kobuski
- Cleyera cuspidata H.T.Chang & S.H.Shi
- Cleyera ekmanii (O.C.Schmidt) Kobuski
- Cleyera incornuta Y.C.Wu
- Cleyera integrifolia (Benth.) Choisy
- Cleyera japonica Thunb. (syn. Cleyera ochnacea) sakaki
- Cleyera longicarpa (Yamam.) L.K. Ling
- Cleyera matudai Kobuski
- Cleyera neibensis Alain
- Cleyera nimanimae (Tul.) Krug & Urb.
- Cleyera obovata H.T.Chang
- Cleyera obscurinervia (Merr. & Chun) H.T.Chang
- Cleyera orbicularis Alain
- Cleyera pachyphylla Chun ex H.T.Chang
- Cleyera panamensis (Standl.) Kobuski
- Cleyera revoluta Kobuski
- Cleyera serrulata Choisy
- Cleyera skutchii Kobuski
- Cleyera tacanensis Kobuski
- Cleyera ternstroemioides (O.C.Schmidt) Kobuski
- Cleyera theoides (Sw.) Choisy
- Cleyera vaccinioides (O.C.Schmidt) Kobuski
- Cleyera velutina B.M.Barthol.
- Cleyera yangchunensis L.K.Ling

Unresolved species

- Cleyera dubia Champ. ex Benth.
- Cleyera fragrans Champ. ex Benth.
- Cleyera gymnanthera Wight & Arn.
- Cleyera millettii Hook. & Arn.
- Cleyera pentapetala Spreng.

Names brought to synonymy

- Cleyera elegans, a synonym for Freziera undulata
