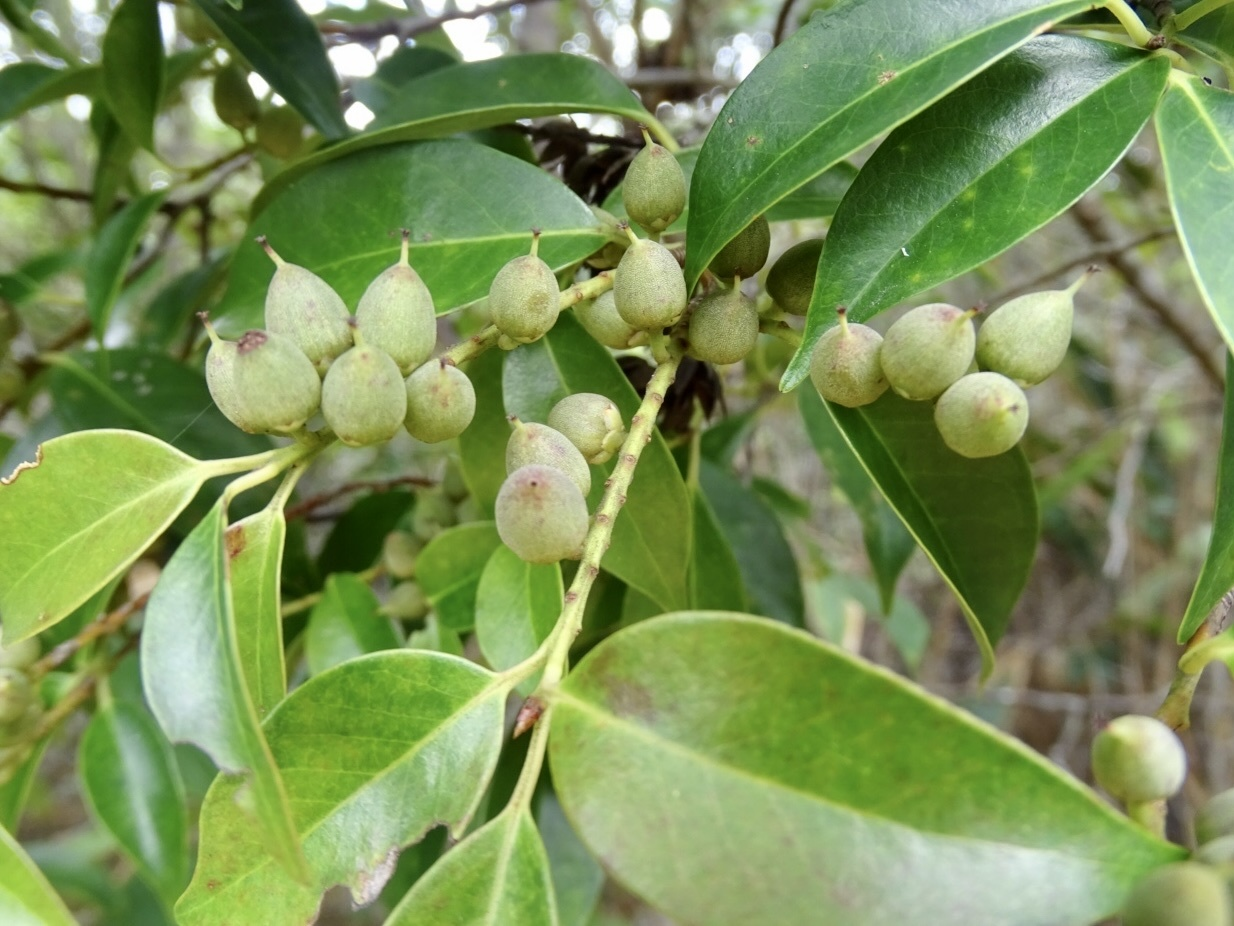

Scientific classification
- Kingdom: Plantae
- Clade: Tracheophytes
- Clade: Angiosperms
- Clade: Eudicots
- Clade: Asterids
- Order: Ericales
- Family: Pentaphylacaceae
- Tribe: Pentaphylaceae; P.F.Stevens & A.L.Weitzman
- Genus: Pentaphylax; Gardner & Champ. (1849)
- Species: P. euryoides

Binomial name
- Pentaphylax euryoides Gardner & Champ. (1849)

Synonyms
- Pentaphylax arborea Ridl. (1925); Pentaphylax malayana Ridl. (1908); Pentaphylax racemosa Merr. & Chun (1930); Pentaphylax spicata Merr. (1938)

= Pentaphylax =

Genus of flowering plants

Pentaphylax euryoides (Chinese: 五列木; pinyin: wu lie mu) is a species of flowering plant in the Pentaphylacaceae family. It is the sole species in genus Pentaphylax. It is a shrub or small tree native to southern China, Vietnam, Laos, Peninsular Malaysia, and northern Sumatra. In China, it is found in Guangdong, Guangxi, Guizhou, Hainan, and Yunnan provinces, and in southern parts of Fujian, Hunan, and Jiangxi.

== Description ==
The species is 4–10 metres (13–33 ft) tall with its petioles being 1–1.5 centimetres (0.39–0.59 in) long. The species has simple evergreen leaves that are alternately arranged on the stems. The leaf-blades are lanceolate, oblong, ovate and are 5–9 centimetres (2.0–3.5 in) long by 2–5 centimetres (0.79–1.97 in) wide. Pedicels are 0.5 millimetres (0.020 in) and carry triangular shaped bracteoles which are as long as the petiole.

Flowers have five petals and five sepals that are distinct from each other and five stamens attached oppositely to the sepals. Sepals are 1.5–2.5 millimetres (0.059–0.098 in) long and orbicular. The flower pistil is 5 celled and the anthers dehiscing via pores and basifixed. The five stamens are 1 millimetre (0.039 in) and oblong. The seeds are winged, reddish-brown in colour, and 1.5–2 millimetres (0.059–0.079 in) long.

== Taxonomy ==
The APG III system of 2009 places the genus in the family Pentaphylacaceae, along with genera formerly placed in the Ternstroemiaceae. Pentaphylax has often been placed in its own family, the Pentaphylacaceae, separated from the Theaceae or Ternstroemiaceae based on the structure of the anthers and, arguably, the ovules. However, some molecular data and curved embryos (typical of the Ternstroemiaceae) point to a close relationship with the Ternstroemiaceae.

The taxonomic placement of this species and the family has varied, due mostly to a shortage of information. Included here are some classifications given by different botanists:

- Short's Subclass Dicotyledonae; Crassinucelli (?).
- Dahlgren's Superorder Theiflorae (?); Theales (?).
- Cronquist’s Subclass Dilleniidae; Theales.
- Angiosperm Phylogeny Group (1998) family of uncertain position at the highest group level.
- subfamily Ternstroemioideae within the Theaceae.
