= Euryodendron =

Conservation status
- Critically Endangered (IUCN 3.1)

Scientific classification
- Kingdom: Plantae
- Clade: Tracheophytes
- Clade: Angiosperms
- Clade: Eudicots
- Clade: Asterids
- Order: Ericales
- Family: Pentaphylacaceae
- Genus: Euryodendron; H.T.Chang
- Species: E. excelsum

Binomial name
- Euryodendron excelsum H.T.Chang

Genus of flowering plants

Euryodendron is a genus of plant in family Pentaphylacaceae. The genus currently contains a single species, Euryodendron excelsum. It is endemic to China. It is threatened by habitat loss.

A 2017 survey carried out in Guangdong Province found the species close to extinction, with only 76 trees left. A further 300 trees have been planted in an attempt to save the species.
