= Freziera ferruginea =

Conservation status
- Vulnerable (IUCN 2.3)

Scientific classification
- Kingdom: Plantae
- Clade: Tracheophytes
- Clade: Angiosperms
- Clade: Eudicots
- Clade: Asterids
- Order: Ericales
- Family: Pentaphylacaceae
- Genus: Freziera
- Species: F. ferruginea

Binomial name
- Freziera ferruginea Wawra

Synonyms
- Eroteum ferrugineum (Wawra) Kuntze; Eurya ferruginea (Wawra) Szyszył.; Lettsomia ferruginea Ruiz & Pav.

Species of plant

Freziera ferruginea is a species of plant in the Pentaphylacaceae family. It is endemic to Peru.
