= Anneslea =

Scientific classification
- Kingdom: Plantae
- Clade: Tracheophytes
- Clade: Angiosperms
- Clade: Eudicots
- Clade: Asterids
- Order: Ericales
- Family: Pentaphylacaceae
- Genus: Anneslea; Wall.

Genus of flowering plants

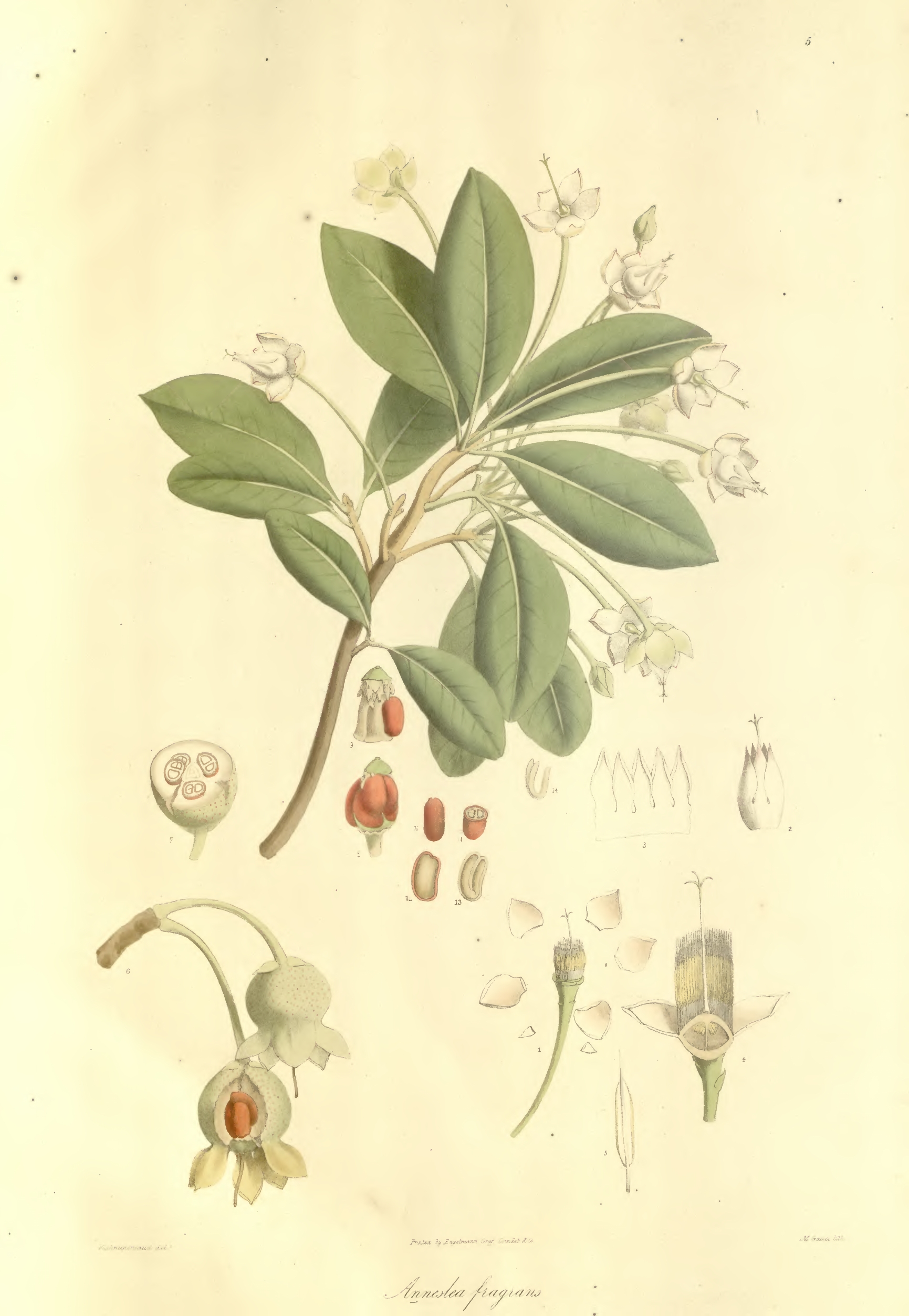
Anneslea fragrans

Anneslea is a genus of flowering plants belonging to the family Pentaphylacaceae.

Its native range is Nepal to Taiwan and Sumatra.

Species:

- Anneslea donnaiensis (Gagnep.) Kobuski
- Anneslea fragrans Wall.
- Anneslea paradoxa H.H.Nguyen & Yakovlev
- Anneslea steenisii Kobuski
