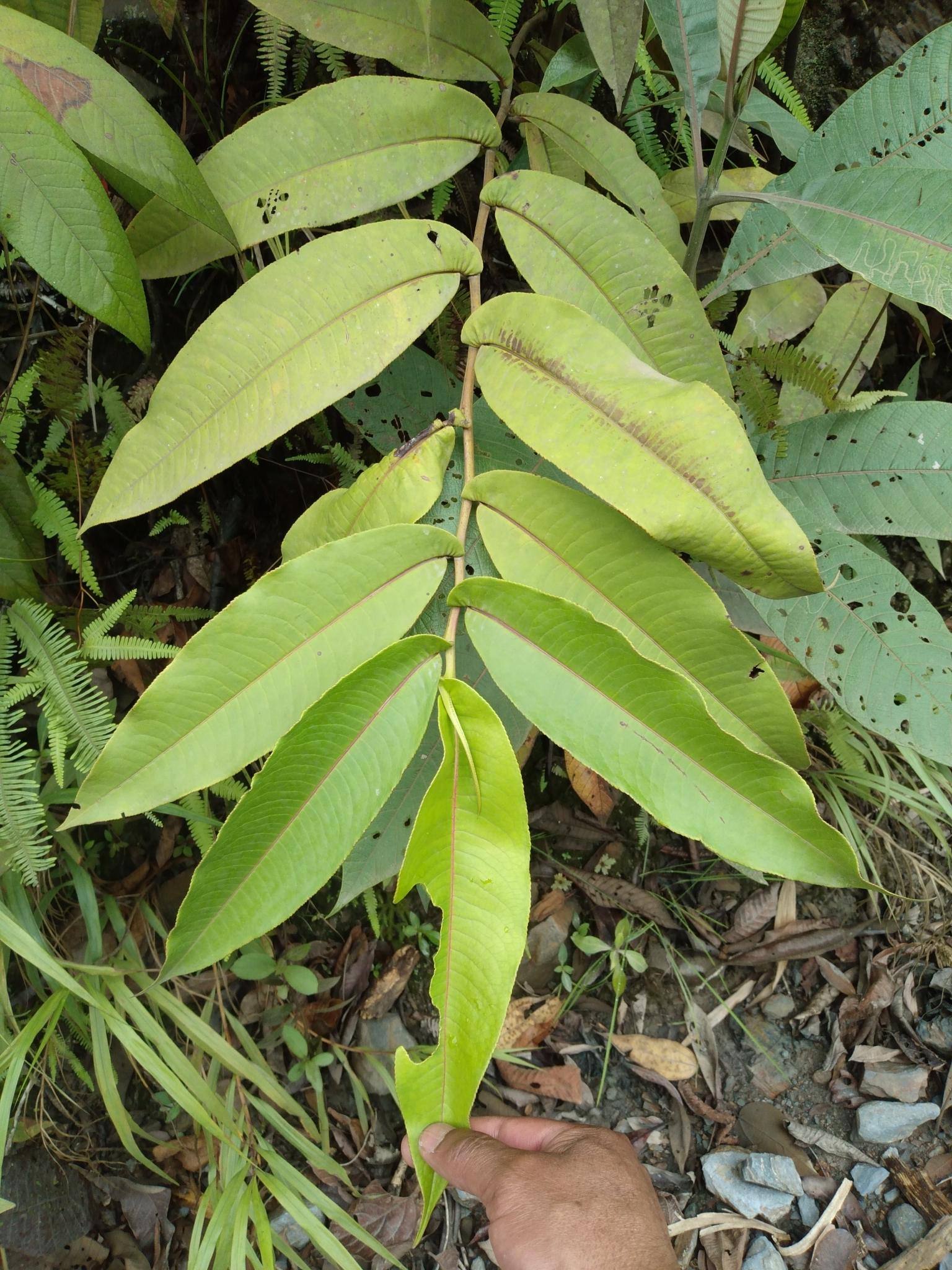
- Freziera angulosa

Scientific classification
- Kingdom: Plantae
- Clade: Tracheophytes
- Clade: Angiosperms
- Clade: Eudicots
- Clade: Asterids
- Order: Ericales
- Family: Pentaphylacaceae
- Tribe: Freziereae
- Genus: Freziera; Sw. ex Willd. (1799), nom. cons.

Synonyms
- Eroteum Sw.; Erotium Kuntze, orth. var.; Killipiodendron Kobuski; Lettsomia Ruiz & Pav.; Patascoya Urb.

= Freziera =

Genus of flowering plants

Freziera is a Neotropical genus of trees (or rarely shrubs) in the family Pentaphylacaceae. It includes 79 species native to the tropical Americas, ranging from Mexico and Cuba to Bolivia and eastern Brazil.

== Species ==
79 species are accepted.

- Freziera aguilarii D.Santam.
- Freziera alata A.L.Weitzman ex D.Santam. & A.K.Monro
- Freziera angulosa Tul.
- Freziera antioquensis D.Santam. & Betancur
- Freziera apolobambensis D.Santam. & A.Fuentes
- Freziera arbutifolia Triana & Planch.
- Freziera atlantica Zorzan. & Amorim
- Freziera bonplandiana Tul.
- Freziera bradleyi D.Santam. & Q.Jiménez
- Freziera caloneura Kobuski
- Freziera calophylla Triana & Planch.
- Freziera candicans Tul.
- Freziera canescens Bonpl.
- Freziera carinata A.L.Weitzman
- Freziera chrysophylla Bonpl.
- Freziera conocarpa (O.C.Schmidt) Kobuski
- Freziera cordata Tul.
- Freziera croatii D.Santam. & A.K.Monro
- Freziera cuatrecasasii Kobuski
- Freziera cyanocantha A.L.Weitzman ex D.Santam.
- Freziera dasycarpa D.Santam. & R.Ortiz
- Freziera dauphinii D.Santam.
- Freziera dudleyi A.H.Gentry
- Freziera echinata A.L.Weitzman
- Freziera ecuadoriensis D.Santam. & A.K.Monro
- Freziera erickitae A.Fuentes
- Freziera euryoides Kobuski
- Freziera ferruginea Wawra
- Freziera forerorum A.H.Gentry
- Freziera friedrichsthailana (Szysz.) Kobuski
- Freziera golondrinensis D.Santam. & A.K.Monro
- Freziera grandiflora D.Santam., D.A.Neill & Lagom.
- Freziera grisebachii Krug & Urb.
- Freziera guaramacalana D.Santam. & Cuello
- Freziera guatemalensis (Donn.Sm.) Kobuski
- Freziera hieronymi Kobuski
- Freziera humiriifolia D.Santam.
- Freziera ilicioides Tul.
- Freziera inaequilatera Britton
- Freziera incana A.L.Weitzman
- Freziera jaramilloi A.H.Gentry
- Freziera jefensis D.Santam.
- Freziera karsteniana (Szyszył.) Kobuski
- Freziera lanata (Ruiz & Pav.) Tul.
- Freziera lancifolia (Standl.) Kobuski
- Freziera longipes Tulasne
- Freziera magnibracteolata A.Fuentes & D.Santam.
- Freziera microphylla Sandwith
- Freziera minima A.L.Weitzman
- Freziera monsonensis (Melch.) Kobuski
- Freziera monteagudoi D.Santam. & A.K.Monro
- Freziera monteverdensis D.Santam., Lagom. & Q.Jiménez
- Freziera neei D.Santam. & A.K.Monro
- Freziera neillii D.Santam.
- Freziera nervosa Bonpl.
- Freziera oxapampensis D.Santam.
- Freziera parva Kobuski
- Freziera peruana D.Santam. & A.K.Monro
- Freziera polita A.L.Weitzman ex J.R.Grande
- Freziera reticulata Bonpl.
- Freziera retinveria Kobuski
- Freziera risaraldana D.Santam. & A.K.Monro
- Freziera roraimensis Tul.
- Freziera rufescens A.L.Weitzman
- Freziera sessiliflora A.H.Gentry
- Freziera siraensis D.Santam. & A.K.Monro
- Freziera smithiana Kobuski
- Freziera spathulifolia (Melch.) Kobuski
- Freziera stuebelii (Hieron.) A.L.Weitzman
- Freziera suberosa Tul.
- Freziera subintegrifolia (Rusby) Kobuski
- Freziera tarariae Q.Jiménez, D.Santam. & A.K.Monro
- Freziera tomentosa Ruiz & Pavón
- Freziera trollii D.Santam. & A.K.Monro
- Freziera tundaymensis D.Santam.
- Freziera undulata (Swartz) Willdenow
- Freziera uniauriculata A.L.Weitzman ex D.Santam. & A.K.Monro
- Freziera verrucosa (Hieron.) Kobuski
- Freziera yanachagensis D.Santam.

The following species are listed by the IUCN Red List but not accepted by the International Plant Names Index and Plants of the World Online:

- Freziera biserrata A.L.Weitzman
- Freziera caesariata A.L.Weitzman
- Freziera campanulata A.L.Weitzman
- Freziera ciliata A.L.Weitzman
- Freziera glabrescens A.L.Weitzman
- Freziera obovata A.L.Weitzman
- Freziera punctata A.L.Weitzman
- Freziera revoluta A.L.Weitzman
- Freziera uncinata A.L.Weitzman
- Freziera varibrateata A.L.Weitzman
- Freziera velutina A.L.Weitzman
