= Archboldiodendron =

Scientific classification
- Kingdom: Plantae
- Clade: Tracheophytes
- Clade: Angiosperms
- Clade: Eudicots
- Clade: Asterids
- Order: Ericales
- Family: Pentaphylacaceae
- Genus: Archboldiodendron; Kobuski (1940)
- Species: A. calosericeum

Binomial name
- Archboldiodendron calosericeum (Diels) Kobuski (1940)

Subspecies
- Archboldiodendron calosericeum subsp. calosericeum; Archboldiodendron calosericeum subsp. kaindiensis W.R.Barker; Archboldiodendron calosericeum subsp. merrillianum (Kobuski) W.R.Barker

Synonyms
- Adinandra calosericea Diels (1922)

Genus of flowering plants

Archboldiodendron calosericeum is a species of flowering plant belonging to the family Pentaphylacaceae. Its native range is New Guinea. It is the sole species in genus Archboldiodendron.

Three subspecies are accepted:

- Archboldiodendron calosericeum subsp. calosericeum
- Archboldiodendron calosericeum subsp. kaindiensis W.R.Barker
- Archboldiodendron calosericeum subsp. merrillianum (Kobuski) W.R.Barker
