= Fagus ferruginea =

Fagus ferruginea may refer to one of the beech species:

- Fagus ferruginea Dryand., a synonym for Fagus grandifolia subsp. grandifolia (American beech)
- Fagus ferruginea Siebold (Invalid), a synonym for Fagus crenata Blume (Japanese beech)
