= Clarence Emmeren Kobuski =

American botanist and biologist

- Born: January 9, 1900; Gloversville, New York, U.S.
- Died: May 9, 1963 (aged 63); Weston, Massachusetts, U.S.
- Citizenship: American
- Education: Cornell University
- Scientific career
- Fields: Botany; Biology
- Workplaces: Harvard
- Author abbrev. (botany): Kobuski

Clarence Emmeren Kobuski (January 9, 1900 – May 9, 1963) was an American botanist and biologist. He was the curator of the Arnold Arboretum and the Gray Herbarium at Harvard University from 1954 until his death in 1963. He never married nor had any children.

== Early life ==
Kobuski was born in Gloversville, New York to Frank Kobuski (October 9, 1867 – December 15, 1939) and Justina Kobuski (née Unger) (February 1872 – ?). Their third of five children and their second son. His father was a baker who owned and operated Kobuski & Solocsky Bakery in Gloversville until his death, when Clarence's brother, Lawrence Kobuski took over.

== Education ==
Clarence received his undergraduate degree in botany from Cornell University in 1924. He went on to study for his doctorate at the Missouri Botanical Gardens under the tutelage of professor Jesse More Greenman.

== Harvard ==
Kobuski was first hired by Harvard University in 1927 as an editor of the Journal of the Arnold Arboretum. He continued in this capacity until 1936 when he became an associate curator of the Arnold Arboretum and the Gray Herbarium. On October 9, 1942, he enlisted in the US Army serving until early 1946, taking a leave of absence from Harvard during this time. In 1954 Kobuski, or "K" as he was known, was hired to be the head curator of both the Arnold Arboretum and Gray Herbarium. Positions he held until his death in 1963. While there Kuboski oversaw the integration of the major herbarium collections of both the Arnold Arboretum and the Gray Herbarium into one single integrated collection of well over 2 million specimens. Through his work while at Harvard he became widely known for his expertise on the flora of Asia, the tropical flora of Central America, as well as the Acanthus Family.

== Death ==
Clarence Kobuski died at his home in Weston, Massachusetts on May 9, 1963.

== Selected publications ==
- 1926. A review of the genus Priva. pg. 34
- 1928. A monograph of the American species of the genus Dyschoriste. Ed. Washington University
- 1937. Studies in Theaceae. II Cleyera. 118 Journal of the Arnold Arboretum, Volume XVIII, pp. 119–123

== Abbreviation ==
In botany, the author abbreviation used to indicate Clarence Emmeren Kobuski as the authority for species' names is Kobuski.
