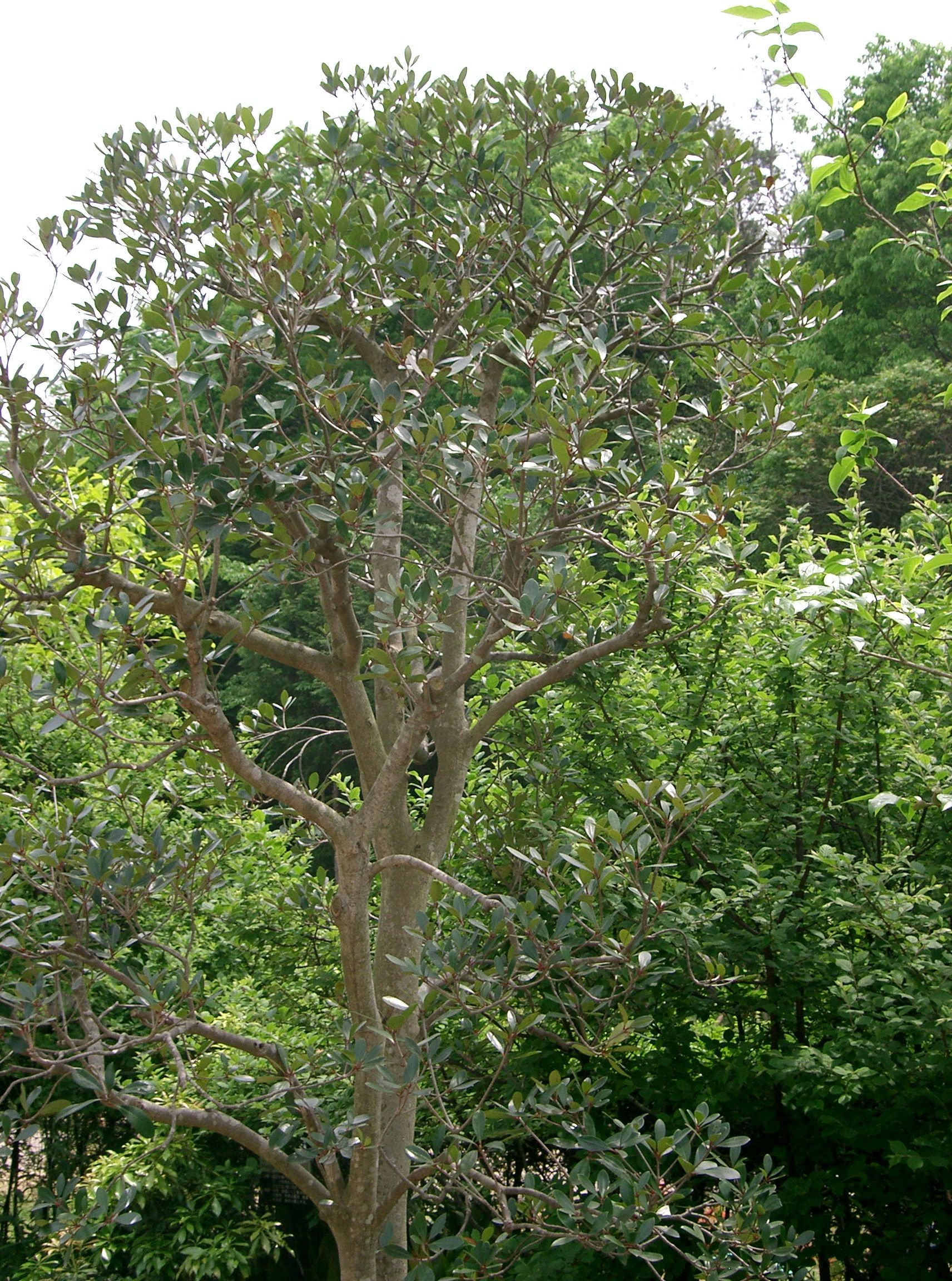
- Ternstroemia gymnanthera

Scientific classification
- Kingdom: Plantae
- Clade: Tracheophytes
- Clade: Angiosperms
- Clade: Eudicots
- Clade: Asterids
- Order: Ericales
- Family: Pentaphylacaceae; Engl.

Genera
- see text

= Pentaphylacaceae =

Taxonomic family of plants

The Pentaphylacaceae are a small family of plants within the order Ericales. In the APG III system of 2009, it includes the former family Ternstroemiaceae.

== Genera ==
In 2014, the Angiosperm Phylogeny Website included 14 genera in the family. Plants of the World Online currently includes 12 genera:

- Adinandra Jack
- Anneslea Wall.
- Archboldiodendron Kobuski
- Balthasaria Verdc.
- Cleyera Thunb.
- Eurya Thunb.
- Euryodendron Hung T.Chang
- Freziera Sw. ex Willd.
- Pentaphylax Gardner & Champ.
- Symplococarpon Airy Shaw
- Ternstroemia Mutis ex L.f.
- Visnea L.f.
