= Mudiao =

Traditional Chinese wood-carving

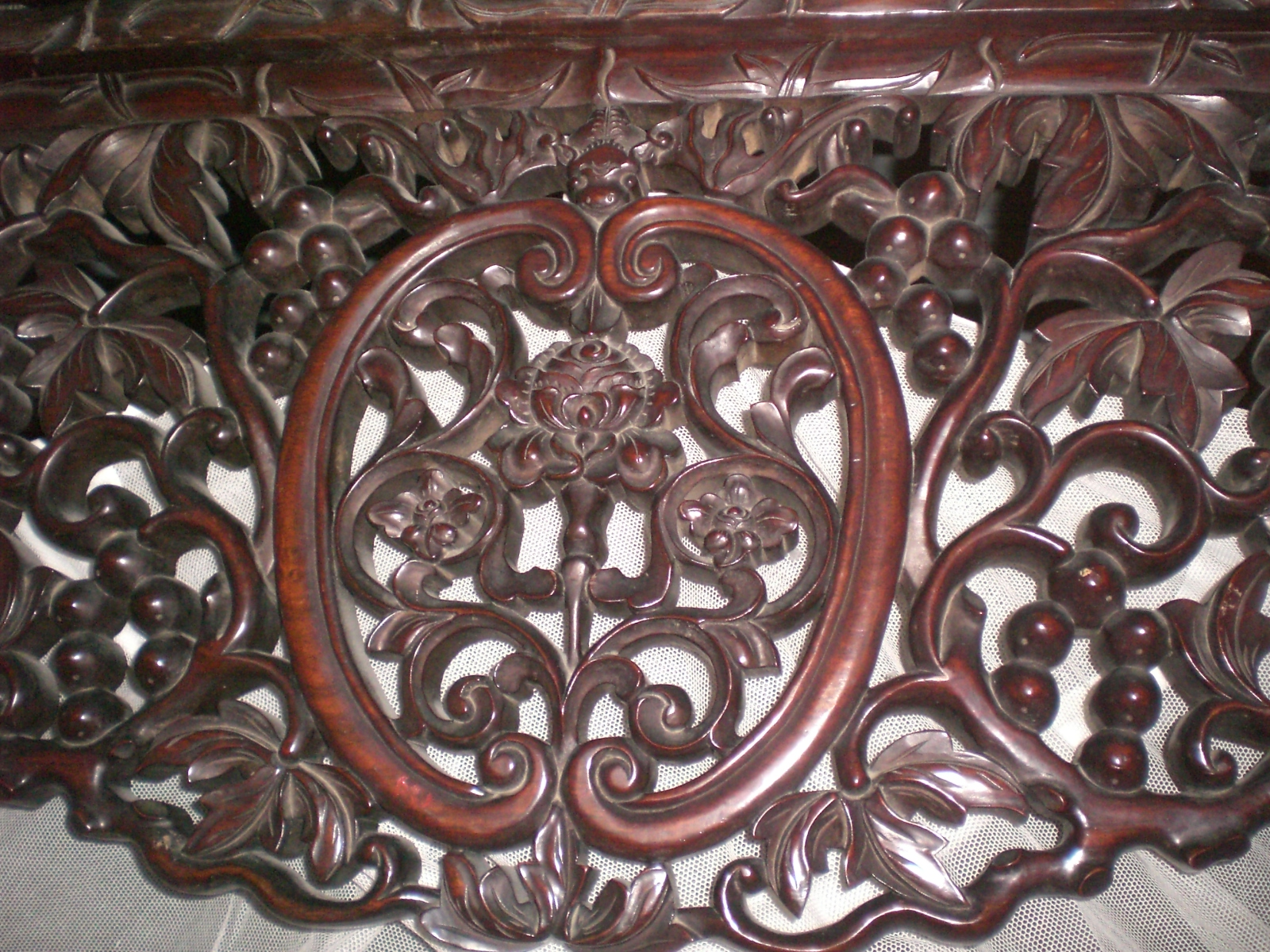
Mudiao fretwork

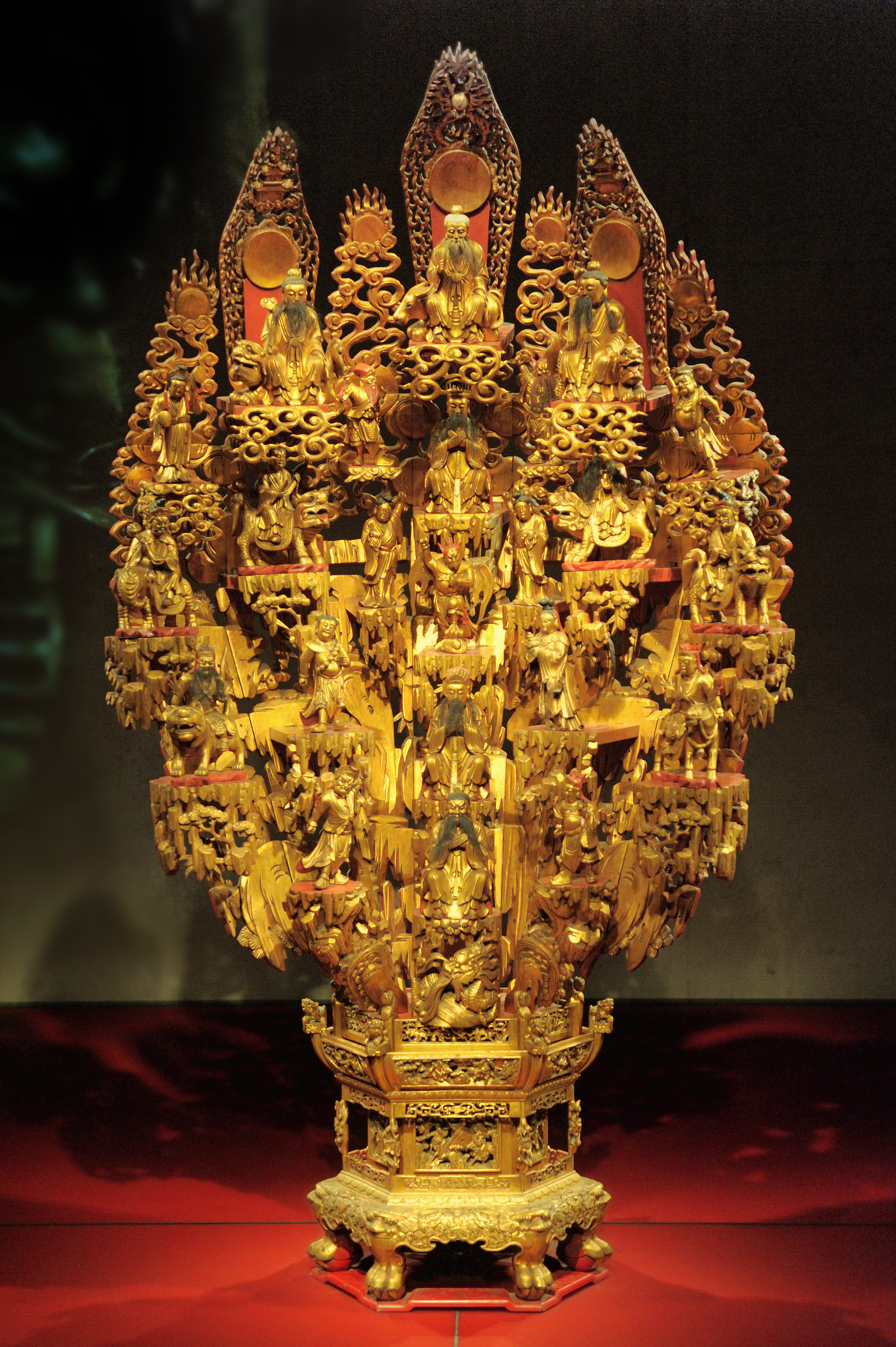
Mudiao sculpture with gold foil

Mudiao is traditional Chinese wood-carving, a form of sculpture, and is still practiced today. Mudiao is characterised by detailed fretwork, and is sometimes covered with gold foil. Mudiao products include chests, furniture, screens and even buildings. Chippendale was strongly influenced by mudiao work.

== Woods used ==
Generally, hardwoods are chosen that are stable and moderately dense, and hence difficult to carve. However, for some carvings aromatic woods such as the tung tree are chosen. Typical woods include:

- Nanmu, durable softwood
- Zitan (Red sandalwood)
- Zhangmu (Camphor tree, Cinnamomum camphora)
- Bomu, various species in the family Cupressaceae, especially the aromatic Glyptostrobus
- Yinxing (Ginkgo biloba)
- Hongmu (Padauk, Redwood or Blackwood), Suan Zhi in Cantonese
- Longan (Dragon Eye)
- Mahogany

== Methodology ==
Classical mudiao is begun by selecting a whole block of wood, sawing it into a regular shape, such as a square flat board, then using edged carving tools to sculpt pictures either in bas-relief or in three-dimensions.

Burls, known as Ying wood or " Yingzi" from a variety of trees are used for carving figurines and standalone sculptures. While coming from any kind of wood, burls from Phoebe trees are the most common. The beautiful lines of bird's-eye knots that look like a string of grapes in Phoebe burls are often called "grape face".

== Places famous for mudiao ==
- Dongyang Township, Zhejiang Province
- Sanyi Township, Taiwan

== See also ==
- Woodcut
- Woodworking
