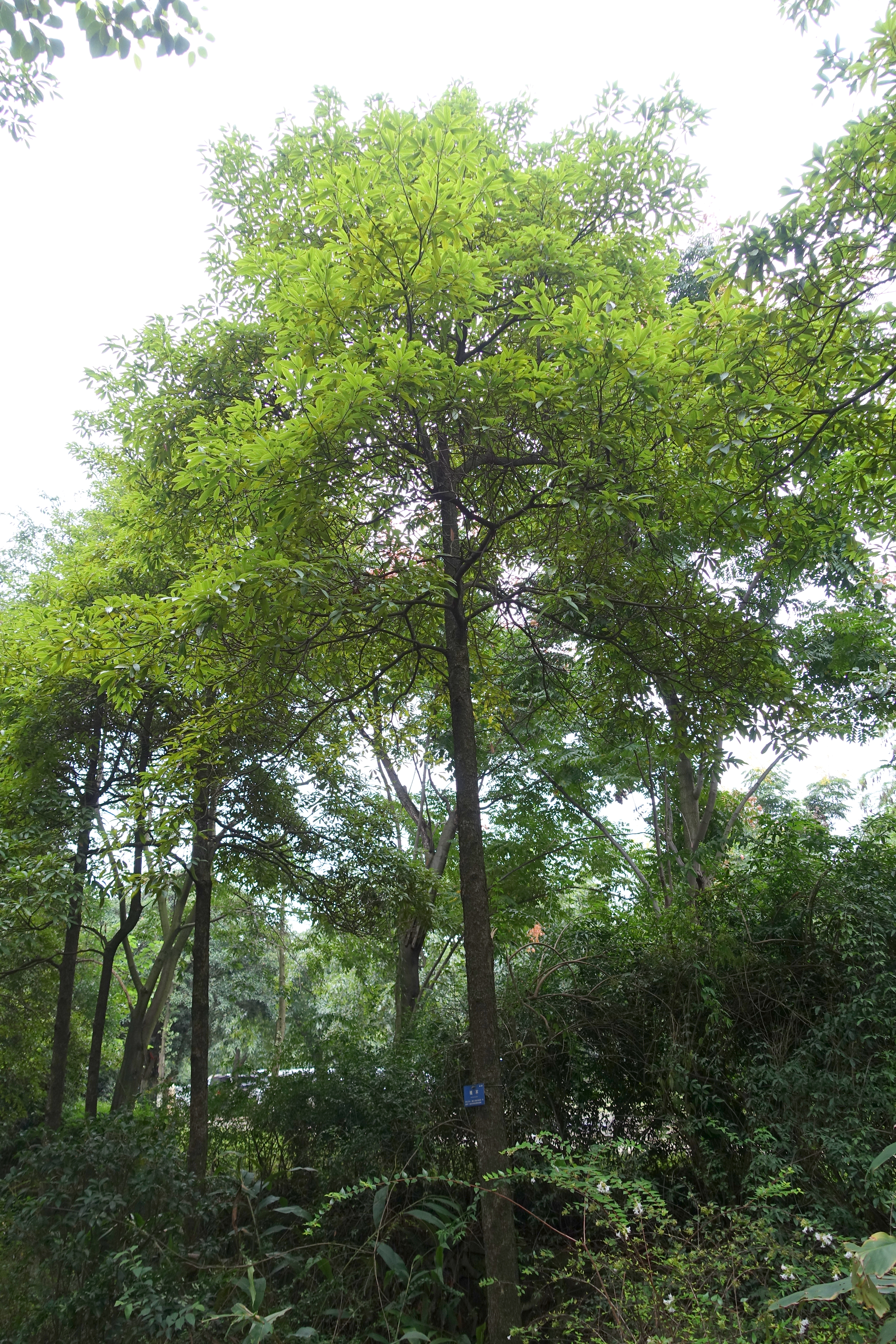

Conservation status
- Vulnerable (IUCN 2.3)

Scientific classification
- Kingdom: Plantae
- Clade: Tracheophytes
- Clade: Angiosperms
- Clade: Magnoliids
- Order: Laurales
- Family: Lauraceae
- Genus: Phoebe
- Species: P. zhennan

Binomial name
- Phoebe zhennan S. Lee & F.N. Wei

= Phoebe zhennan =

Species of tree

Phoebe zhennan is a large species of tree, up to 30 metres (98 ft) tall, in the genus Phoebe of the family Lauraceae. The name "Zhennan" is the transcription of one of the tree's Chinese names, 楨楠/桢楠. It is endemic to China, where it occurs in Guizhou, Hubei, and Sichuan provinces. The species is threatened by habitat loss, and so is under second-class national protection in China. In the past, wood from this tree, referred to as nanmu in China, was so valuable that only royal families could afford their use. Notably, whole logs of Phoebe zhennan wood were used to create pillars for the Forbidden City.

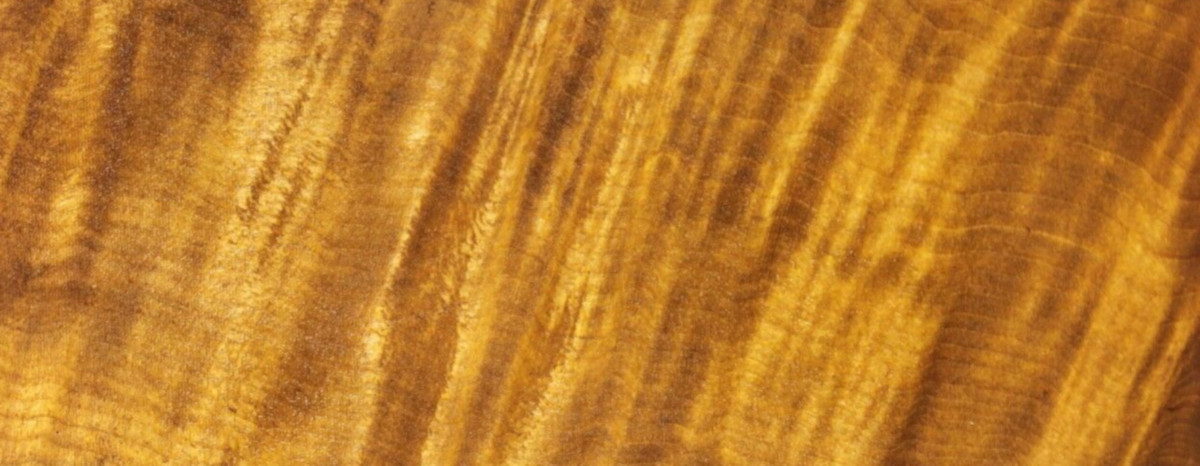
Zhennan wood grain pattern

The wood is particularly valuable when it has become semi-fossilized, and is then referred to as 烏木 Wu Mu, or "Black Wood". The price on the 2012 market could be as high as over $10,000 per cubic meter.
