= Phoebe chekiangensis =

Conservation status
- Vulnerable (IUCN 2.3)

Scientific classification
- Kingdom: Plantae
- Clade: Tracheophytes
- Clade: Angiosperms
- Clade: Magnoliids
- Order: Laurales
- Family: Lauraceae
- Genus: Phoebe
- Species: P. chekiangensis

Binomial name
- Phoebe chekiangensis Shang

Species of tree

Phoebe chekiangensis is a species of tree up to 20 metres (66 ft) in the family Lauraceae. It is endemic to China where it occurs in Fujian, Jiangxi, and Zhejiang provinces. Its name refers to Zhejiang province that is written "Chekiang" in Wade–Giles romanization. It is threatened by habitat loss. It is under second-class national protection in China.
