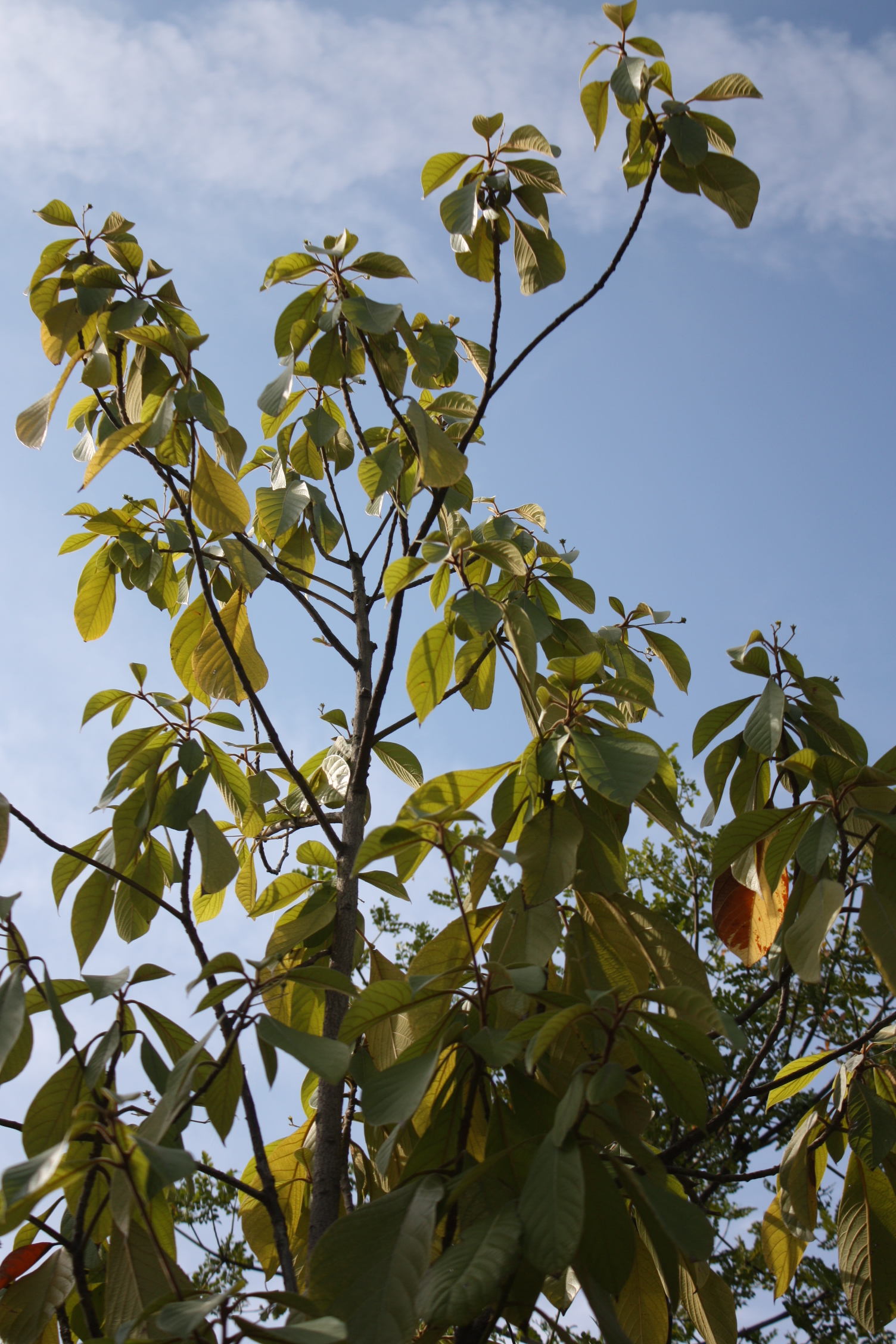

Conservation status
- Least Concern (IUCN 3.1)

Scientific classification
- Kingdom: Plantae
- Clade: Tracheophytes
- Clade: Angiosperms
- Clade: Magnoliids
- Order: Laurales
- Family: Lauraceae
- Genus: Phoebe
- Species: P. formosana

Binomial name
- Phoebe formosana (Hayata) Hayata

Synonyms
- Machilus formosanus Hayata; Phoebe sheareri var. formosana (Hayata) Nakai; Phoebe sheareri var. stenophylla Nakai

= Phoebe formosana =

Species of tree

Phoebe formosana is a species of tree in the family Lauraceae. It is native to Anhui province of southeastern China and Taiwan.
