= Phoebe bournei =

Conservation status
- Near Threatened (IUCN 2.3)

Scientific classification
- Kingdom: Plantae
- Clade: Tracheophytes
- Clade: Angiosperms
- Clade: Magnoliids
- Order: Laurales
- Family: Lauraceae
- Genus: Phoebe
- Species: P. bournei

Binomial name
- Phoebe bournei (Hemsl.) Yen C.Yang

Synonyms
- Machilus bournei Hemsl.; Persea bournei (Hemsl.) Kosterm.; Phoebe acuminata Merr.; Phoebe blepharopus Hand.-Mazz.

Species of tree

Phoebe bournei is a species of tree up to 20 metres (66 ft) tall in the family Lauraceae. It is endemic to China, where it occurs in Fujian, Guangdong, Guangxi, Guizhou, Hainan, Hubei, and Jiangxi provinces. It is threatened by habitat loss. The species is under second-class national protection in China.
