= Nanmu =

Type of wood used in China

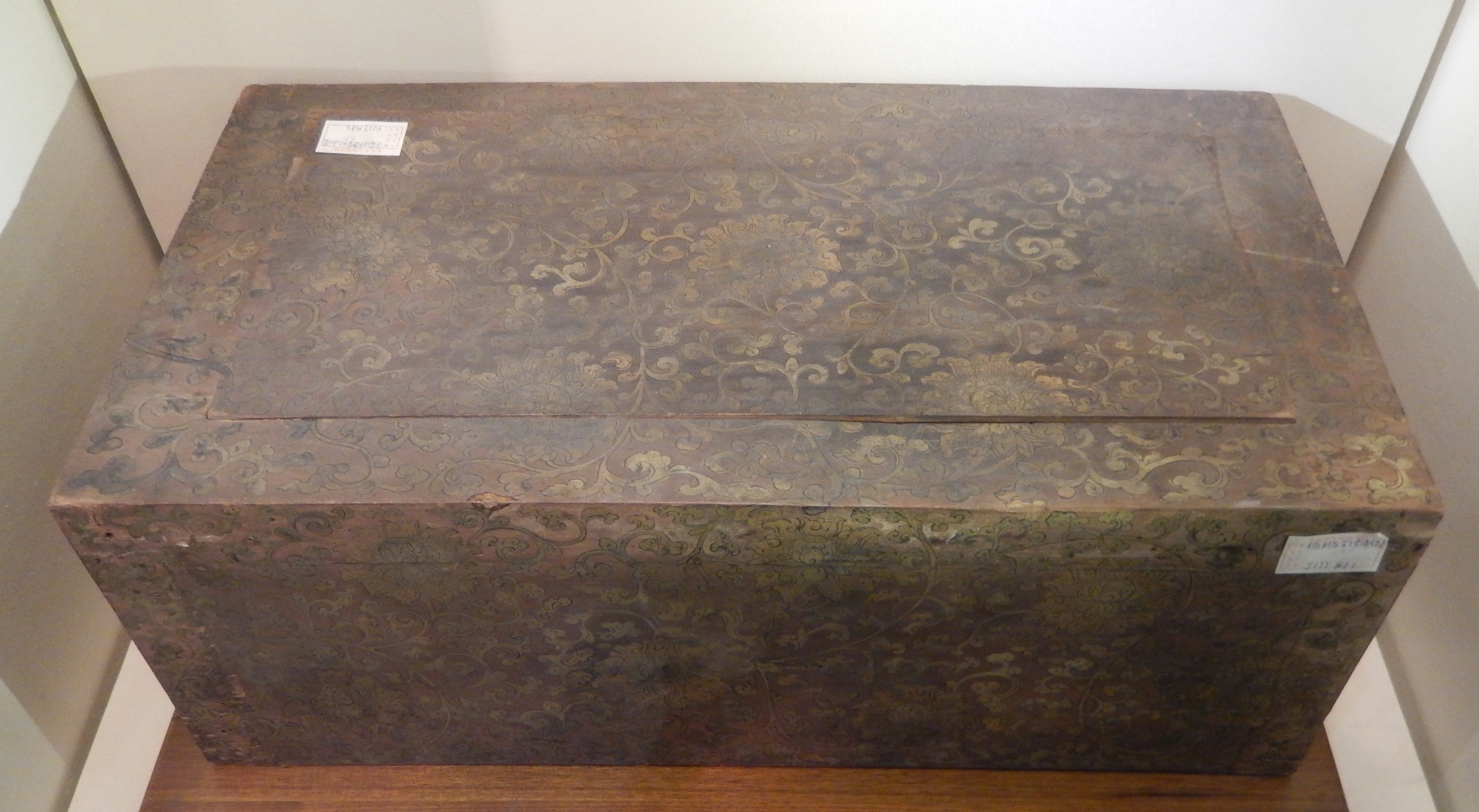
Buddhist scripture box made of Nanmu wood. Found in the white pagoda of Miaoying Temple during renovations in autumn 1978, dates from Qing dynasty (1644–1911)

Nanmu (Chinese: 楠木) is a precious wood that is found in China and South Asia, and was historically used for boat building, architectural woodworking, furniture and sculptural carving in China. The Ming dynasty-era writings indicate this wood as superior durable softwood. A recent excavation of a tomb in Lija village in Jing'an County, Jiangxi Province, found 47 coffins made of nanmu wood that are reported to be about 2500 years old, dating back to the Eastern Zhou dynasty period and belonging to the Dongyi State of Xu.

The trees that produce nanmu wood are evergreens that have long, straight trunks which grows to 35 meters in height and one meter in diameter. More than 30 varieties exist, which are found south of the Yangtze River. There are also nanmu trees on Hainan Island and in Vietnam. Yangmu nanmu is found in Sichuan. Zinan nanmu is found in southeast and south central China. Zinanmu nanmu is found in Jiangsu, Anhui, Zhenjiang. Zhennan nanmu is found in Guizhou and Sichuan. The finest of all the nanmu woods is Hongmao Nanmu (Phoebe hungmaoensis) from Hainan Island.

Nanmu wood comes from several species of tree, including:

- Litsea cubeba
- Machilus nanmu
- Phoebe hungmaoensis
- Phoebe zhennan

It is trees of the genus Phoebe, however, that produce the highest grades of nanmu wood.

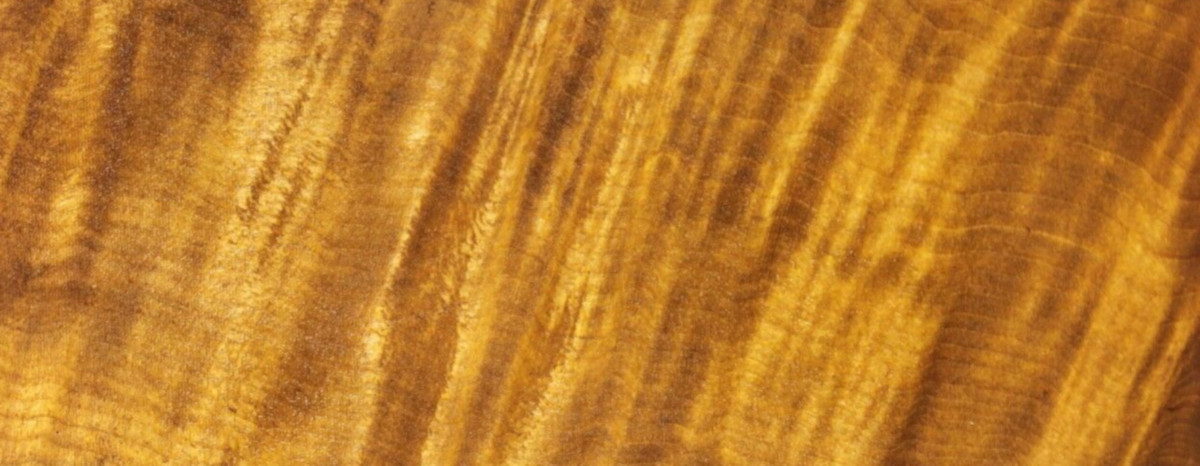
Nanmu wood (Phoebe zhennan) grain pattern

Nanmu is a knotty wood that frequently shows a wavy or quilted grain figure. It does not react to humidity and temperature much in the way of expansion or contraction and makes superior furniture which tends not to get loose or crack because of changes in climate. Nanmu woods that are lighter in color and have loose grain are considered inferior.

Nanmu was used in architectural woodworking and boatbuilding due to its resistance to decay. The wood dries with little splitting or warping. After drying the wood is of medium-density and does not change shape. Nanmu can be sanded to a mirror finish. The highest grade of nanmu wood has a bright golden color, a pleasant fragrance, and exhibits impressive chatoyancy (an optical effect) which is why it is often referred to as jīnsī (Chinese: 金絲 - golden-thread or golden silk) in China.

Although recently harvested nanmu and zhennan lumber and newly made articles could still be obtained (at extremely high prices) as recently as 2019, it is officially a protected species in China and worldwide. Due to deforestation, disease, and pollution, these species are almost exhausted. Some small semi-natural forest stands and protected artificial forests still exist, but the trees are otherwise now limited to small growths of aging decorative trees in temples, cottages, parks, and courtyards.
