= Phoebe javanica =

Conservation status
- Data Deficient (IUCN 3.1)

Scientific classification
- Kingdom: Plantae
- Clade: Tracheophytes
- Clade: Angiosperms
- Clade: Magnoliids
- Order: Laurales
- Family: Lauraceae
- Genus: Phoebe
- Species: P. javanica

Binomial name
- Phoebe javanica Meisn.

Synonyms
- Phoebe opaca Zoll.

Species of tree

Phoebe javanica is a species of plant in the family Lauraceae. It is a tree endemic to Java in Indonesia. It is threatened by habitat loss.
