= Phoebe macrocarpa =

Conservation status
- Vulnerable (IUCN 3.1)

Scientific classification
- Kingdom: Plantae
- Clade: Tracheophytes
- Clade: Angiosperms
- Clade: Magnoliids
- Order: Laurales
- Family: Lauraceae
- Genus: Phoebe
- Species: P. macrocarpa

Binomial name
- Phoebe macrocarpa C.Y.Wu

Synonyms
- Phoebe poilanei Kosterm.

Species of flowering plant

Phoebe macrocarpa is a species of flowering plant in the family Lauraceae. It is a tree native to southeastern Yunnan in south-central China and to northern Vietnam.

The species was described by Wu Zhengyi in 1957.
