= Phoebe scortechinii =

Conservation status
- Near Threatened (IUCN 3.1)

Scientific classification
- Kingdom: Plantae
- Clade: Embryophytes
- Clade: Tracheophytes
- Clade: Angiosperms
- Clade: Magnoliids
- Order: Laurales
- Family: Lauraceae
- Genus: Phoebe
- Species: P. scortechinii

Binomial name
- Phoebe scortechinii (Gamble) Kochummen ex de Kok

Synonyms
- Machilus scortechinii Gamble; Persea scortechinii (Gamble) Kosterm.

Species of tree

Phoebe scortechinii is a species of plant in the family Lauraceae. It is a tree endemic to Peninsular Malaysia.
