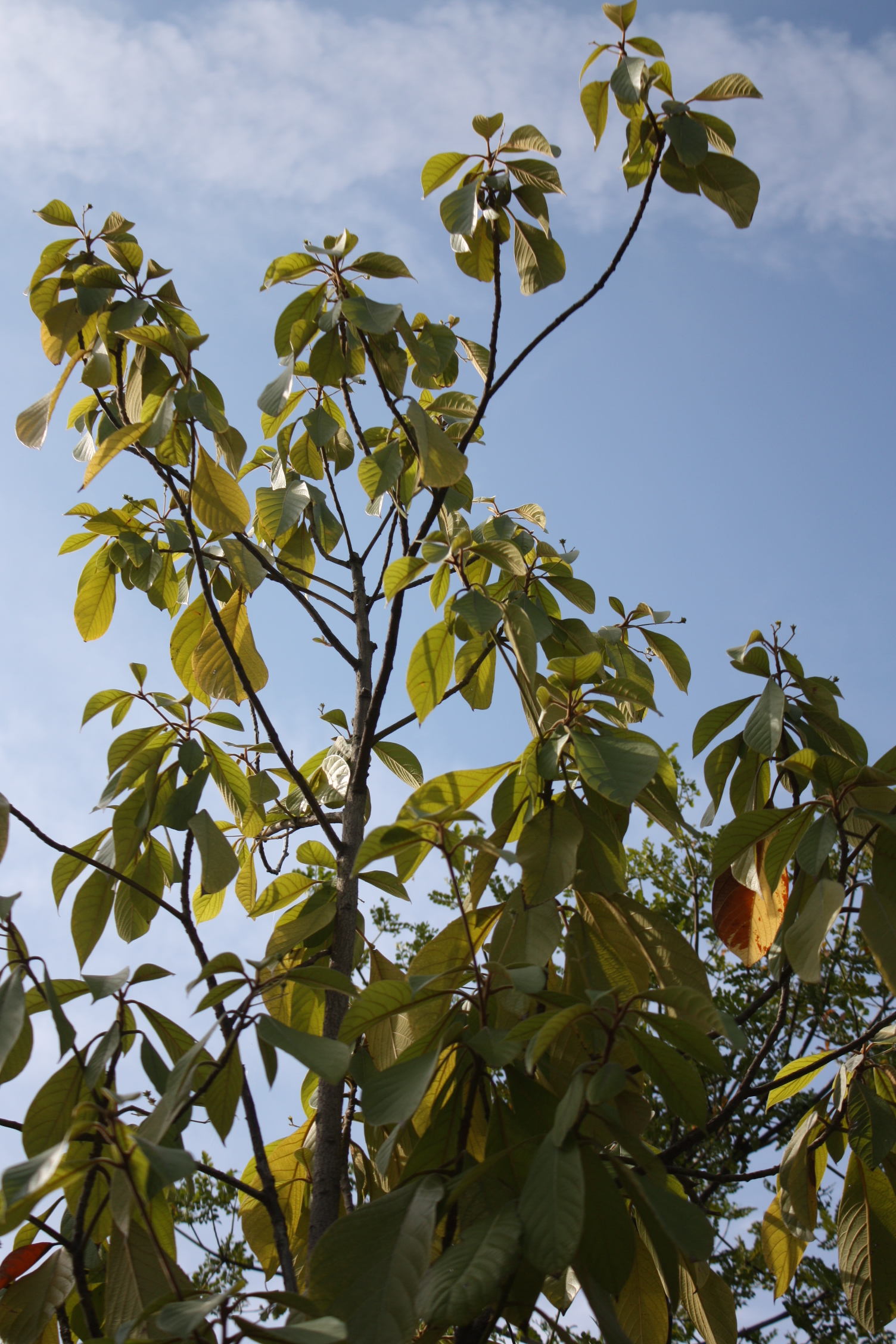
- Phoebe formosana

Scientific classification
- Kingdom: Plantae
- Clade: Tracheophytes
- Clade: Angiosperms
- Clade: Magnoliids
- Order: Laurales
- Family: Lauraceae
- Genus: Phoebe; Nees

Species
- See text

= Phoebe (plant) =

Genus of flowering plants

Phoebe is a genus of evergreen trees and shrubs belonging to the Laurel family, Lauraceae. There are 75 accepted species in the genus, distributed in tropical and subtropical Asia and New Guinea. 35 species occur in China, of which 27 are endemic. The first description of the genus was of the type species P. lanceolata made in 1836 by Christian Gottfried Daniel Nees von Esenbeck in Systema Laurinarum, p. 98.

== Description ==
Phoebe species are evergreen shrubs or trees with pinnately veined leaves. The flowers are hermaphrodite, white, small and fragrant, and are grouped in branched terminal inflorescences in the form of panicles. The bracts are all of equal length or the outer ones are slightly shorter than the inner ones. The ovary is oval to spherical. The stigma is capitate or bowl-shaped. The fruits are enveloped by the enlarged bracts. Fruits are usually oval to spherical. The fruit is a berry and has only a single seed that is frequently dispersed by birds.

== Distribution ==
Up to 100 species of Phoebe are currently reported in Asia, with 27 species endemic to China.

== Ecology ==
The fruits of the genus are fleshy berries.

== Species ==
75 species are currently accepted:

- Phoebe angustifolia Meisn. – Indochina, Assam, and China (southeastern Yunnan)
- Phoebe assamica Kalyankumar – northeastern India
- Phoebe attenuata (Nees) Nees – Eastern Himalayas, northeastern India, Bangladesh, Myanmar, and Vietnam
- Phoebe baishyae M.Gangop. - Arunachal Pradesh in India
- Phoebe birmanica Kosterm. – Myanmar
- Phoebe bootanica (Meisn.) M.Gangop., synonym of Phoebe hainesiana – central and eastern Himalayas and northeastern India
- Phoebe bournei (Hemsl.) Y.C.Yang - southern China and Hainan
- Phoebe brachythyrsa H.W.Li – northeastern Yunnan in China
- Phoebe calcarea S.Lee & F.N.Wei – Guangxi and southern Guizhou in China
- Phoebe canescens (Blume) Miq. – Borneo, Peninsular Malaysia, and Sumatra
- Phoebe cathia (D.Don) Kosterm. – southwestern and northeastern India, eastern Himalayas, Bangladesh, Myanmar, Laos, and Vietnam
- Phoebe cavaleriei (H.Lév.) Y.Yang & Bing Liu – Sichuan, northeastern Yunnan, and Guizhou in China
- Phoebe chartacea (Blume) Miq. – Java
- Phoebe chekiangensis C.B.Shang – China (eastern Jiangxi, northern Fujian, and northern Zhejiang)
- Phoebe clemensii C.K.Allen – New Guinea
- Phoebe cooperiana P.C.Kanjilal & Das – northeastern India
- Phoebe crassipedicella S.Lee & F.N.Wei – China (southern Guizhou and northwestern Guangxi)
- Phoebe cuneata (Blume) Blume – Cambodia, Laos, Vietnam, Borneo, Sumatra, Java, Sulawesi
- Phoebe cuspidata Blume – Java
- Phoebe dehaasiifolia Kosterm. – Thailand
- Phoebe elliptica Blume – Peninsular Malaysia, Java
- Phoebe excelsa (Blume) Nees – Java
- Phoebe faberi (Hemsl.) Chun – central China
- Phoebe forbesii Gamble – New Guinea
- Phoebe formosana (Hayata) Hayata – Taiwan and Anhui
- Phoebe gamblei Kamik. – Java
- Phoebe glabrifolia Merr. – Philippines
- Phoebe glaucifolia S.K.Lee & F.N.Wei – southeastern Tibet and central Yunnan
- Phoebe glaucophylla H.W.Li – southeastern Yunnan
- Phoebe grandis (Nees) Merr. – Indochina, Peninsular Malaysia, Borneo, Sumatra, Java, and Sulawesi
- Phoebe hainanensis Merr. – Hainan
- Phoebe hedgei M.Gangop. & A.Sarmah – Arunachal Pradesh
- Phoebe hekouensis Bing Liu, W.Y.Jin, L.N.Zhao & Y.Yang – Yunnan
- Phoebe holosericea Blume – Sumatra
- Phoebe hui W.C.Cheng ex Y.C.Yang – China (Sichuan, northeastern Yunnan, and southern Shaanxi)
- Phoebe hunanensis Hand.-Mazz. – central and southern China
- Phoebe hungmaoensis S.K.Lee – China (Hainan and southwestern and southern Guangxi), Vietnam
- Phoebe javanica Meisn. – Java
- Phoebe kjellbergii Kosterm. – Sulawesi
- Phoebe kunstleri Gamble – Vietnam, Laos, Borneo
- Phoebe kwangsiensis H.Liu – China (southwestern Guizhou and northwestern Guangxi)
- Phoebe laevis Kosterm. – Borneo
- Phoebe lanceolata (Nees) Nees – India, Bangladesh, eastern Himalaya, Indochina, Peninsular Malaysia, China (southern Yunnan)
- Phoebe legendrei Lecomte – China (western and southeastern Sichuan and northwestern Yunnan)
- Phoebe leiophylla Miq. – Borneo and Sulawesi
- Phoebe liana Y.Yang – China (Guizhou)
- Phoebe lichuanensis S.K.Lee – China (southwestern Hubei)
- Phoebe longepetiolata Kosterm. – Sumatra
- Phoebe lucida Blume – Sumatra and Borneo
- Phoebe lummaoensis M.Gangop. – Myanmar
- Phoebe macrocarpa C.Y.Wu, synonym of Phoebe poilanei – China (southeastern Yunnan) and northern Vietnam
- Phoebe macrophylla Blume – Vietnam, Borneo, Sumatra, Java, Maluku, New Guinea
- Phoebe megacalyx H.W.Li – China (southeastern Yunnan) to northern Vietnam
- Phoebe motuonan S.K.Lee & F.N.Wei – southeastern Tibet
- Phoebe neurantha (Hemsl.) Gamble – central and southern China
- Phoebe neuranthoides S.K.Lee & F.N.Wei – central and southern China
- Phoebe nigrifolia S.K.Lee & F.N.Wei – China (southwestern Guangxi)
- Phoebe obtusa Blume ex Meisn. – Java
- Phoebe pallida (Nees) Nees – western and central Himalaya, Northeastern India, Bangladesh, Myanmar, Vietnam
- Phoebe petelotii Kosterm. ex H.H.Pham – Vietnam
- Phoebe pierrei Lecomte – Cambodia
- Phoebe prazeri M.Gangop. – Myanmar
- Phoebe puwenensis W.C.Cheng – China (southern Yunnan)
- Phoebe rufescens H.W.Li – China (southwestern Yunnan)
- Phoebe scortechinii (Gamble) Kochummen ex de Kok – Peninsular Malaysia
- Phoebe sheareri (Hemsl.) Gamble – southern China and Vietnam
- Phoebe siamensis Kosterm. – Thailand
- Phoebe sterculioides (Elmer) Merr. – Philippines
- Phoebe tavoyana Hook.f. – China (Yunnan, southeastern Guangxi, and Guangdong), Indochina, and Peninsular Malaysia
- Phoebe tenuifolia Kosterm. – Philippines and Sulawesi
- Phoebe wightii Meisn. – southwestern India
- Phoebe yaiensis S.K.Lee – China (southwestern Guangxi and Hainan) and Vietnam
- Phoebe yunnanensis H.W.Li – China (western Yunnan)
- Phoebe zhennan S.K.Lee & F.N.Wei – China (Sichuan, western Hubei, and northwestern Guizhou)

=== Formerly placed here ===
- Phoebe nanmu (Oliver) Gamble, synonym of Machilus nanmu

=== Phylogeny ===
After

- - - - clade I
        - - - - - - - Mac. robusta
                    - Mac. sp. W14071
                    - Mac. sp. W14068
                  - Pho. minutiflora
                - Mac. japonica
                - Mac. decursinervis
              - - - Mac. grijsii
                  - Mac. platycarpa
                - Mac. yunnanensis
            - - - - Mac. kwangtungensis
                  - Mac. oculodracontis
                  - Mac. duthiei
                  - Mac. gamblei
                - - Mac. oreophila
                  - Mac. leptophylla
              - Pho. faberi
            - - - Mac. salicoides
                - Mac. pomifera
              - - Mac. salicina
                - Mac. thunbergii
              - Mac. breviflora
            - - - Mac. pingii
                - Mac. shweliensis
              - - Mac gongshanensis
                - Mac. phoenicis
              - Mac. monticola
          - Deh. caesia
        - - - - - - - Deh. hainanensis
                    - Als. sp. W17084
                  - Deh. sp. L20070187
                - Als. semecarpifolia
              - Als. huanglianshanensis
            - - Als. gigaphylla
              - Not. umbelliflora
          - - Deh. sp. A34
            - Deh. incrassata
      - clade II
        - Persea clade I
          - - - - - - - Per. aurata
                      - Per. splendens
                    - - Per. major
                      - Per. weberbaueri
                  - - Per. sp. V25232
                    - Per. sp. W19517
                - Per. alba
              - - - Per. sp. W14875
                  - Per. sp. B21834
                  - Per. lingue
                - Per. caerulea
            - - - - Per. borbonia
                  - Per. haenkeana
                - Per. palustris
              - Per. indica
          - Per. areolatocostae
        - Persea clade II
          - - Per. americana
            - Per. styermarkii
          - Apo. barbujana
    - clade III
      - - - Phoebe clade I
            - - - - - - Pho. formosana
                      - Pho. chekiangensis
                    - Pho. nanmu
                  - Pho. neurantha
                - Pho. lanceolata
              - - Pho. sp. L20070260
                - Pho. zhennan
            - Pho. macrocarpa
            - Pho. angustifolia
          - Phoebe clade II
            - - - Pho. cuneata
                - Pho. elliptica
              - Pho. sp. A49
            - - - Pho. puwenensis
                - Pho. hungmaoensis
              - Pho. megacalyx
        - Per. nudigemma
      - - - - Als. rugosa
            - Als. hainanensis
          - Als. sp. W14264
        - - Per. sphaerocarpa
          - Per. sp. W21874
      - - Als. petiolaris
        - Als. andersonii
  - - - - - - Neo. sericea
            - Neo. howii
          - Neo. cambodiana
        - - Act. cupularis
          - Act. trichocarpa
      - Lit. verticillata
    - - Lin. megaphylla
      - Lit. auriculata
      - Lin. erythrocarpa

== Fossil record ==
Several fossil cupules, some with fruits inside of †Phoebe bohemica from the early Miocene, have been found at the Kristina Mine at Hrádek nad Nisou in North Bohemia, the Czech Republic.
