= Machilus nanmu =

Conservation status
- Endangered (IUCN 2.3)

Scientific classification
- Kingdom: Plantae
- Clade: Tracheophytes
- Clade: Angiosperms
- Clade: Magnoliids
- Order: Laurales
- Family: Lauraceae
- Genus: Machilus
- Species: M. nanmu

Binomial name
- Machilus nanmu (Oliv.) Hemsl.

Synonyms
- Machilus pingii W.C.Cheng ex Y.C.Yang; Persea nanmu Oliv.; Persea pingii (W.C.Cheng ex Y.C.Yang) Kosterm.; Phoebe nanmu Oliv.) Gamble

Species of tree

Machilus nanmu is a species of evergreen tree in the family Lauraceae. It is endemic to Sichuan and northeastern Yunnan provinces in southern China. M. nanmu is threatened by habitat loss due primarily to overcutting.

Machilus nanmu is a large, slow growing tree that develops with a long straight trunk ranging from 10 to 40 meters in height, and 50 to 100 cm in diameter. Its nanmu wood was used extensively in construction and furniture making because it is highly resistant to decay, is very dense and comes in attractive colours from olive-brown to reddish brown. The Forbidden City was originally constructed using M. nanmu wood by Ming emperor Zhu Di. Because it is resistant to decay it was also used to make boats.
