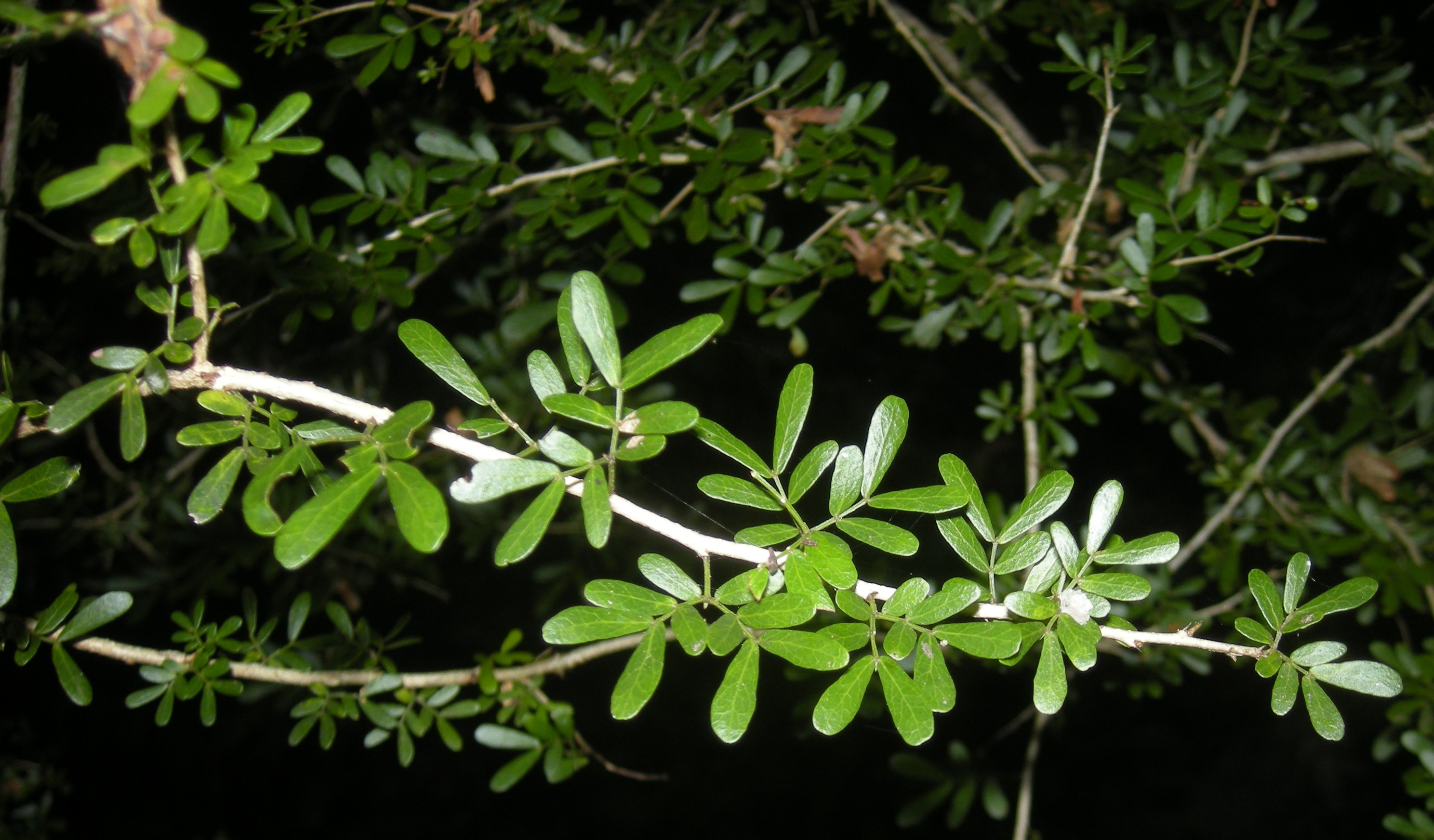
- Heliodendron thozetianum foliage

Scientific classification
- Kingdom: Plantae
- Clade: Tracheophytes
- Clade: Angiosperms
- Clade: Eudicots
- Clade: Rosids
- Order: Fabales
- Family: Fabaceae
- Genus: Heliodendron; Gill.K.Br. & Bayly (2022)

Type species
- Heliodendron basalticum (F. Muell.) Gill.K.Br. & Bayly

Species
- Heliodendron basalticum (F.Muell.) Gill.K.Br. & Bayly; Heliodendron thozetianum (F.Muell.) Gill.K.Br. & Bayly; Heliodendron xanthoxylon (C.T.White & W.D.Francis) Gill.K.Br. & Bayly

= Heliodendron =

Genus of flowering plants

Heliodendron is a genus of flowering plants in the family Fabaceae. It includes three species native to Queensland.

The genus was described in 2022. The three species were previously classed in genus Archidendropsis.

== Species ==
- Heliodendron basalticum (F.Muell.) Gill.K.Br. & Bayly
- Heliodendron thozetianum (F.Muell.) Gill.K.Br. & Bayly
- Heliodendron xanthoxylon (C.T.White & W.D.Francis) Gill.K.Br. & Bayly
