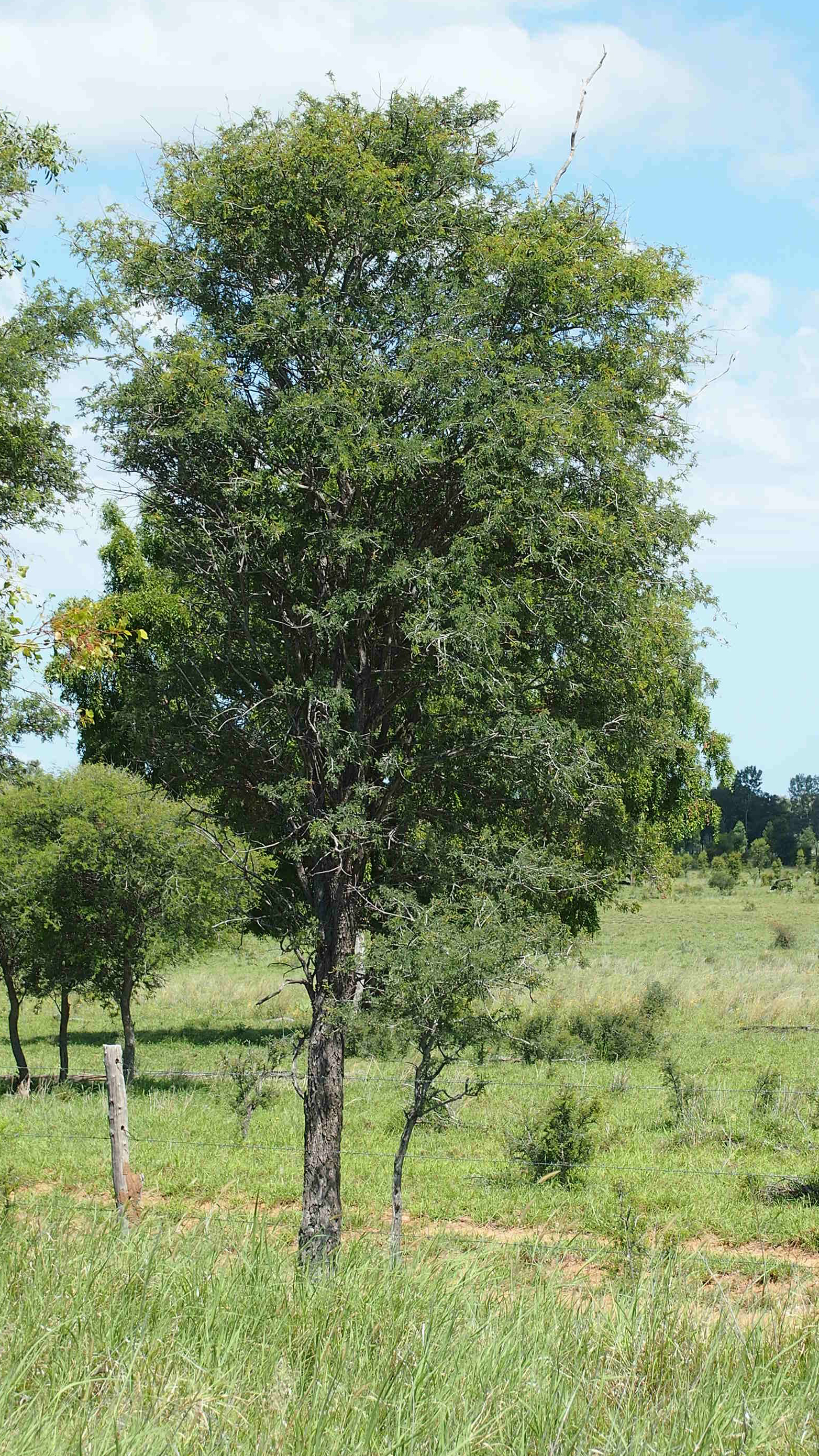

Scientific classification
- Kingdom: Plantae
- Clade: Embryophytes
- Clade: Tracheophytes
- Clade: Spermatophytes
- Clade: Angiosperms
- Clade: Eudicots
- Clade: Rosids
- Order: Fabales
- Family: Fabaceae
- Genus: Heliodendron
- Species: H. basalticum

Binomial name
- Heliodendron basalticum (F.Muell.) Gill.K.Br. & Bayly (2022)

Synonyms
- Acacia basaltica F.Muell. (1863); Albizia basaltica (F.Muell.) Benth. (1864); Archidendropsis basalticum (F.Muell.) I.C.Nielsen (1983); Feuilleea basaltica (F.Muell.) Kuntze (1891)

= Heliodendron basalticum =

Species of legume

Heliodendron basalticum is a species of tree native to the dry rainforests of Queensland, Australia.

It was first described in 1859 as Acacia basaltica by Ferdinand von Mueller. In 1883 George Bentham transferred it to the genus, Albizia. In 1983 Ivan Nielsen and others transferred it to the genus, Archidendropsis. In 2022 Gillian Brown and others assigned it to the new genus, Heliodendron.
