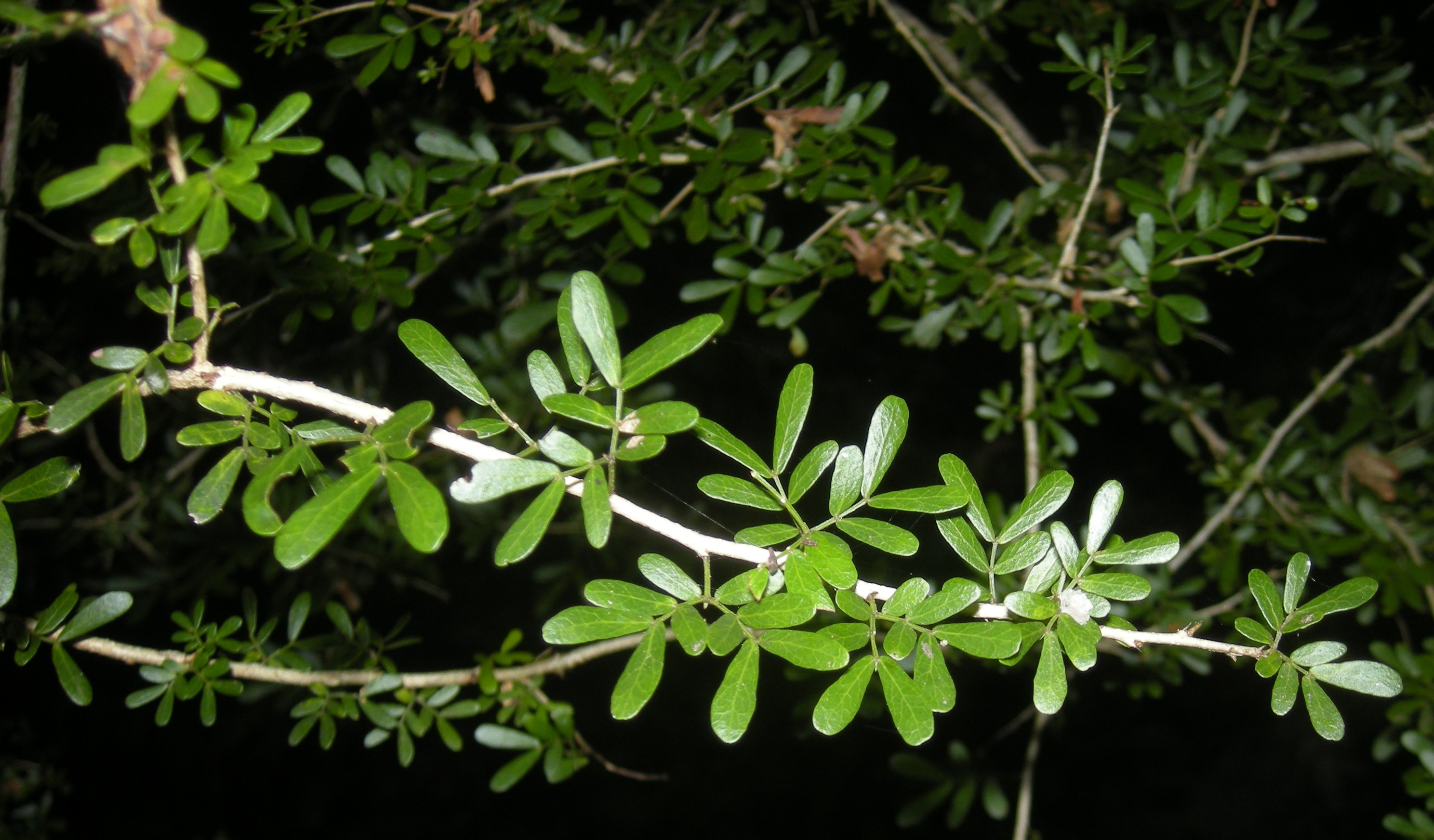
- Archidendropsis thozetiana

Scientific classification
- Kingdom: Plantae
- Clade: Tracheophytes
- Clade: Angiosperms
- Clade: Eudicots
- Clade: Rosids
- Order: Fabales
- Family: Fabaceae
- Subfamily: Caesalpinioideae
- Clade: Mimosoid clade
- Genus: Archidendropsis; I.C.Nielsen (1983)

Species
- See text

= Archidendropsis =

Genus of legumes

Archidendropsis is a genus of flowering plants in the family Fabaceae. It includes 11 species, which are native to Australia, New Guinea, the Bismarck Archipelago, Solomon Islands, and New Caledonia.

== Species ==
11 species are currently accepted:

- Archidendropsis fournieri (Vieill.) I.C.Nielsen
- Archidendropsis fulgens (Labill.) I.C.Nielsen
- Archidendropsis glandulosa (Guillaumin) I.C.Nielsen
- Archidendropsis granulosa (Labill.) I.C.Nielsen
- Archidendropsis lentiscifolia (Benth.) I.C.Nielsen
- Archidendropsis macradenia (Harms) I.C.Nielsen
- Archidendropsis oblonga (Hemsl.) I.C.Nielsen
- Archidendropsis paivana (E.Fourn.) I.C.Nielsen
- Archidendropsis sepikensis (Verdc.) I.C.Nielsen
- Archidendropsis spicata (Verdc.) I.C.Nielsen
- Archidendropsis streptocarpa (E.Fourn.) I.C.Nielsen

=== Formerly placed here ===
- Heliodendron basalticum (as Archidendropsis basaltica)
- Heliodendron thozetianum (as Archidendropsis thozetiana)
- Heliodendron xanthoxylon (as Archidendropsis xanthoxylon)
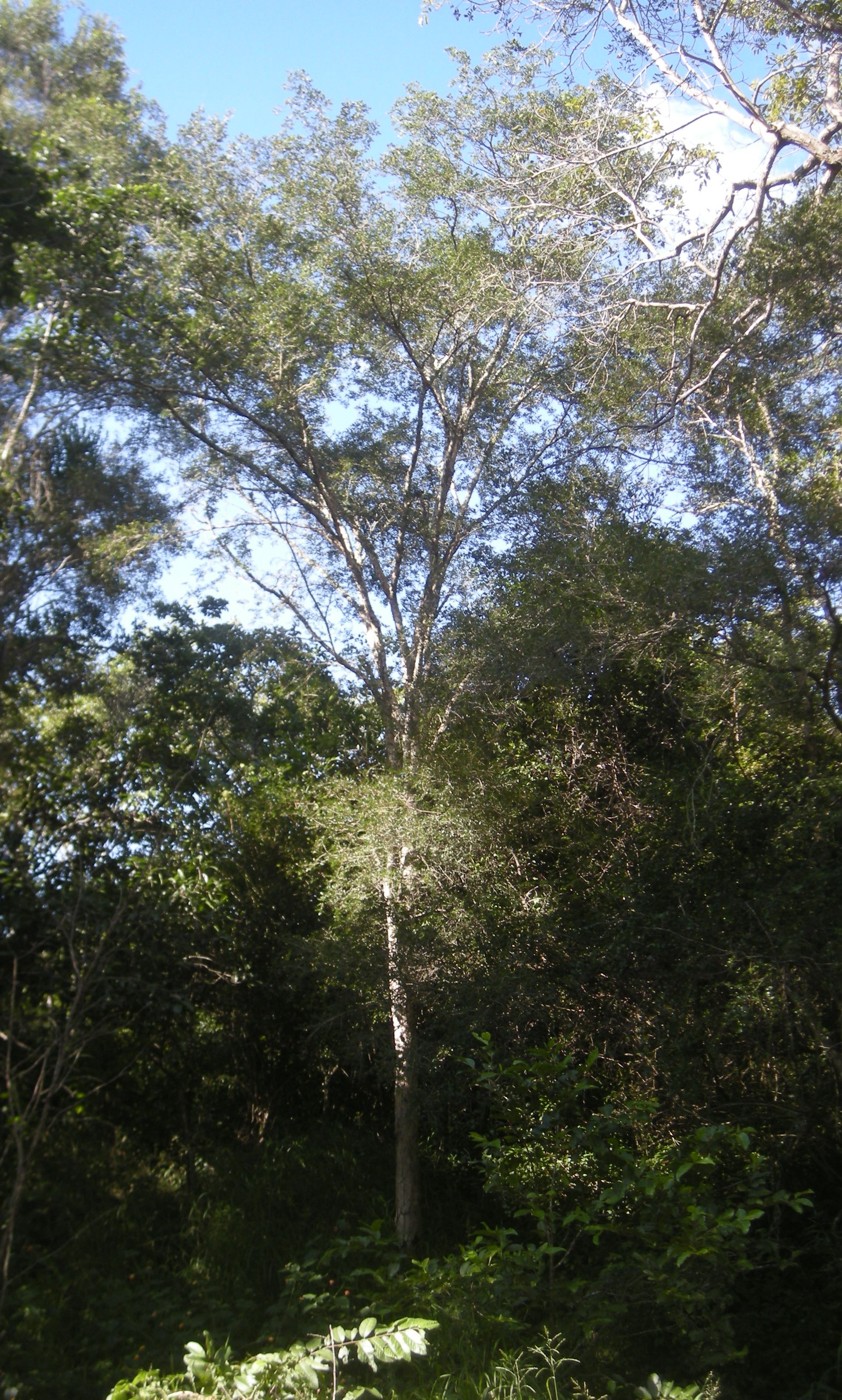
Archidendropsis thozetiana tree

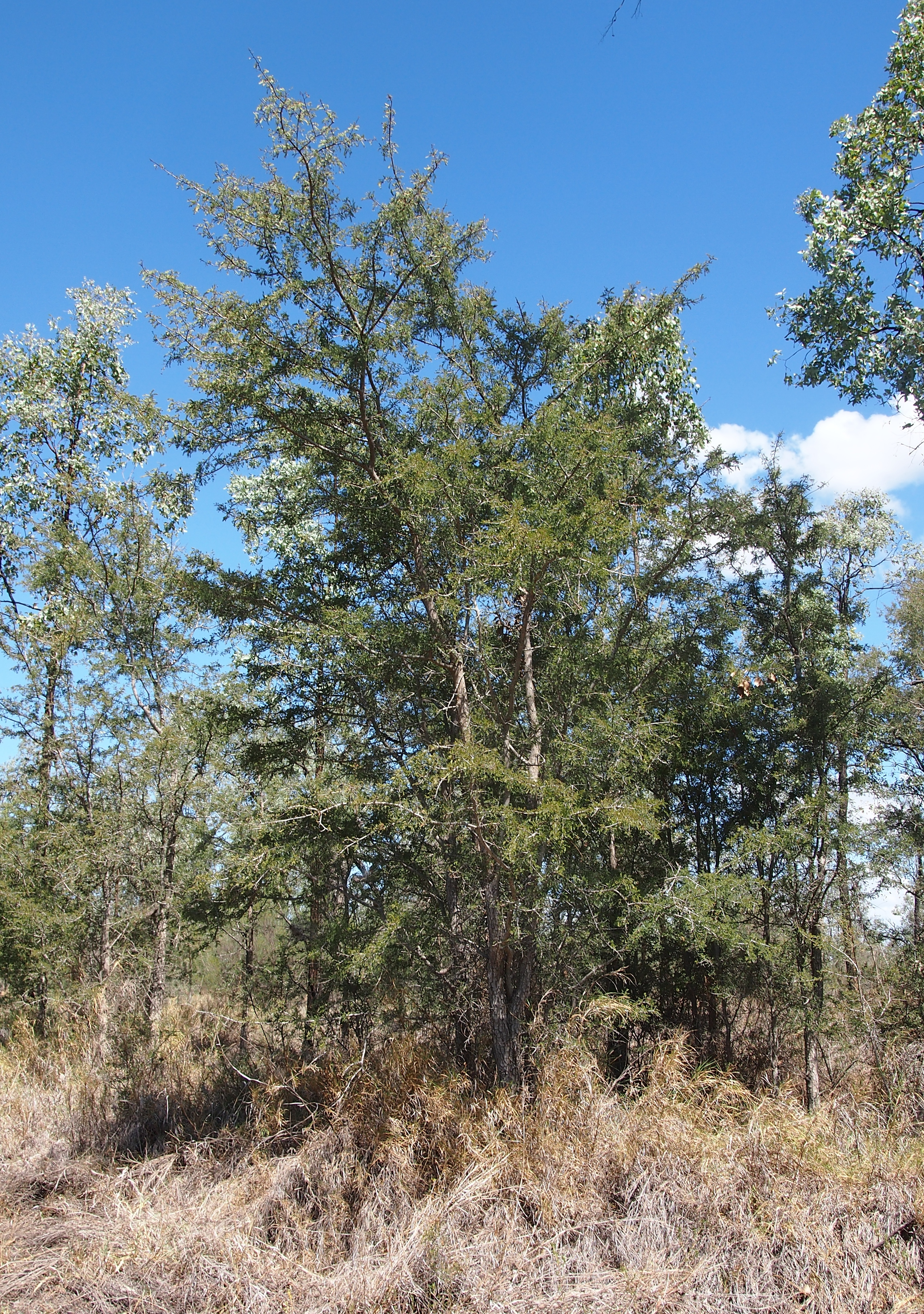
Archidendropsis basaltica habit
