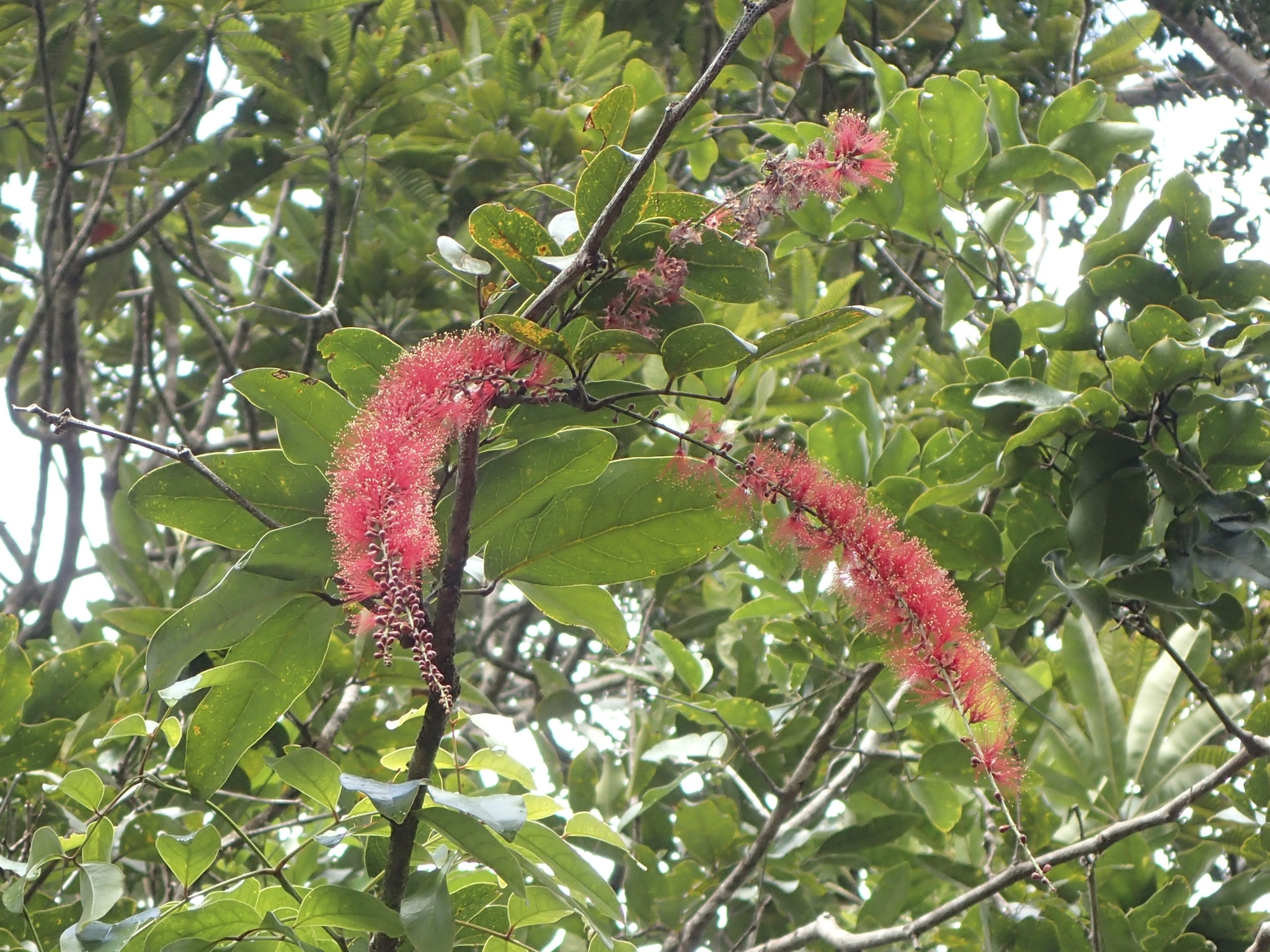

Conservation status
- Vulnerable (IUCN 2.3)

Scientific classification
- Kingdom: Plantae
- Clade: Tracheophytes
- Clade: Angiosperms
- Clade: Eudicots
- Clade: Rosids
- Order: Fabales
- Family: Fabaceae
- Subfamily: Caesalpinioideae
- Clade: Mimosoid clade
- Genus: Archidendropsis
- Species: A. paivana

Binomial name
- Archidendropsis paivana (E.Fourn.) I.C.Nielsen

= Archidendropsis paivana =

Species of legume

Archidendropsis paivana is a species of flowering plant in the family Fabaceae. It is found only in New Caledonia. Its natural habitat is subtropical or tropical dry forests. It is threatened by habitat loss.
