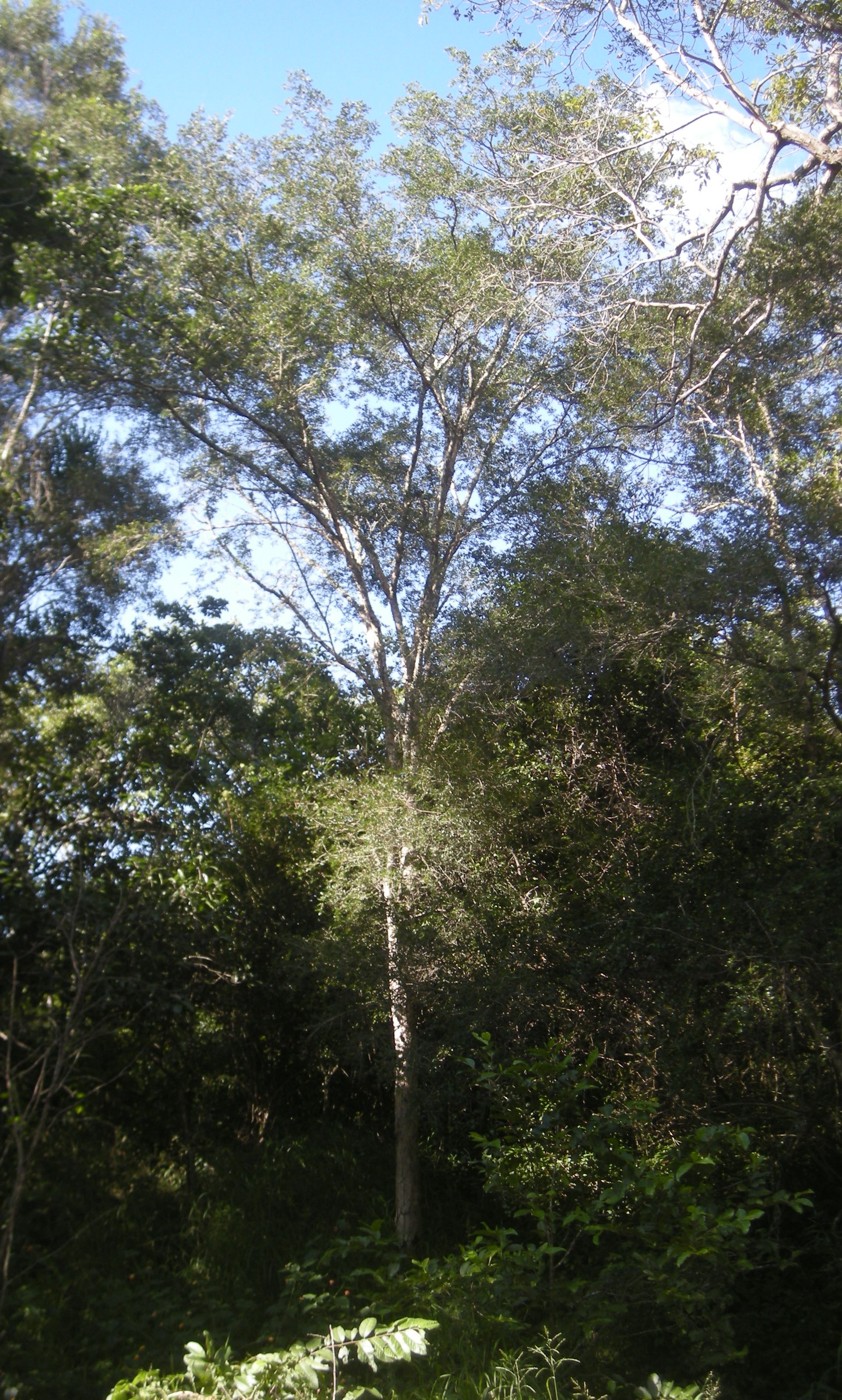

Scientific classification
- Kingdom: Plantae
- Clade: Tracheophytes
- Clade: Angiosperms
- Clade: Eudicots
- Clade: Rosids
- Order: Fabales
- Family: Fabaceae
- Genus: Heliodendron
- Species: H. thozetianum

Binomial name
- Heliodendron thozetianum (F.Muell.) Gill.K.Br. & Bayly (2022)

Synonyms
- Acacia thozetiana F.Muell. (1863); Albizia thozetiana (F.Muell.) F.Muell. ex Benth. (1864); Archidendropsis thozetiana (F.Muell.) I.C.Nielsen (1983); Feuilleea thozetiana (F.Muell.) Kuntze (1891)

= Heliodendron thozetianum =

Species of legume

Heliodendron thozetianum is a species of tree native to the dry rainforests and gallery forests of Queensland, Australia.

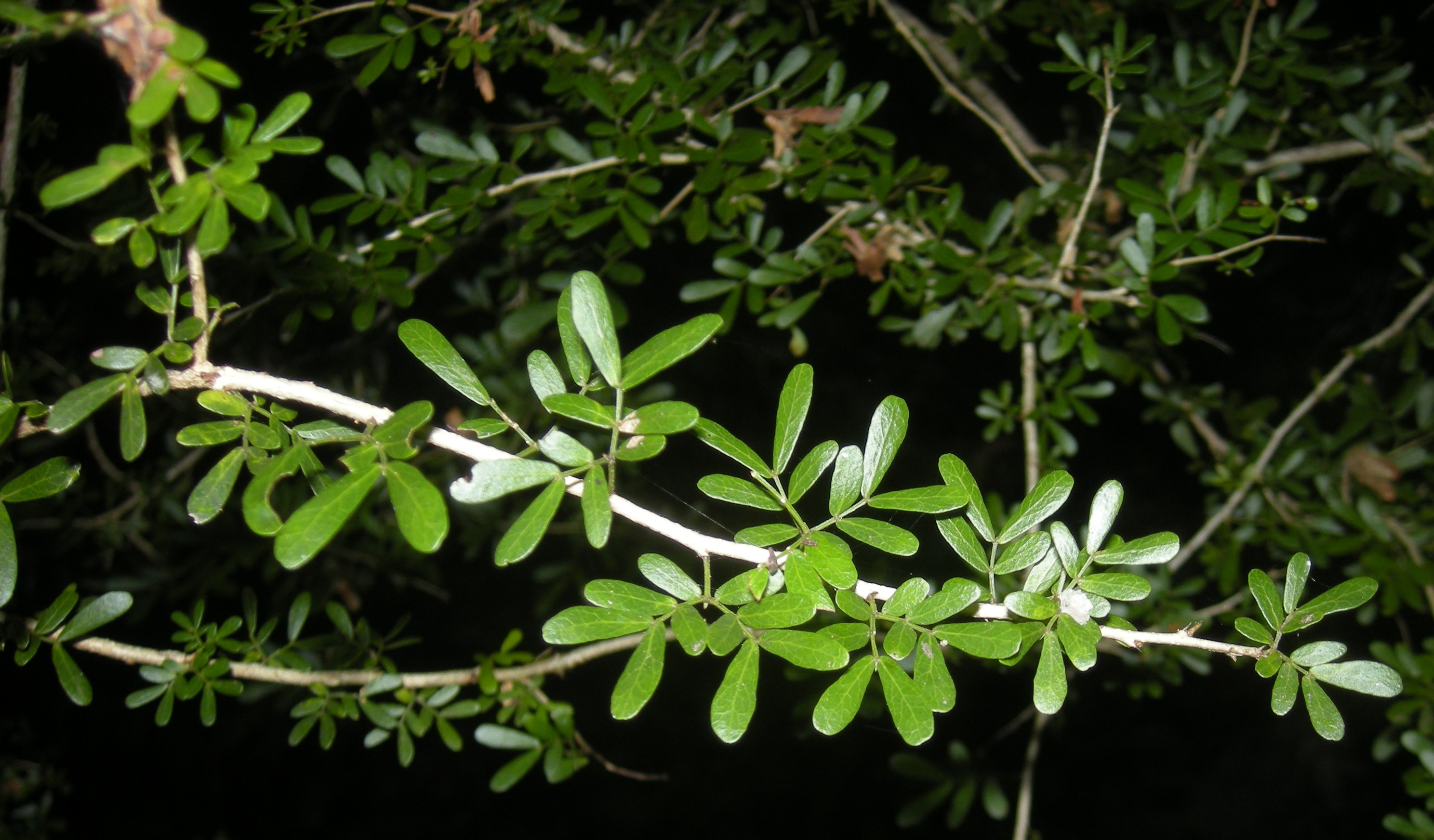
Heliodendron thozetianum foliage
