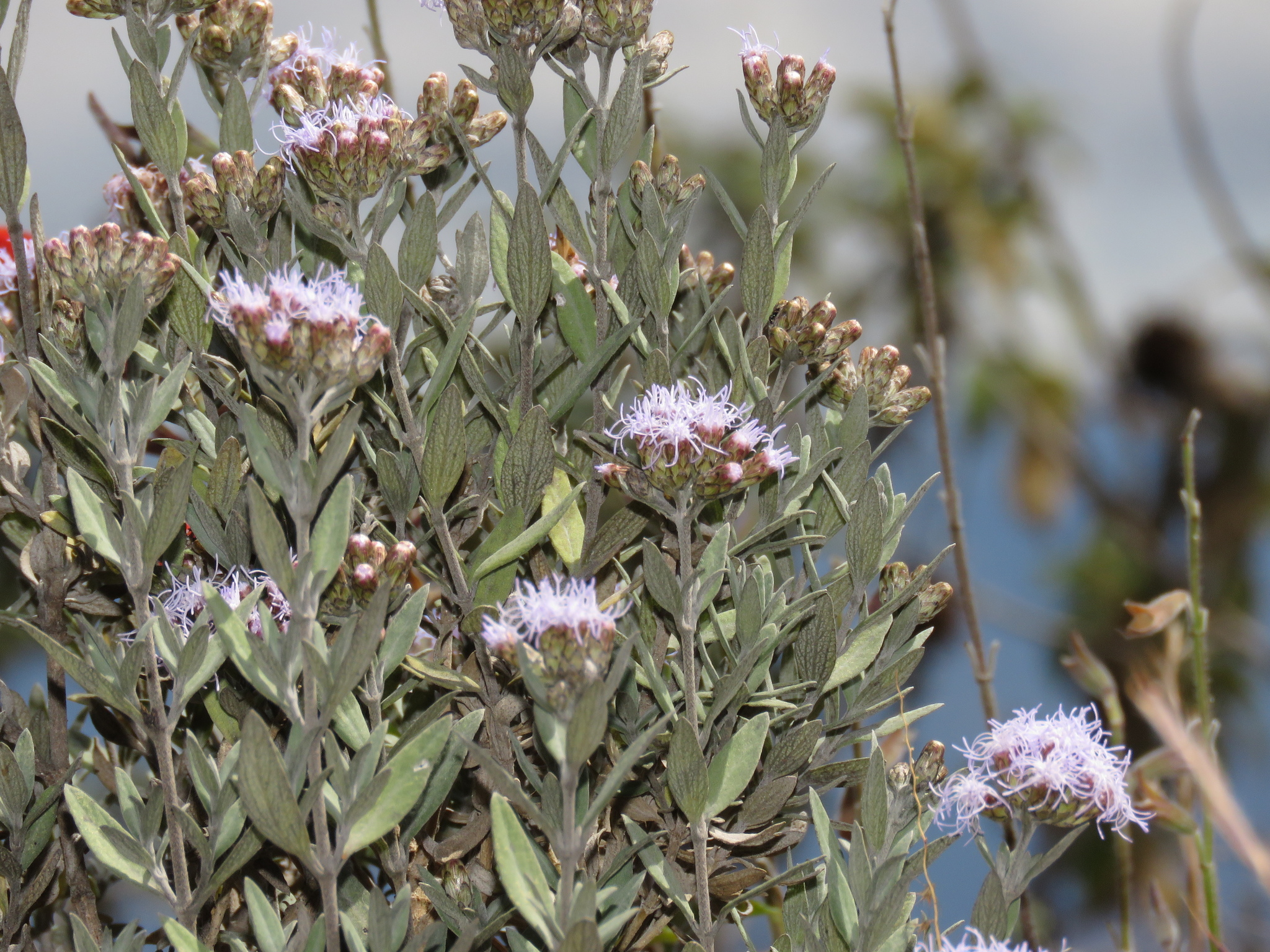
- Cronquistianthus ferreyrae in Peru

Scientific classification
- Kingdom: Plantae
- Clade: Embryophytes
- Clade: Tracheophytes
- Clade: Spermatophytes
- Clade: Angiosperms
- Clade: Eudicots
- Clade: Asterids
- Order: Asterales
- Family: Asteraceae
- Subfamily: Asteroideae
- Tribe: Eupatorieae
- Genus: Cronquistianthus; R.M.King & H.Rob.

= Cronquistianthus =

Genus of flowering plants

Cronquistianthus is a genus of shrubs native to the Andes in Colombia, Ecuador, and Peru.

The genus is named after the American botanist Arthur John Cronquist (1919–1992).

Species

- Cronquistianthus bishopii R.M.King & H.Rob.
- Cronquistianthus bulliferus (S.F.Blake) R.M.King & H.Rob.
- Cronquistianthus callacatensis (Hieron.) R.M.King & H.Rob.
- Cronquistianthus celendensis R.M.King & H.Rob.
- Cronquistianthus celendinensis R.M.King & H.Rob.
- Cronquistianthus chachapoyensis R.M.King & H.Rob.
- Cronquistianthus chamaedrifolius (Kunth) R.M.King & H.Rob.
- Cronquistianthus chotensis (Hieron.) R.M.King & H.Rob.
- Cronquistianthus desmophyllus (B.L.Rob.) R.M.King & H.Rob.
- Cronquistianthus determinatus (B.L.Rob.) R.M.King & H.Rob.
- Cronquistianthus ferreyrae R.M.King & H.Rob.
- Cronquistianthus ferreyrii R.M.King & H.Rob.
- Cronquistianthus glomeratus (DC.) R.M.King & H.Rob.
- Cronquistianthus infantesii R.M.King & H.Rob.
- Cronquistianthus kalenbornianus (B.L.Rob.) R.M.King & H.Rob.
- Cronquistianthus lavandulaefolius (DC.) R.M.King & H.Rob.
- Cronquistianthus lavandulifolius (DC.) R.M.King & H.Rob.
- Cronquistianthus leucophyllus (Kunth) R.M.King & H.Rob.
- Cronquistianthus lopez-mirandae (Cabrera) R.M.King & H.Rob.
- Cronquistianthus macbridei R.M.King & H.Rob.
- Cronquistianthus marrubiifolius (Hieron.) R.M.King & H.Rob.
- Cronquistianthus niveus (Kunth) R.M.King & H.Rob.
- Cronquistianthus origanoides (Kunth) R.M.King & H.Rob.
- Cronquistianthus pseudoriganoides (Hieron.) R.M.King & H.Rob.
- Cronquistianthus rosei R.M.King & H.Rob.
- Cronquistianthus trianae R.M.King & H.Rob.
- Cronquistianthus urubambensis (B.L.Rob.) R.M.King & H.Rob.
- Cronquistianthus volkensii (Hieron.) R.M.King & H.Rob.
