= Cronquistianthus leucophyllus =

Scientific classification
- Kingdom: Plantae
- Clade: Embryophytes
- Clade: Tracheophytes
- Clade: Angiosperms
- Clade: Eudicots
- Clade: Asterids
- Order: Asterales
- Family: Asteraceae
- Genus: Cronquistianthus
- Species: C. leucophyllus

Binomial name
- Cronquistianthus leucophyllus (Kunth) R.M.King & H.Rob.

Synonyms
- Eupatorium leucophyllum Kunth; Cronquistianthus loxensis R.M.King & H.Rob.

Species of plant

Cronquistianthus leucophyllus is a species of flowering plant in the family Asteraceae.

It is native to Ecuador and Peru.
