= Maclurodendron pubescens =

Conservation status
- Least Concern (IUCN 3.1)

Scientific classification
- Kingdom: Plantae
- Clade: Tracheophytes
- Clade: Angiosperms
- Clade: Eudicots
- Clade: Rosids
- Order: Sapindales
- Family: Rutaceae
- Genus: Maclurodendron
- Species: M. pubescens

Binomial name
- Maclurodendron pubescens T. Hartley

Species of tree

Maclurodendron pubescens is a species of plant in the family Rutaceae. It is a tree endemic to Borneo where it is confined to Sabah.

Maclurodendron pubescens is a small to medium-sized tree, growing up to 24 metres tall.

== Range and habitat ==
Maclurodendron pubescens is widespread in the lowlands and foothills of Sabah. It was recorded from Sandakan District, where it is common in the Leila and Kabili Sepilok forest reserves, and in Tenom, Ranau, Beluran, Kinabatangan, and Lahad Datu.

It grows on ridges and hillsides in well-drained primary lowland rain forests and in open disturbed areas from near sea-level to 1,000 metres elevation.
