= Maclurodendron parviflorum =

Conservation status
- Critically Endangered (IUCN 3.1)

Scientific classification
- Kingdom: Plantae
- Clade: Tracheophytes
- Clade: Angiosperms
- Clade: Eudicots
- Clade: Rosids
- Order: Sapindales
- Family: Rutaceae
- Genus: Maclurodendron
- Species: M. parviflorum

Binomial name
- Maclurodendron parviflorum T. Hartley

Species of tree

Maclurodendron parviflorum is a species of plant in the family Rutaceae. It is a tree endemic to Borneo where it is confined to Sarawak.
