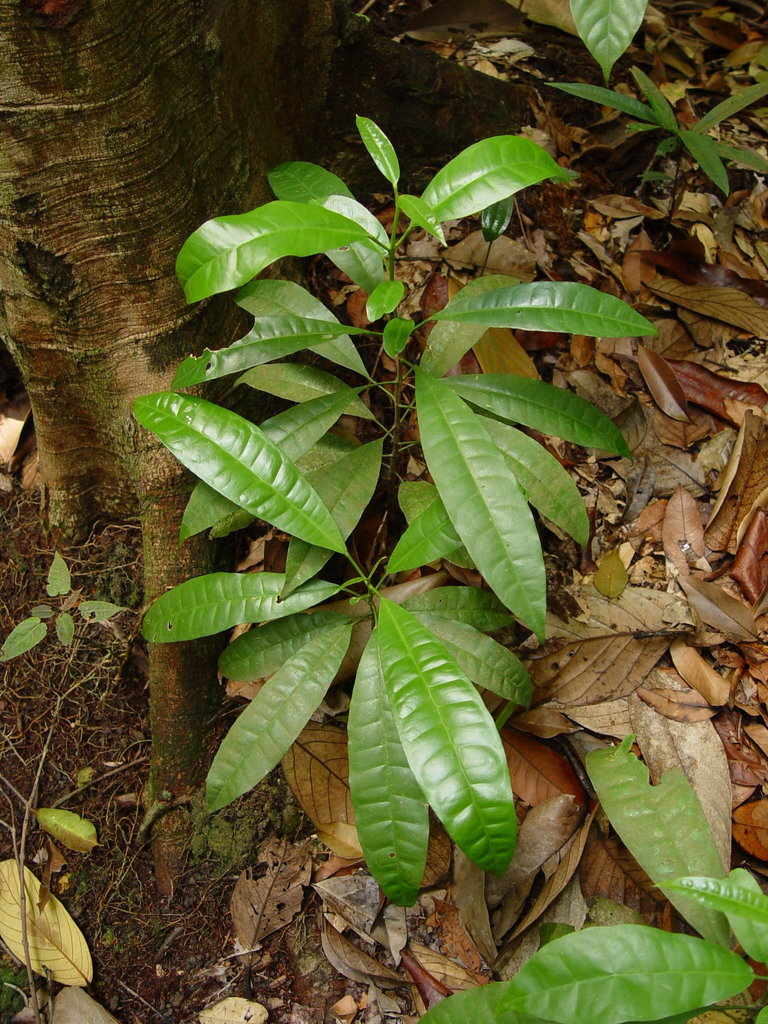
- Maclurodendron porteri

Scientific classification
- Kingdom: Plantae
- Clade: Tracheophytes
- Clade: Angiosperms
- Clade: Eudicots
- Clade: Rosids
- Order: Sapindales
- Family: Rutaceae
- Subfamily: Zanthoxyloideae
- Genus: Maclurodendron; T.G.Hartley

Species
- See text.

= Maclurodendron =

Genus of trees

Maclurodendron is a plant genus in the family Rutaceae. It was first described in 1982 by Thomas Gordon Hartley. It consists of six evergreen tree species native to China and Southeast Asia.

== Description ==
Maclurodendron species are dioecious. The leaves are opposite and the leave blade is 1-foliolate. The inflorescences can be axillary, thyrsoid or racemose. The four sepals are connated on the basis. The four petals are imbricated in the bud. The eight stamens are distinct. The opposite sepals are almost as long as the petals which are in male and in female flowers.

== Species ==
Plants of the World Online recognises six species:

- Maclurodendron magnificum T.G.Hartley
- Maclurodendron obovatum (Merr.) T.G.Hartley
- Maclurodendron oligophlebium (Merr.) T.G.Hartley
- Maclurodendron parviflorum T.G.Hartley
- Maclurodendron porteri (Hook.f.) T.G.Hartley
- Maclurodendron pubescens T.G.Hartley

Maclurodendron obovatum, Maclurodendron oligophlebium, and Maclurodendron porteri were formerly classified by Joseph Dalton Hooker and Elmer Drew Merrill into the genus Acronychia. Maclurodendron parviflorum is listed as critically endangered in the IUCN Red List.
