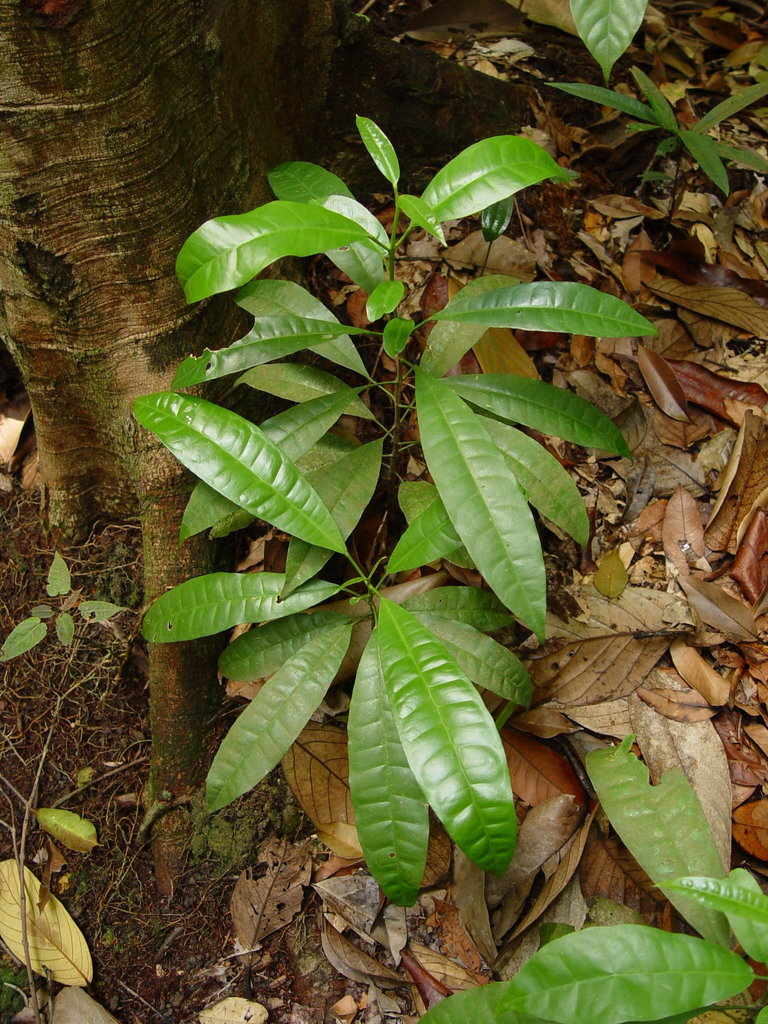

Conservation status
- Least Concern (IUCN 3.1)

Scientific classification
- Kingdom: Plantae
- Clade: Tracheophytes
- Clade: Angiosperms
- Clade: Eudicots
- Clade: Rosids
- Order: Sapindales
- Family: Rutaceae
- Genus: Maclurodendron
- Species: M. porteri

Binomial name
- Maclurodendron porteri (Hook.f.) T.G.Hartley

Synonyms
- Acronychia porteri Hook.f.

= Maclurodendron porteri =

Species of tree

Maclurodendron porteri is a tree in the family Rutaceae.

== Description ==
Maclurodendron porteri grows up to 25 metres (80 ft) tall with a trunk diameter of up to 40 centimetres (16 in). The fruits are roundish to ovoid and measure up to 1.1 cm (0.4 in) in diameter. The wood is locally used in construction.

== Distribution and habitat ==
Maclurodendron porteri grows naturally in Myanmar, Thailand, Sumatra, Peninsular Malaysia, Singapore, Borneo and the Philippines. Its habitat is forests from sea level to 1,400 metres (4,600 ft) elevation.

== Taxonomy ==
It was first described in 1875 as Acronychia porteri by Joseph Dalton Hooker, but in 1982 was assigned to the genus, Maclurodendron by Thomas Gordon Hartley.
