= Mikaniopsis =

Scientific classification
- Kingdom: Plantae
- Clade: Tracheophytes
- Clade: Angiosperms
- Clade: Eudicots
- Clade: Asterids
- Order: Asterales
- Family: Asteraceae
- Subfamily: Asteroideae
- Tribe: Senecioneae
- Genus: Mikaniopsis; Milne-Redh.

Genus of flowering plants

Mikaniopsis is a genus of African flowering plant in the groundsel tribe within the sunflower family.

Species

- Mikaniopsis bambuseti
- Mikaniopsis camarae
- Mikaniopsis cissampelina
- Mikaniopsis clematoides
- Mikaniopsis kivuensis
- Mikaniopsis kundelungensis
- Mikaniopsis maitlandii
- Mikaniopsis nyungwensis
- Mikaniopsis paniculata
- Mikaniopsis rwandensis
- Mikaniopsis tanganyikensis
- Mikaniopsis tedliei
- Mikaniopsis troupinii
- Mikaniopsis usambarensis
- Mikaniopsis vitalba
