= Mikaniopsis maitlandii =

Conservation status
- Vulnerable (IUCN 3.1)

Scientific classification
- Kingdom: Plantae
- Clade: Tracheophytes
- Clade: Angiosperms
- Clade: Eudicots
- Clade: Asterids
- Order: Asterales
- Family: Asteraceae
- Genus: Mikaniopsis
- Species: M. maitlandii

Binomial name
- Mikaniopsis maitlandii C.D.Adams

Species of flowering plant

Mikaniopsis maitlandii is a species of flowering plant in the family Asteraceae. It is found in Cameroon, Equatorial Guinea, and Nigeria. Its natural habitats are subtropical or tropical moist lowland forests and subtropical or tropical moist montane forests. It is threatened by habitat loss.
