= Mikaniopsis vitalba =

Conservation status
- Vulnerable (IUCN 3.1)

Scientific classification
- Kingdom: Plantae
- Clade: Tracheophytes
- Clade: Angiosperms
- Clade: Eudicots
- Clade: Asterids
- Order: Asterales
- Family: Asteraceae
- Genus: Mikaniopsis
- Species: M. vitalba

Binomial name
- Mikaniopsis vitalba (S.Moore) Milne-Redh.

Species of flowering plant

Mikaniopsis vitalba is a species of flowering plant in the family Asteraceae. It is found in Angola, Cameroon, Democratic Republic of the Congo, Gabon, and Uganda. Its natural habitats are subtropical or tropical moist lowland forests, subtropical or tropical swamps, subtropical or tropical moist montane forests, and moist savanna. It is threatened by habitat loss.
