= Sciadocephala =

Scientific classification
- Kingdom: Plantae
- Clade: Tracheophytes
- Clade: Angiosperms
- Clade: Eudicots
- Clade: Asterids
- Order: Asterales
- Family: Asteraceae
- Subfamily: Asteroideae
- Tribe: Eupatorieae
- Genus: Sciadocephala; Mattf.

Type species
- Sciadocephala schultze-rhonhofiae Mattf.

Genus of plants

Sciadocephala is a genus of Latin American plants in the tribe Eupatorieae within the family Asteraceae.

Species

- Sciadocephala amazonica R.M.King & H.Rob. – Colombia, Ecuador
- Sciadocephala asplundii R.M.King & H.Rob. – Ecuador
- Sciadocephala dressleri R.M.King & H.Rob. – Panama, Ecuador
- Sciadocephala pakaraimae (Maguire & Wurdack) R.M.King & H.Rob. – Guyana
- Sciadocephala schultze-rhonhofiae Mattf. – Ecuador, Peru
