= Archidendron oblongum =

Conservation status
- Vulnerable (IUCN 2.3)

Scientific classification
- Kingdom: Plantae
- Clade: Tracheophytes
- Clade: Angiosperms
- Clade: Eudicots
- Clade: Rosids
- Order: Fabales
- Family: Fabaceae
- Subfamily: Caesalpinioideae
- Clade: Mimosoid clade
- Genus: Archidendron
- Species: A. oblongum

Binomial name
- Archidendron oblongum (Hemsl.) de Wit

Species of legume

Archidendron oblongum is a species of legume in the family Fabaceae. It is found only in Solomon Islands.
