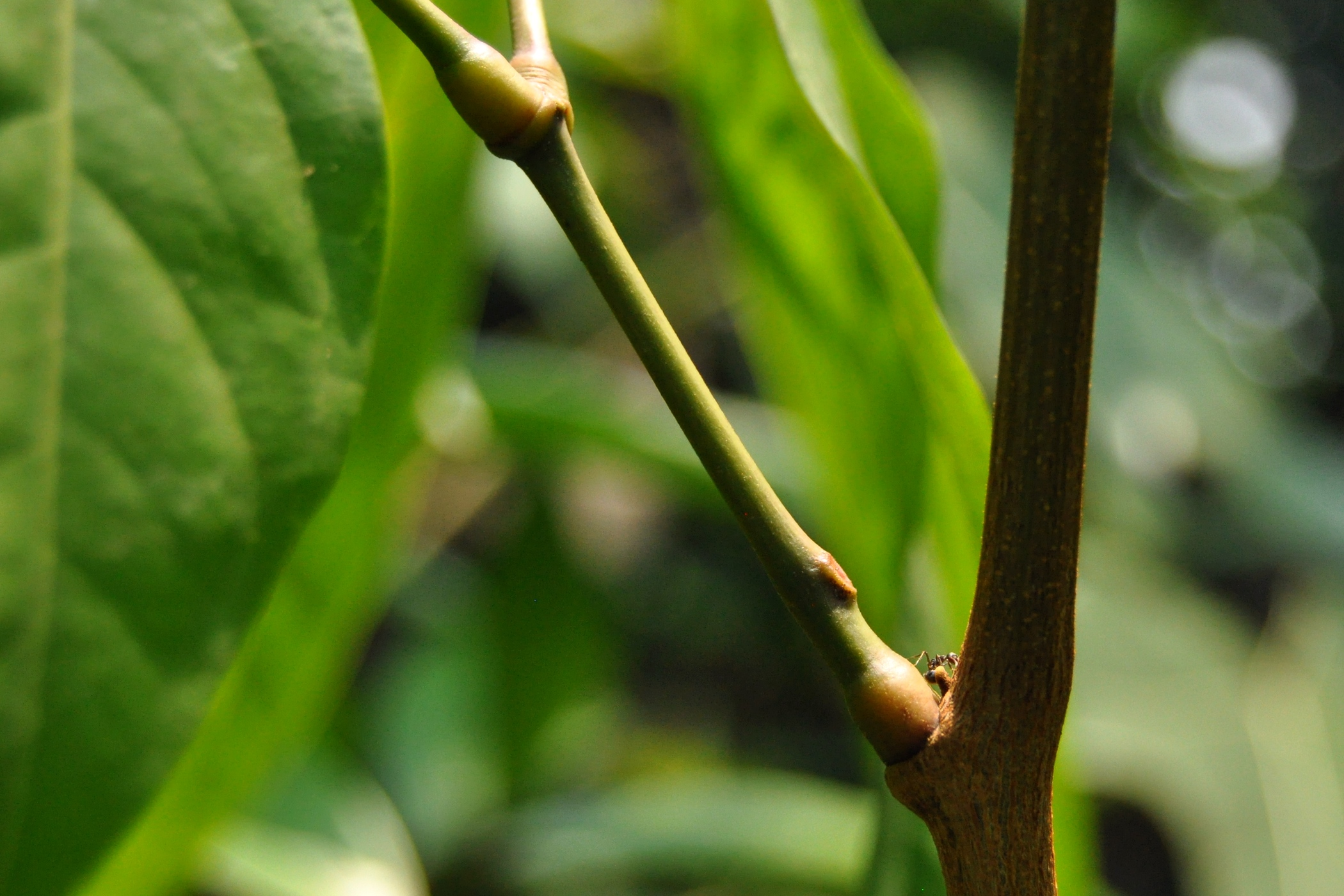
- Leaf stalk in Java

Scientific classification
- Kingdom: Plantae
- Clade: Embryophytes
- Clade: Tracheophytes
- Clade: Spermatophytes
- Clade: Angiosperms
- Clade: Eudicots
- Clade: Rosids
- Order: Fabales
- Family: Fabaceae
- Subfamily: Caesalpinioideae
- Clade: Mimosoid clade
- Genus: Archidendron
- Species: A. pauciflorum

Binomial name
- Archidendron pauciflorum (Benth.) I.C.Nielsen (1984 publ. 1985)

Subspecies
- Archidendron pauciflorum var. caulostachyum (Merr.) I.C.Nielsen; Archidendron pauciflorum var. pauciflorum

Synonyms
- Abarema pauciflora (Benth.) Kosterm. (1954); Pithecellobium pauciflorum Benth. (1844)

= Archidendron pauciflorum =

Species of plant

Archidendron pauciflorum is a species of flowering plant in the family Fabaceae. It is native to Sulawesi, the Philippines, and the Lesser Sunda Islands.
