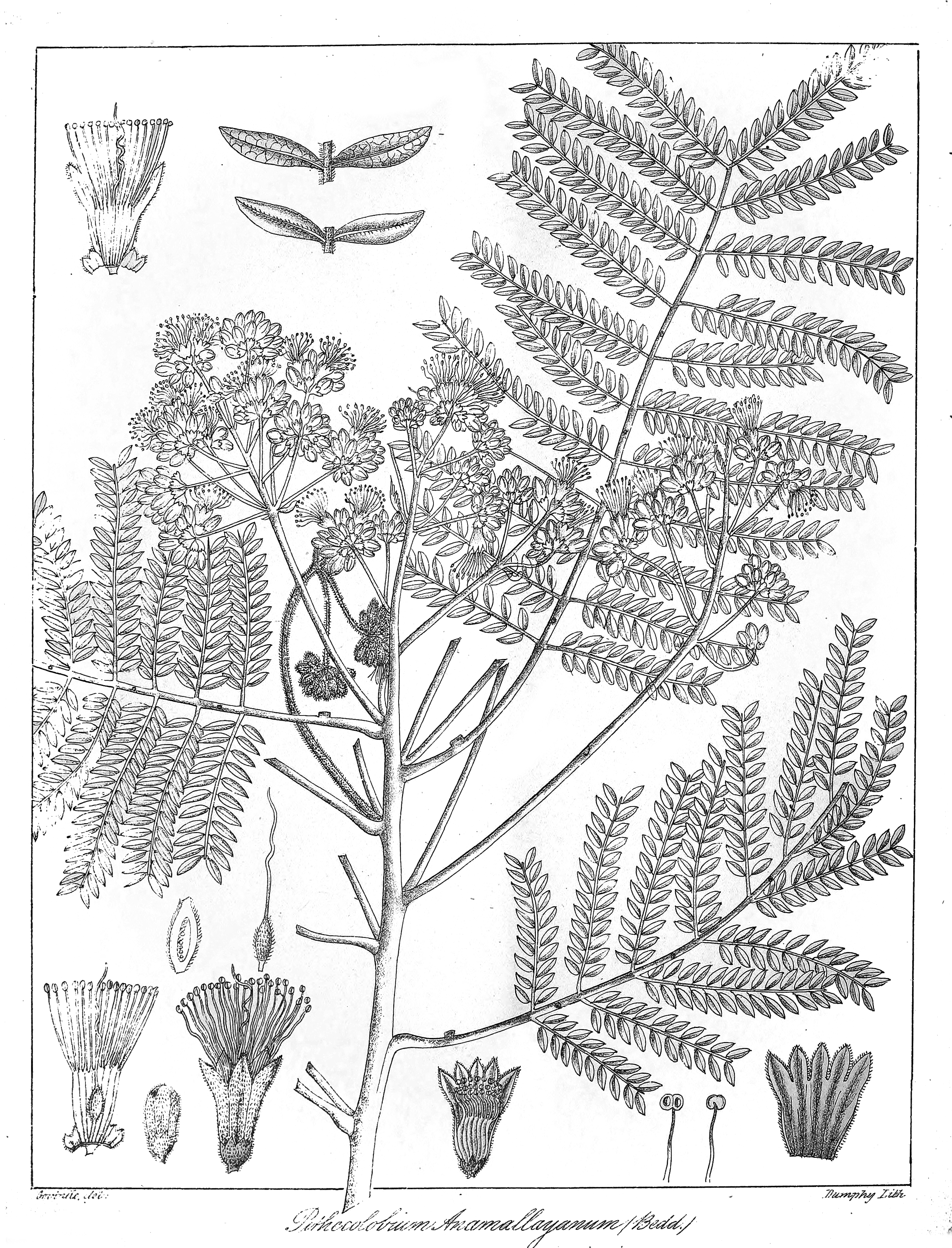

Scientific classification
- Kingdom: Plantae
- Clade: Tracheophytes
- Clade: Angiosperms
- Clade: Eudicots
- Clade: Rosids
- Order: Fabales
- Family: Fabaceae
- Subfamily: Caesalpinioideae
- Clade: Mimosoid clade
- Genus: Archidendron
- Species: A. clypearia
- Subspecies: A. c. subsp. subcoriaceum

Trinomial name
- Archidendron clypearia subsp. subcoriaceum (Thwaites) I.C.Nielsen

Synonyms
- Abarema subcoriacea (Thwaites) Kosterm.; Albizia subcoriacea (Thwaites) F.Muell.; Archidendron clypearia var. subcoriacea (Thwaites) M.G.Gangop. & Chakra; Pithecellobium anamalayanum Bedd.; Pithecellobium subcoriaceum Thwaites

= Archidendron clypearia subsp. subcoriaceum =

Subspecies of legume

Archidendron clypearia subsp. subcoriaceum is a subspecies of an Archidendron clypearia in the legume family (Fabaceae). It is found in India and Sri Lanka.
