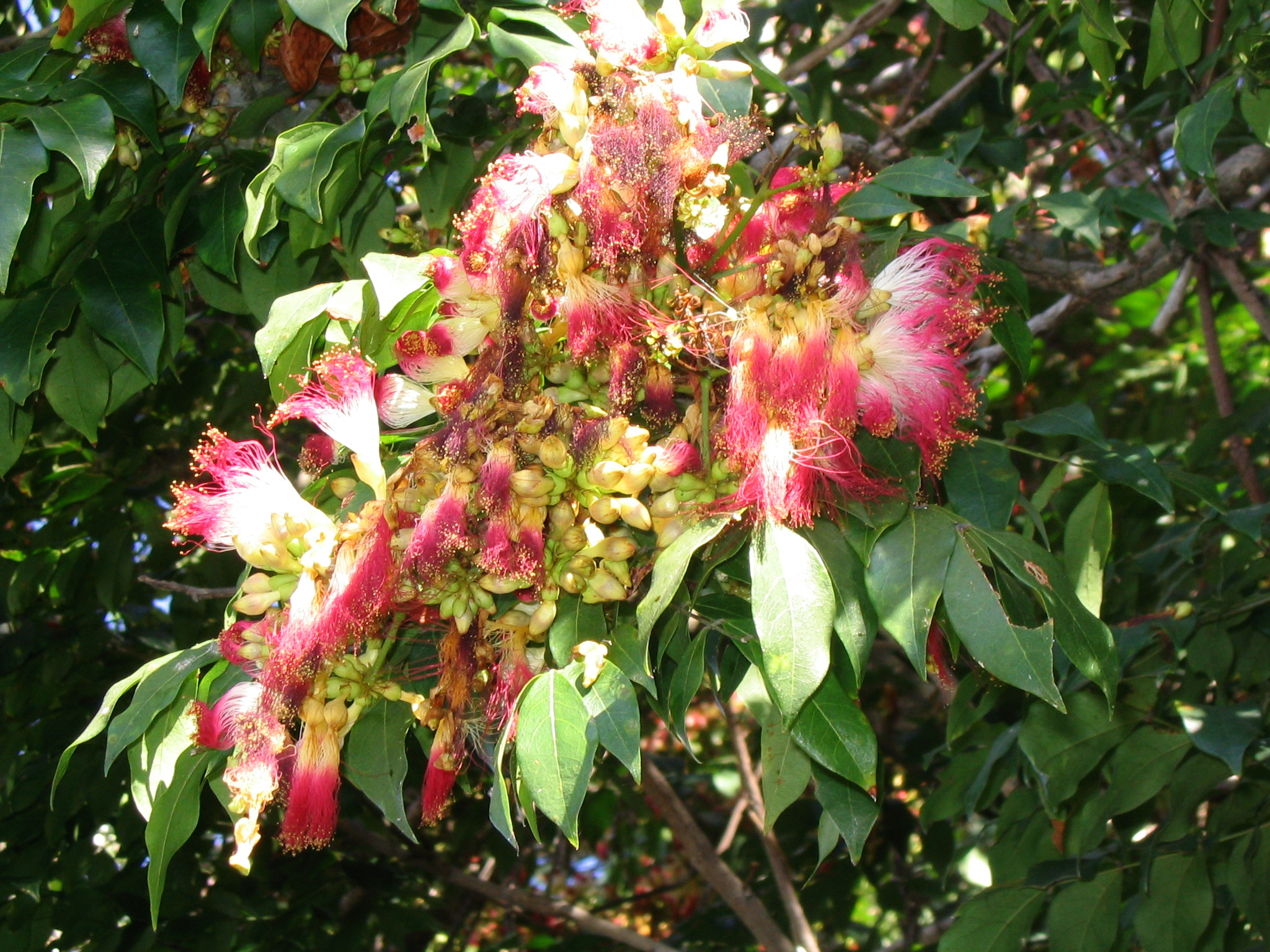
- In bloom near Wagetti, Queensland, Australia

Scientific classification
- Kingdom: Plantae
- Clade: Tracheophytes
- Clade: Angiosperms
- Clade: Eudicots
- Clade: Rosids
- Order: Fabales
- Family: Fabaceae
- Subfamily: Caesalpinioideae
- Clade: Mimosoid clade
- Genus: Archidendron
- Species: A. grandiflorum

Binomial name
- Archidendron grandiflorum Sol. ex Benth.

Synonyms
- Abarema grandiflora (Benth.)Kosterm.; Albizia tozeri (F.Muell.)F.Muell.; Feuilleea tozeri (F.Muell.)Kuntze; Pithecellobium grandiflorum Benth.; Pithecellobium tozeri F.Muell.

= Archidendron grandiflorum =

Species of legume

Archidendron grandiflorum, the pink laceflower, is a species of tree found in northern Australia and New Guinea. This tree reaches a height of 15 meters and bears showy pink and cream colored flowers. The mature tree has a rounded habit and is used as an ornamental. This tree is also called the lace flower tree, paintbrush tree, tassel tree, and tulip siris.
