= Archidendron forbesii =

Conservation status
- Endangered (IUCN 3.1)

Scientific classification
- Kingdom: Plantae
- Clade: Tracheophytes
- Clade: Angiosperms
- Clade: Eudicots
- Clade: Rosids
- Order: Fabales
- Family: Fabaceae
- Subfamily: Caesalpinioideae
- Clade: Mimosoid clade
- Genus: Archidendron
- Species: A. forbesii

Binomial name
- Archidendron forbesii Bak.f.

Species of legume

Archidendron forbesii is a species of legume in the family Fabaceae. It is found only in Papua New Guinea. It is threatened by habitat loss.
