= Archidendron lovelliae =

Scientific classification
- Kingdom: Plantae
- Clade: Tracheophytes
- Clade: Angiosperms
- Clade: Eudicots
- Clade: Rosids
- Order: Fabales
- Family: Fabaceae
- Subfamily: Caesalpinioideae
- Clade: Mimosoid clade
- Genus: Archidendron
- Species: A. lovelliae

Binomial name
- Archidendron lovelliae (Bailey) I.Nielsen

Species of legume

Archidendron lovelliae, the bacon wood or tulip siris, is a small tree with a very restricted range in eastern Australia.

The bacon wood stands about 5 meters tall and has a rounded habit. Flowers are red, and the black seeds are contained in orange pods. Leaves are bipinnate.
