= Archidendron lucidum =

Scientific classification
- Kingdom: Plantae
- Clade: Tracheophytes
- Clade: Angiosperms
- Clade: Eudicots
- Clade: Rosids
- Order: Fabales
- Family: Fabaceae
- Subfamily: Caesalpinioideae
- Clade: Mimosoid clade
- Genus: Archidendron
- Species: A. lucidum

Binomial name
- Archidendron lucidum (Benth.) I.C.Nielsen

Species of legume

Archidendron lucidum is a tree species in the legume family (Fabaceae).
