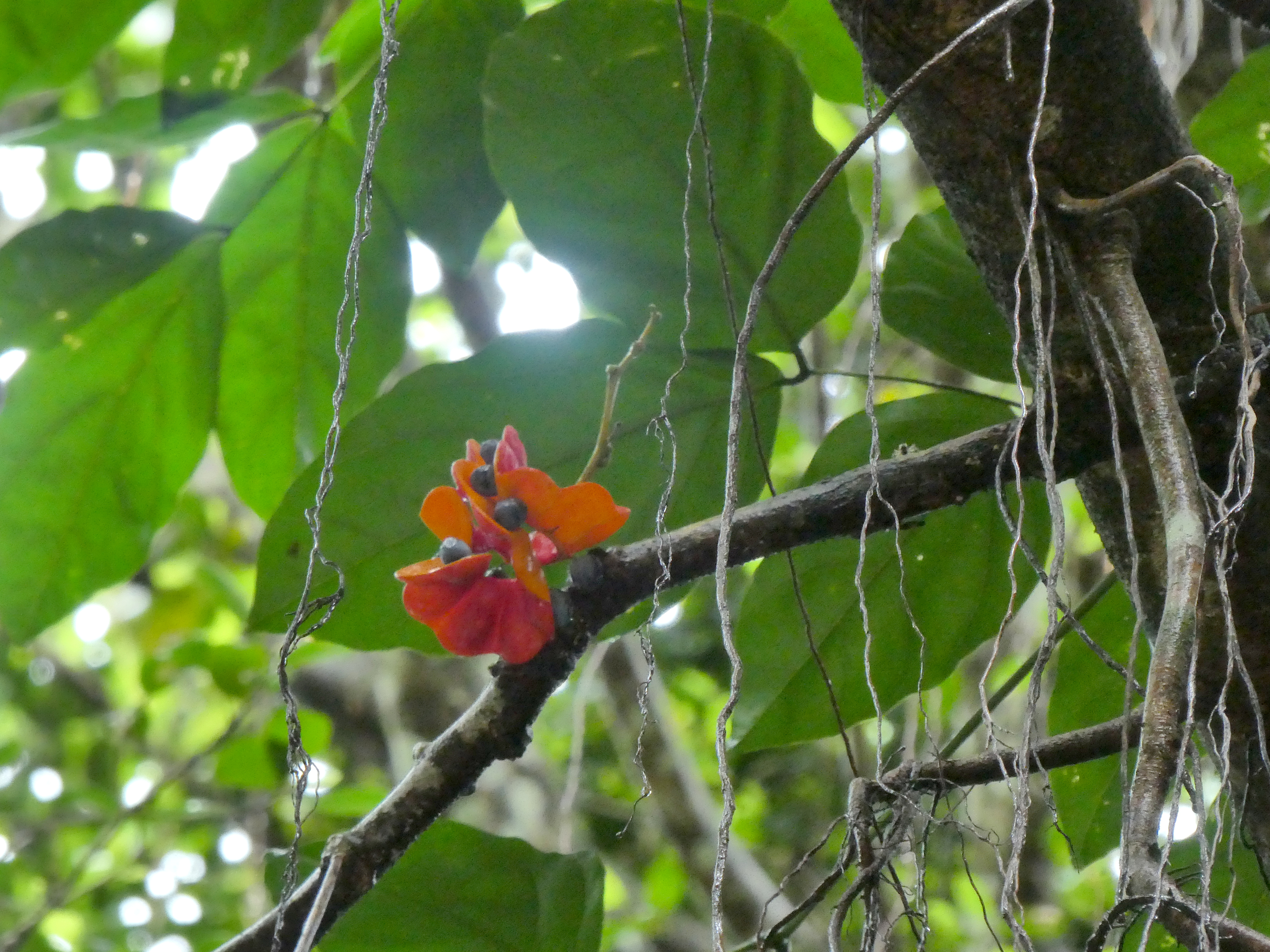
- Ripened fruit and foliage

Conservation status
- Least Concern (NCA)
- Near Threatened (IUCN 3.1)

Scientific classification
- Kingdom: Plantae
- Clade: Tracheophytes
- Clade: Angiosperms
- Clade: Eudicots
- Clade: Rosids
- Order: Fabales
- Family: Fabaceae
- Subfamily: Caesalpinioideae
- Clade: Mimosoid clade
- Genus: Archidendron
- Species: A. vaillantii

Binomial name
- Archidendron vaillantii (F.Muell.) F.Muell.

Synonyms
- Homotypic synonyms: Affonsea vaillantii (F.Muell.) Kuntze; Pithecellobium vaillantii F.Muell.; Heterotypic synonyms: Albizia vaillantii F.Muell.; Albizia vaillantii var. pentzkeana Ewart

= Archidendron vaillantii =

Salmon bean

Species of flowering plant

Archidendron vaillantii, commonly known as the salmon bean, is an evergreen tree in the legume family of Fabaceae. It is endemic to the rainforests of northeast Queensland.

== Description ==
Archidendron vaillantii is a tree growing up to 25 m (82 ft) high and 30 cm (12 in) diameter. The large evenly bipinnate leaves are around 60 cm (24 in) wide and long with usually 2 pairs of leaflets or pinnae, which in turn are further divided into 2-4 pairs of subleaflets or pinnules (see Gallery). The subleaflets are dark glossy green, elliptic to orbicular and slightly asymmetric, measuring up to 20 by 11 cm (7.9 by 4.3 in), and have very short petioles.

The inflorescences are axillary or terminal panicles, each a cluster of 4–8 flowers on pedicels about 5 mm (0.20 in) long. Flowers are yellowish, the calyx greenish, up to 35 mm (1.4 in) long with 5 petals.

The fruit is a twisted or tightly coiled dehiscent pod, red on the outside and yellow inside, up to 135 mm (5.3 in) long by 15 mm (0.59 in) wide, containing a number of glossy black seeds about 10–15 mm (0.39–0.59 in) long.

== Taxonomy ==
This species was first described in April 1865 by the German born Victorian Government botanist Ferdinand von Mueller, who published a description in his tome Fragmenta phytographiæ Australiæ. His description was based on material collected by John Dallachy in the Seaview Range west of Ingham. Mueller revised his description later in the same year and transferred the species to Archidendron.

The taxon was reviewed twice more — first by Carl Ernst Otto Kuntze in 1891, giving it the combination Affonsea vailantii, and then by Alfred James Ewart in 1907 who described a subspecies Albizia vaillantii var. pentzkeana, however neither of these names are now accepted.

=== Etymology ===
The genus name Archidendron is a combination of the Latin prefix archi- meaning "main", "chief" or "leading", and the Ancient Greek word δένδρον (déndron), meaning "tree". The species epithet vaillantii was given by Mueller in honour of the marshall of France, Jean-Baptiste Philibert Vaillant.

== Distribution and habitat ==
The salmon bean is restricted to the coastal area from about Rossville south to the Paluma Range National Park. It grows in rainforest on various soils at altitudes from sea level to 1,200 m (3,900 ft).

== Conservation ==
This species, which is endemic to Queensland, has been classified by the Queensland Department of Environment and Science (DES) as least concern, but DES provides no explanation as to the process of, or the reason for, this assessment.

In September 2010 the International Union for Conservation of Nature (IUCN) assessed it as near threatened. The justification for this assessment published by IUCN cites the reduction of the species' natural habitat, and the existence of the pathogen Phytophthora cinnamomi within its range.

== Gallery ==
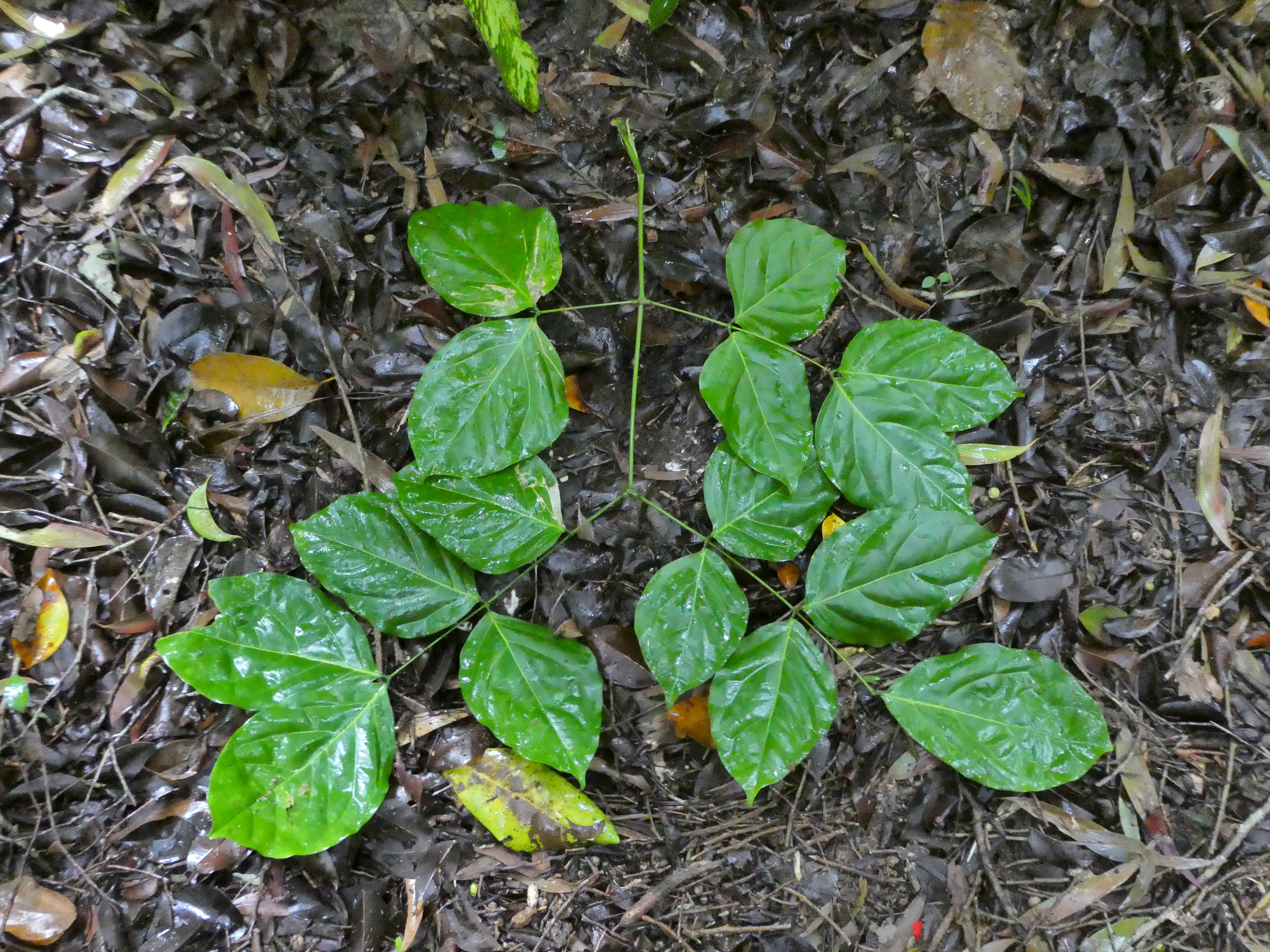
The compound leaf

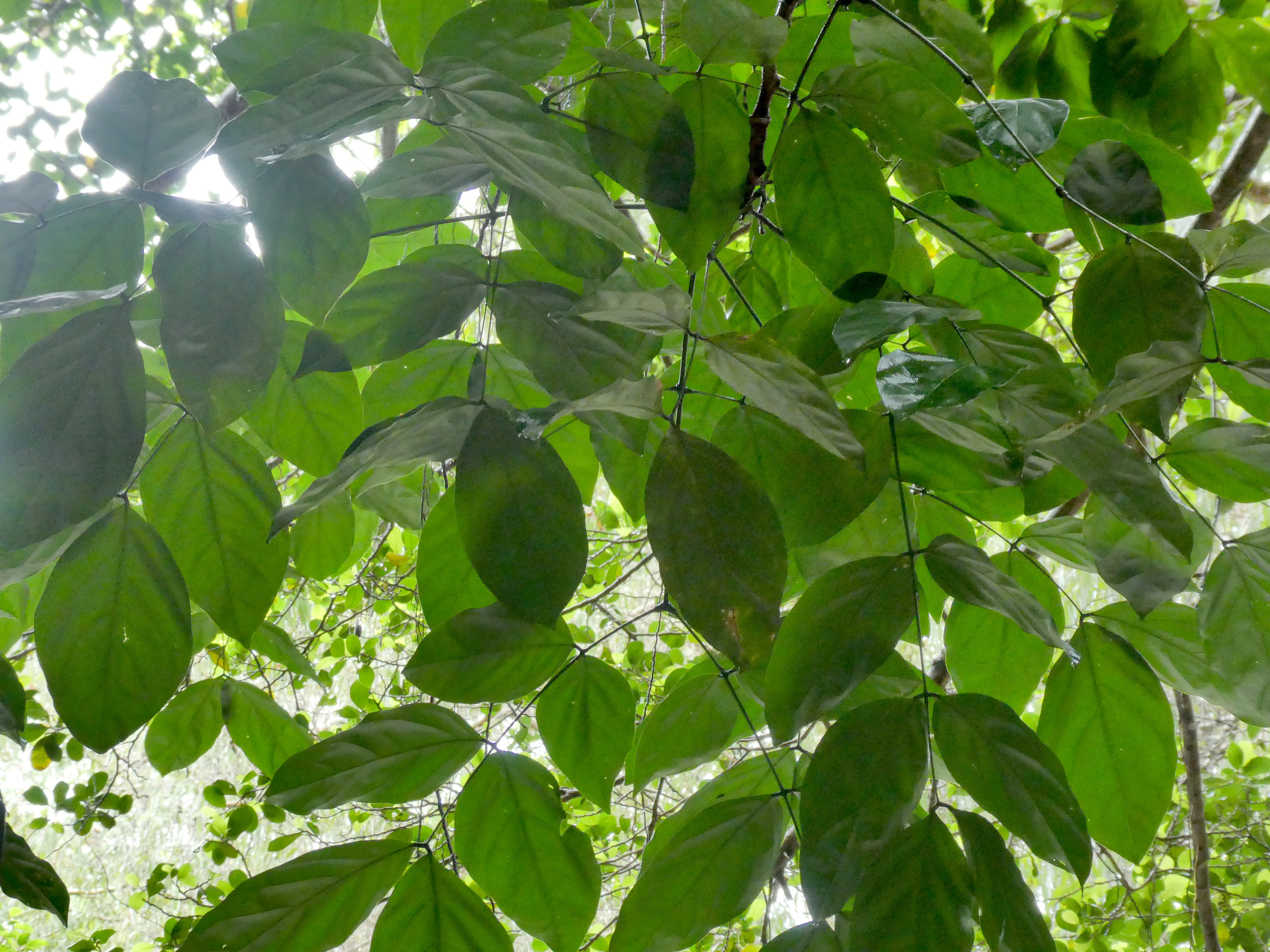
Foliage

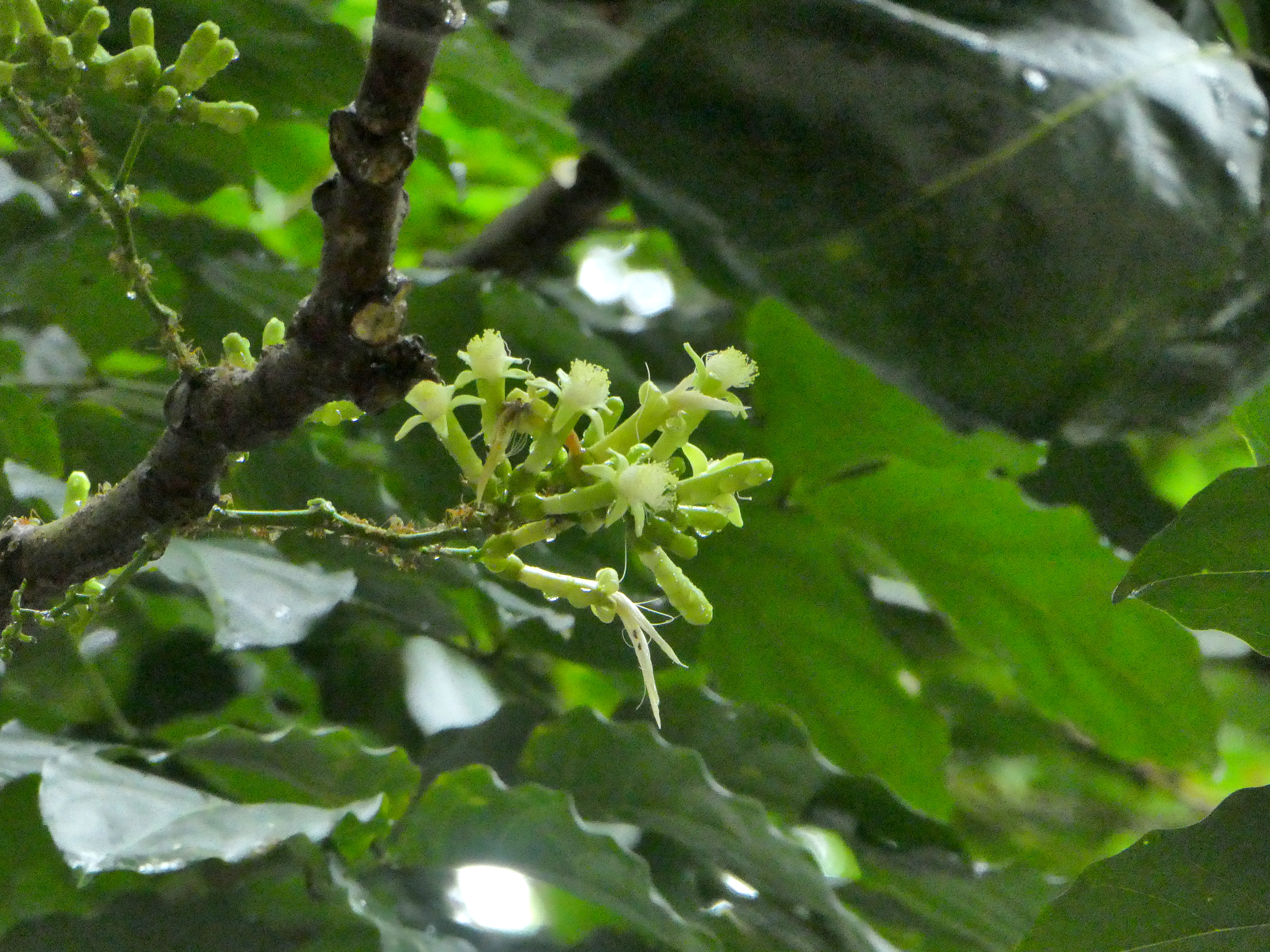
Flowers

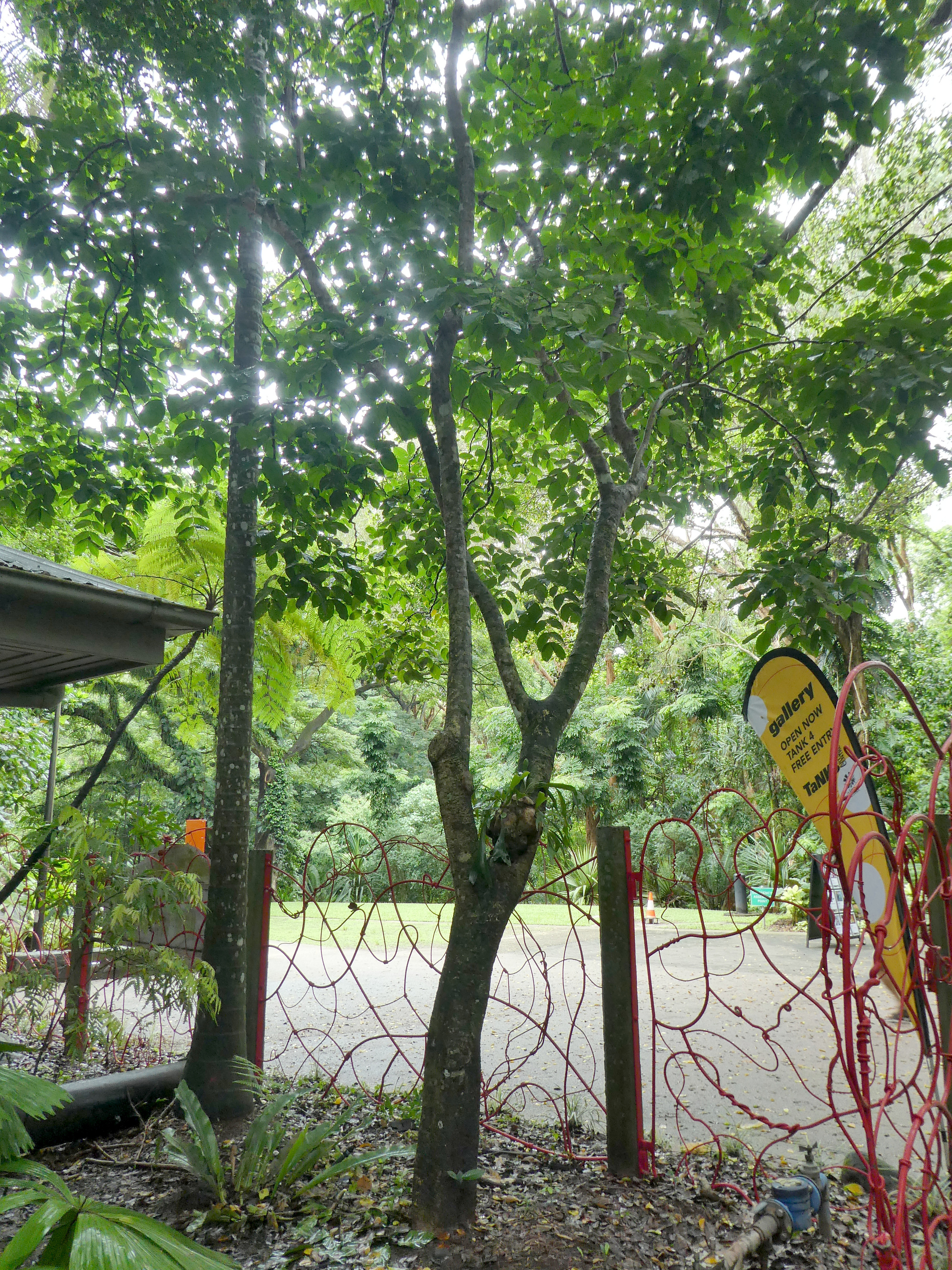
Tree

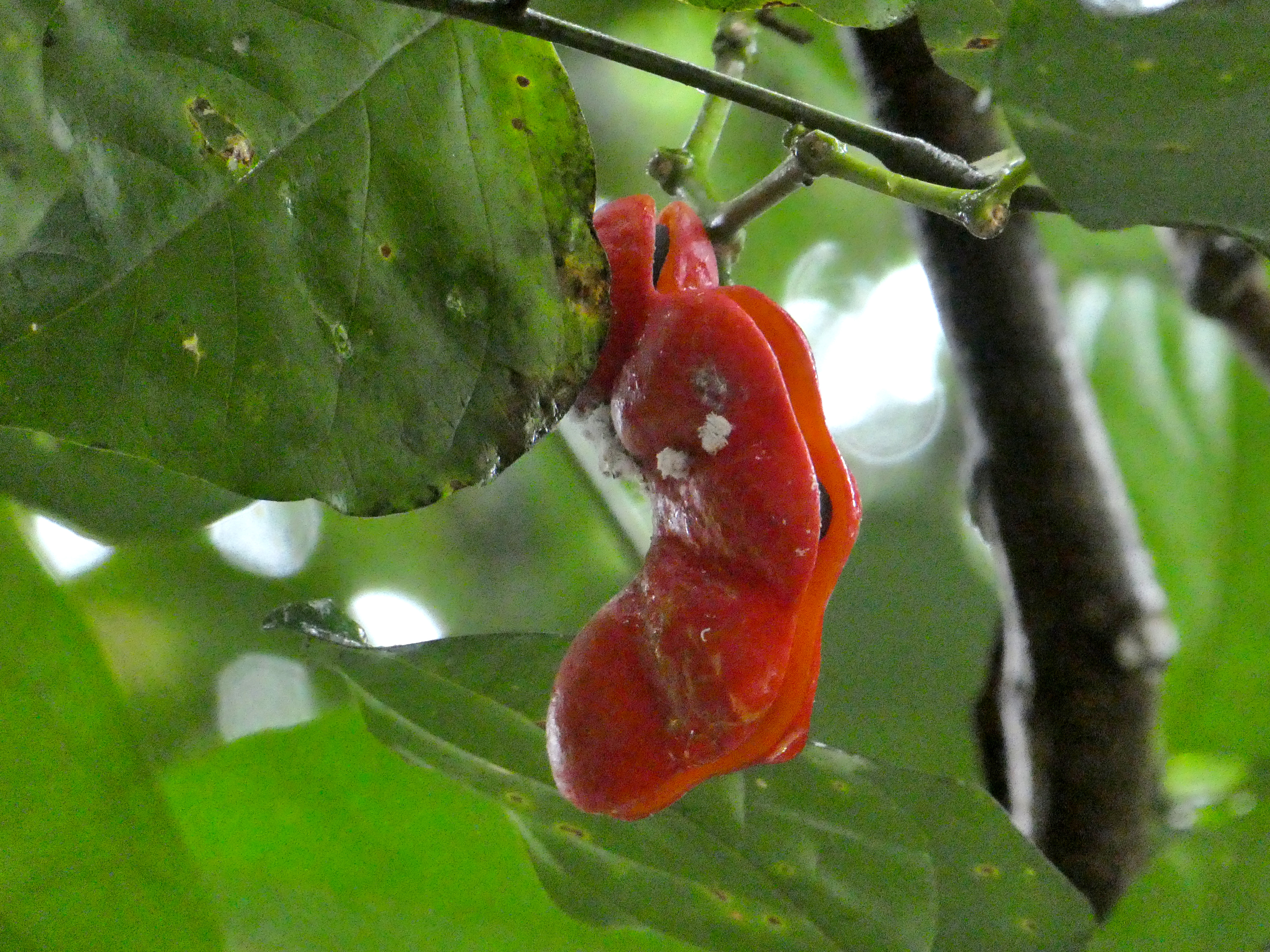
Fruit

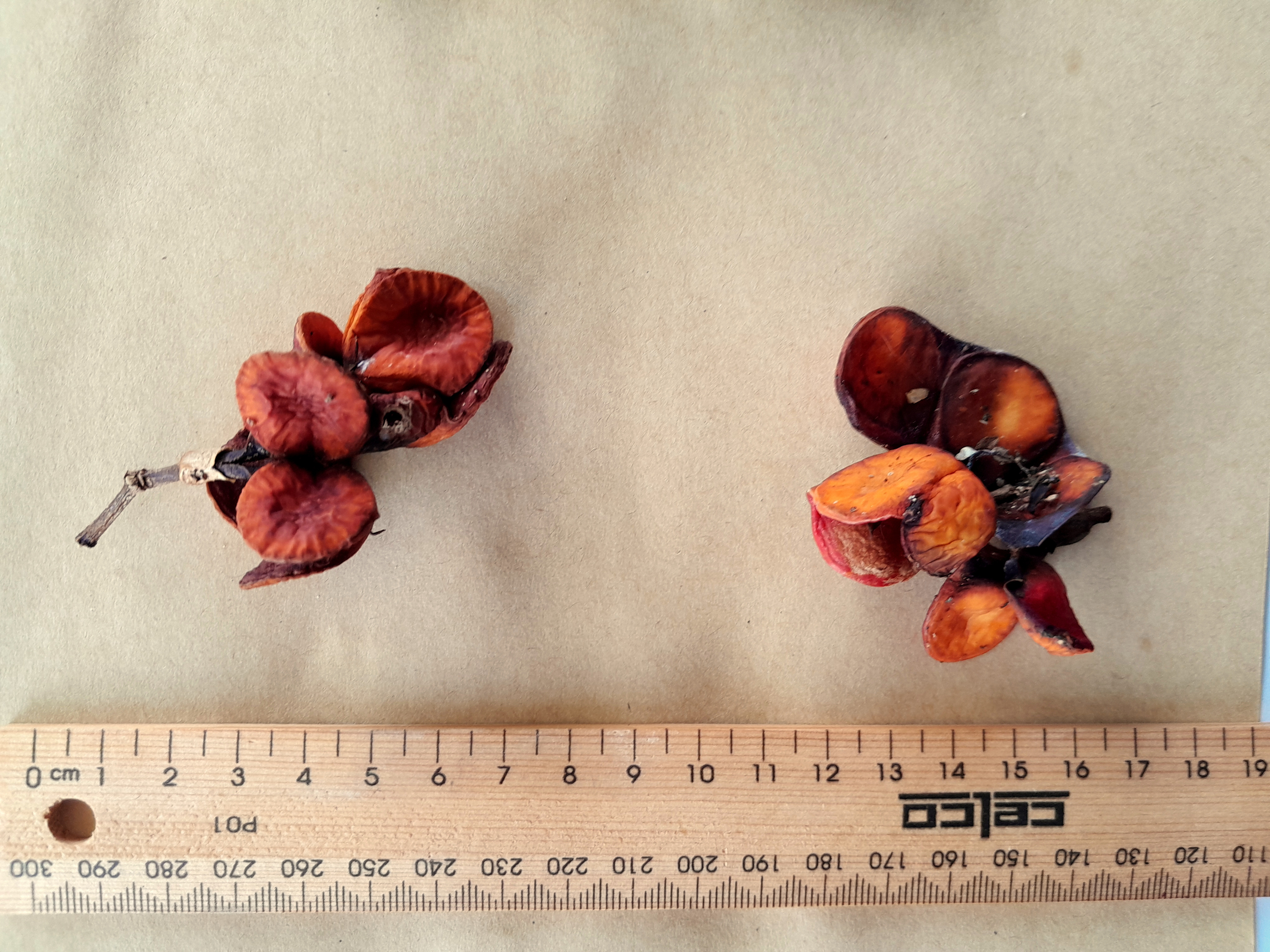
Fruit with a standard 30 cm/12in ruler

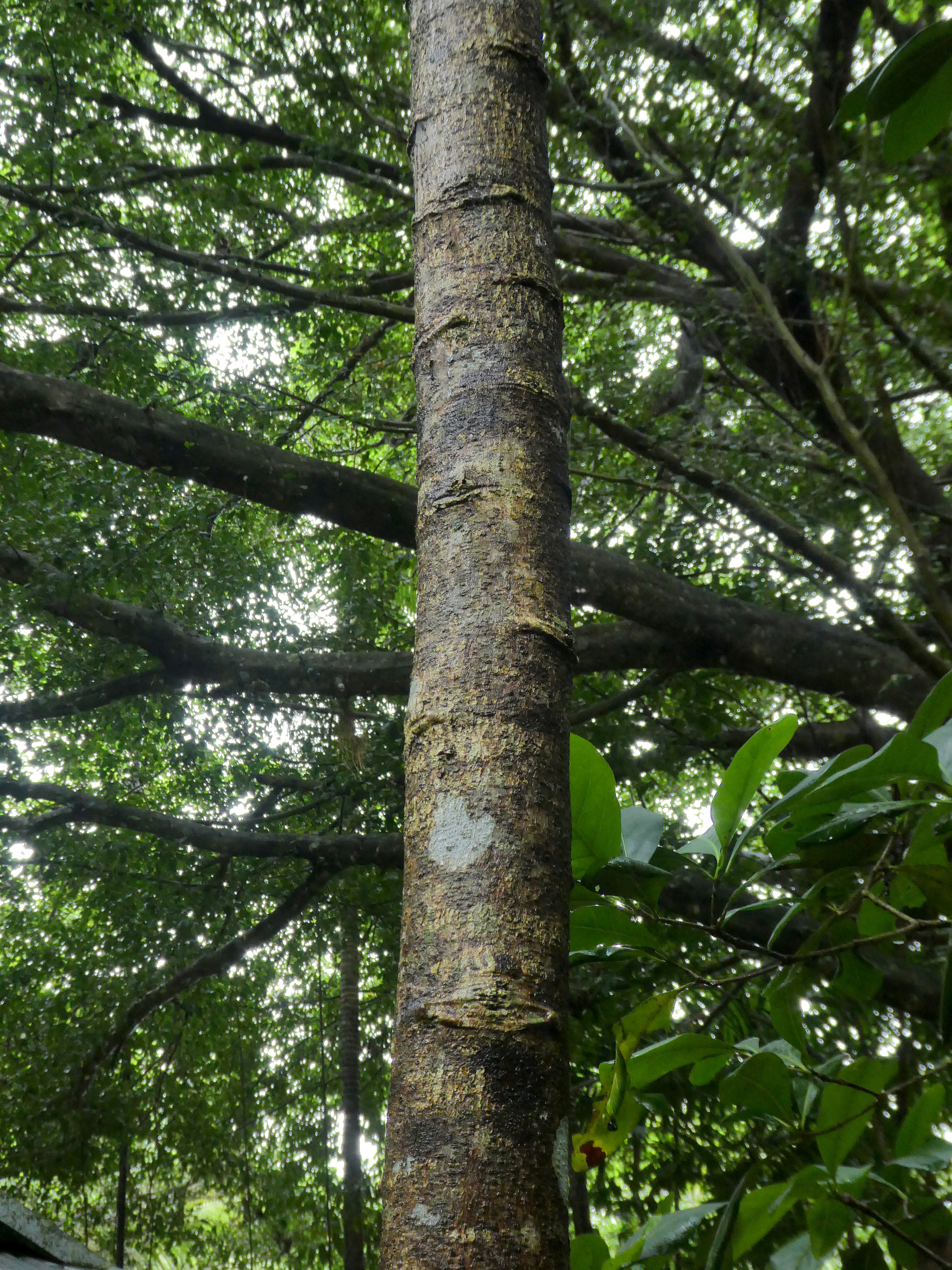
Trunk

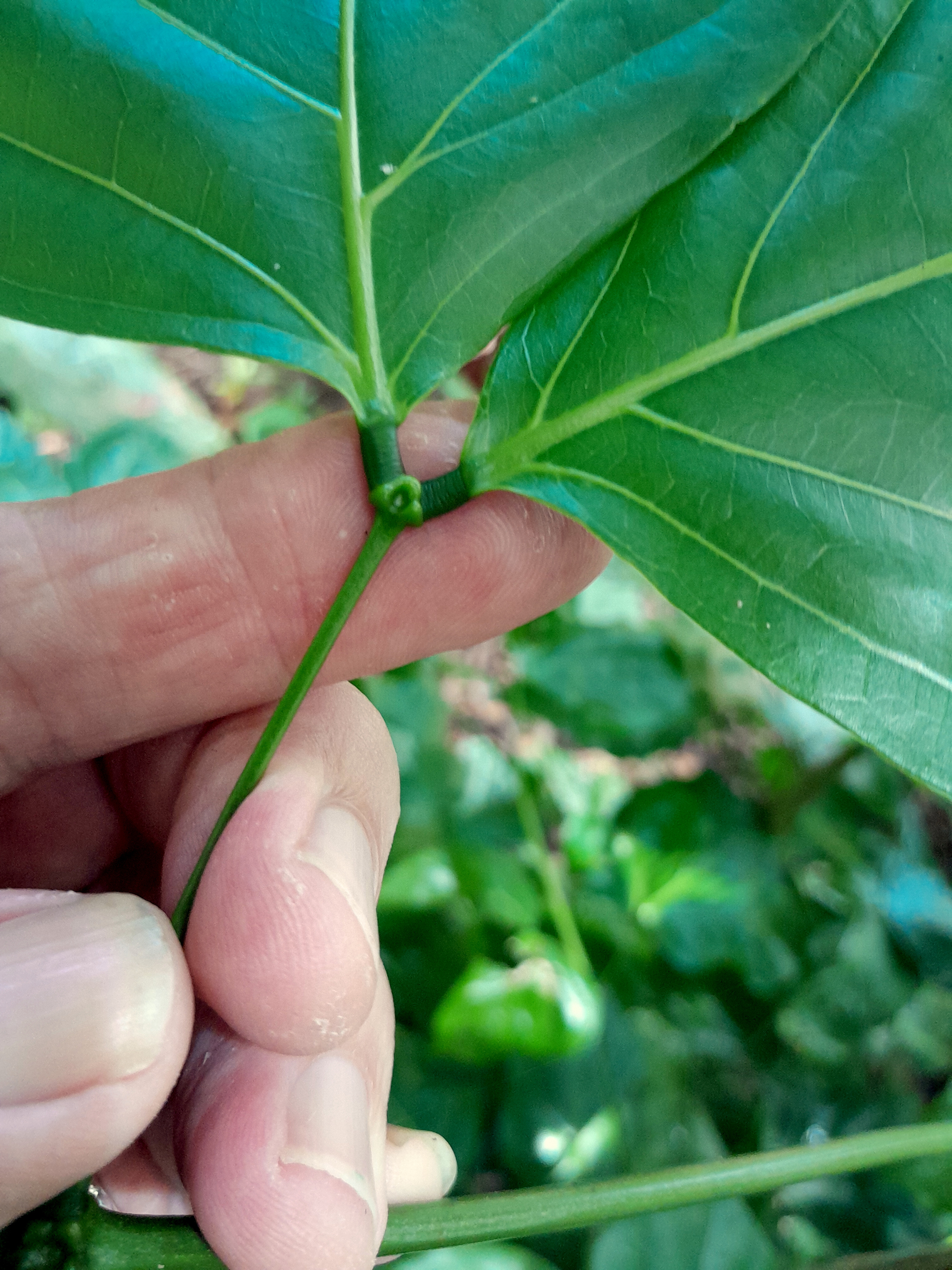
Sunken gland on the rachis, an identification feature
