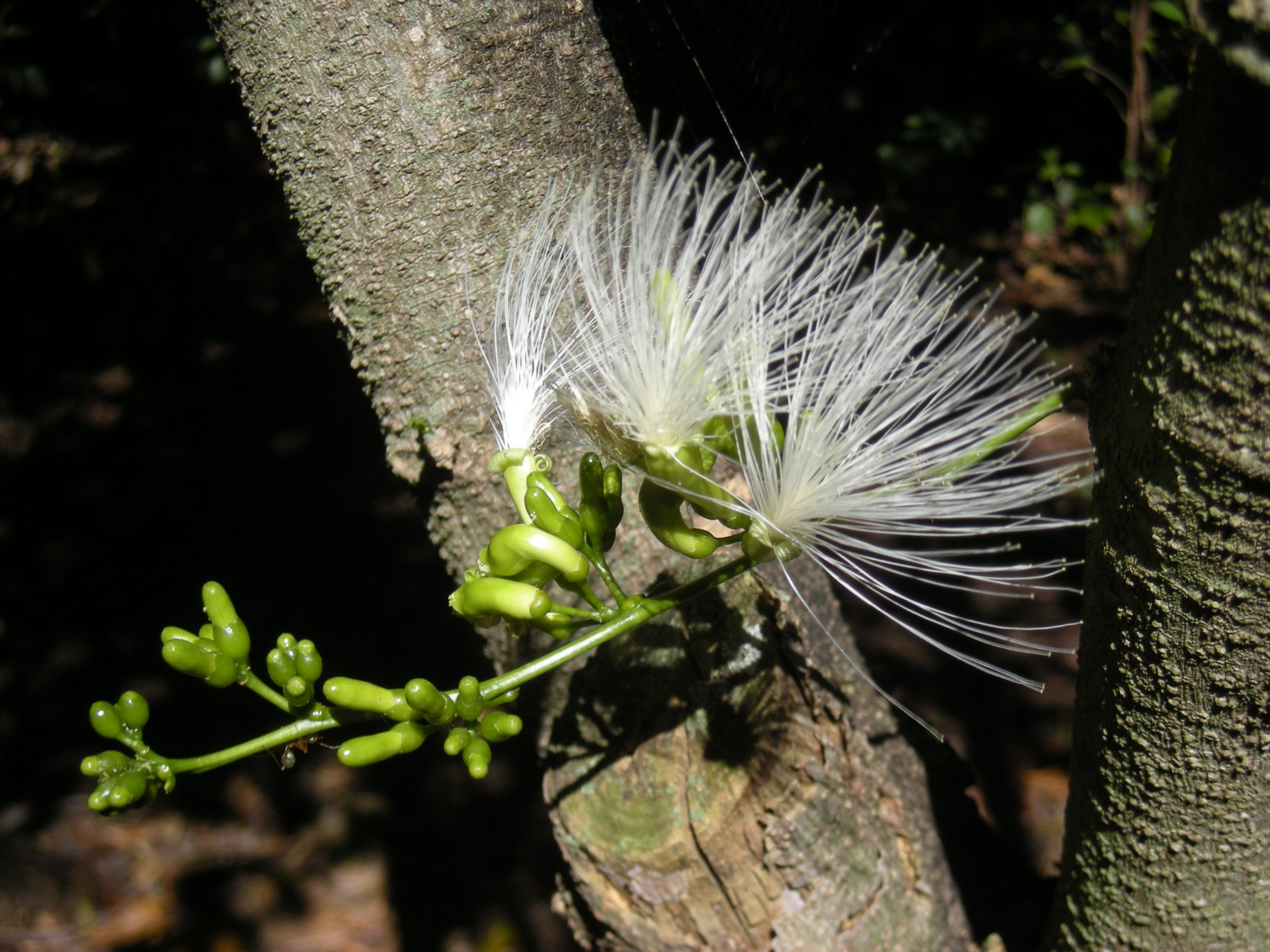
- Flowers

Conservation status
- Least Concern (NCA)

Scientific classification
- Kingdom: Plantae
- Clade: Embryophytes
- Clade: Tracheophytes
- Clade: Angiosperms
- Clade: Eudicots
- Clade: Rosids
- Order: Fabales
- Family: Fabaceae
- Subfamily: Caesalpinioideae
- Clade: Mimosoid clade
- Genus: Archidendron
- Species: A. lucyi

Binomial name
- Archidendron lucyi F.Muell.

Synonyms
- 13 synonyms: Affonsea lucyi (F.Muell.) Kuntze 1891; Albizia lucyi (F.Muell.) F.Muell. 1888; Pithecellobium lucyi (F.Muell.) Mohlenbr. 1966; Archidendron chrysocarpum K.Schum. & Lauterb. 1900; Archidendron effeminatum de Wit 1942; Archidendron lucyi var. schlechteri (Harms) de Wit 1952; Archidendron papuanum Merr. & L.M.Perry 1942; Archidendron peekelii Lauterb. 1911; Archidendron schlechteri Harms 1917; Archidendron sogerense Baker f. 1923; Archidendron solomonense Hemsl. 1903; Pithecellobium chrysocarpum (K.Schum. & Lauterb.) Mohlenbr. 1966; Pithecellobium solomonense (Hemsl.) Mohlenbr. 1966

= Archidendron lucyi =

Species of flowering plant

Archidendron lucyi is a small tree in the legume family Fabaceae. The native range extends from eastern Malesia to the Solomon Islands and northeastern Australia. A. lucyi grows in the understorey of lowland rainforest.

As with other members of the genus, A. lucyi produces large pinnate leaves. The species is cauliflorous, producing flowers directly from the trunk. The cream-coloured stamens are 3–5 cm (1.2–2.0 in) long and form the showiest part of the flowers. The flowers are followed by highly conspicuous red or orange seed pods, which split open when ripe to reveal black seeds.

== Taxonomy ==
This species was first described by German-born Australian botanist Ferdinand von Mueller, based on material collected by John Dallachy near Rockingham Bay in northeast Queensland. It was published in his book Fragmenta phytographiæ Australiæ in 1868. Various other specimens of this species have subsequently been collected and described as new by other botanists, with the result that there are now 3 homotypic and 10 heterotypic synonyms for the taxon.

== Gallery ==
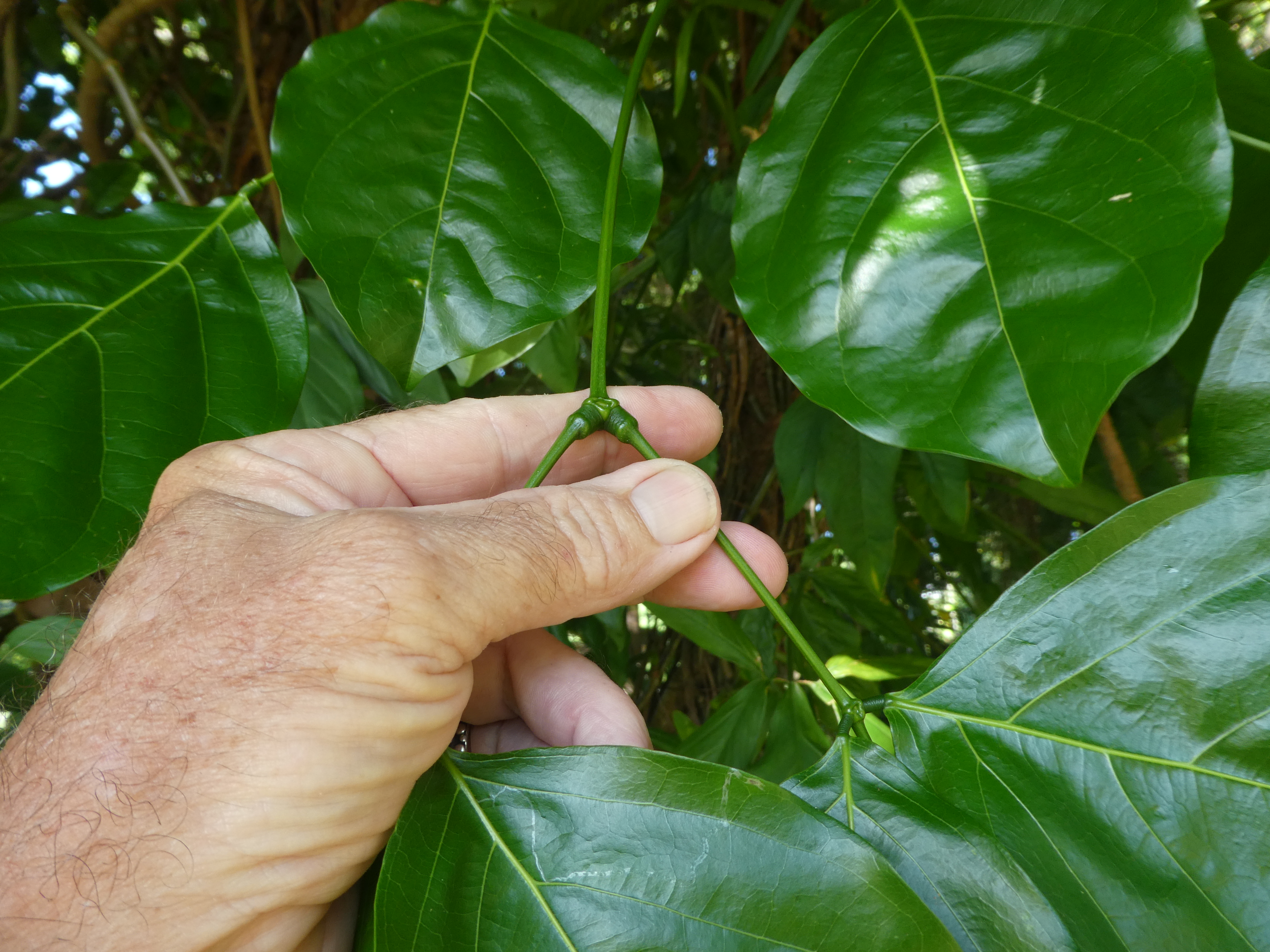
Foliage

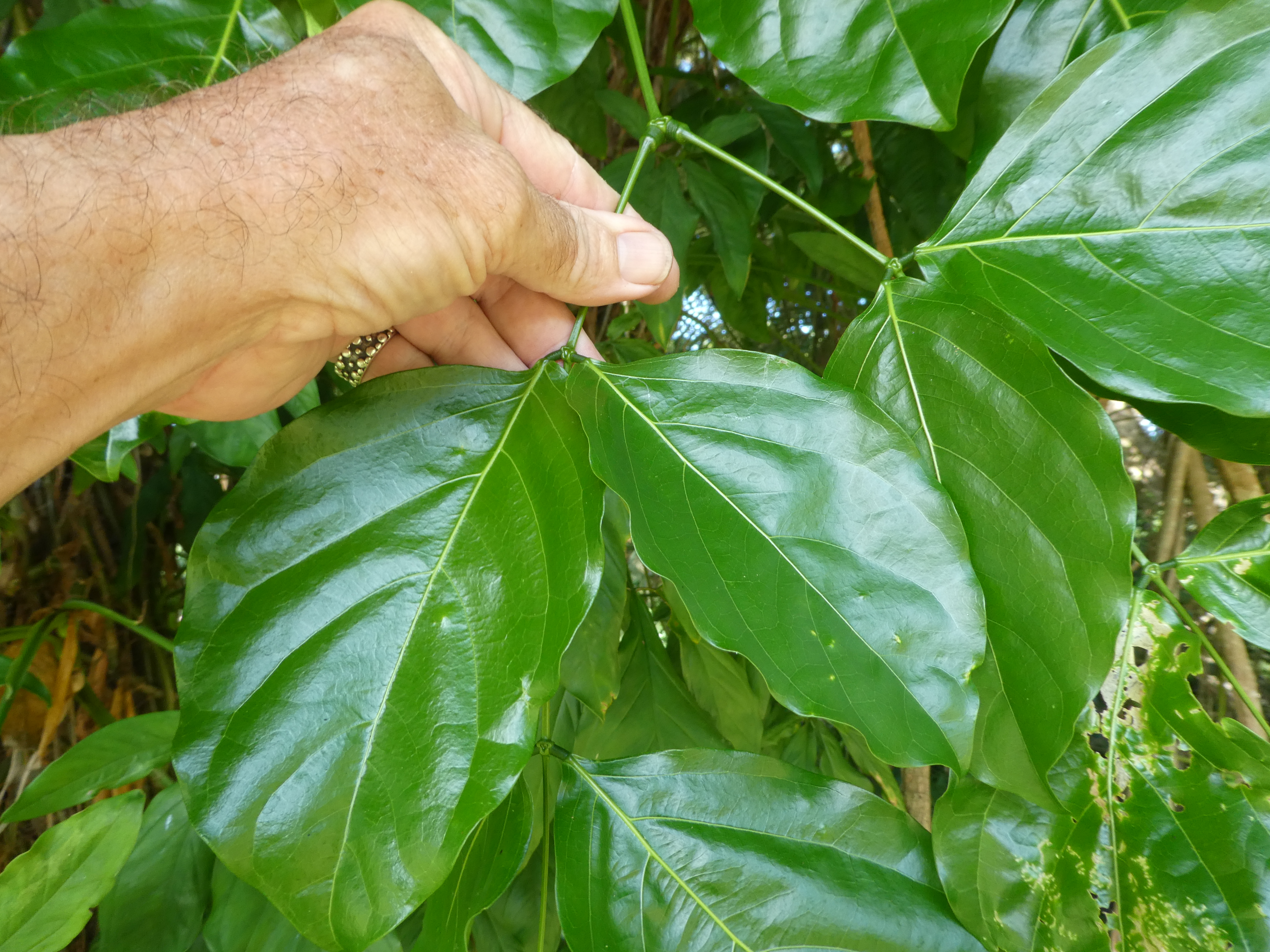

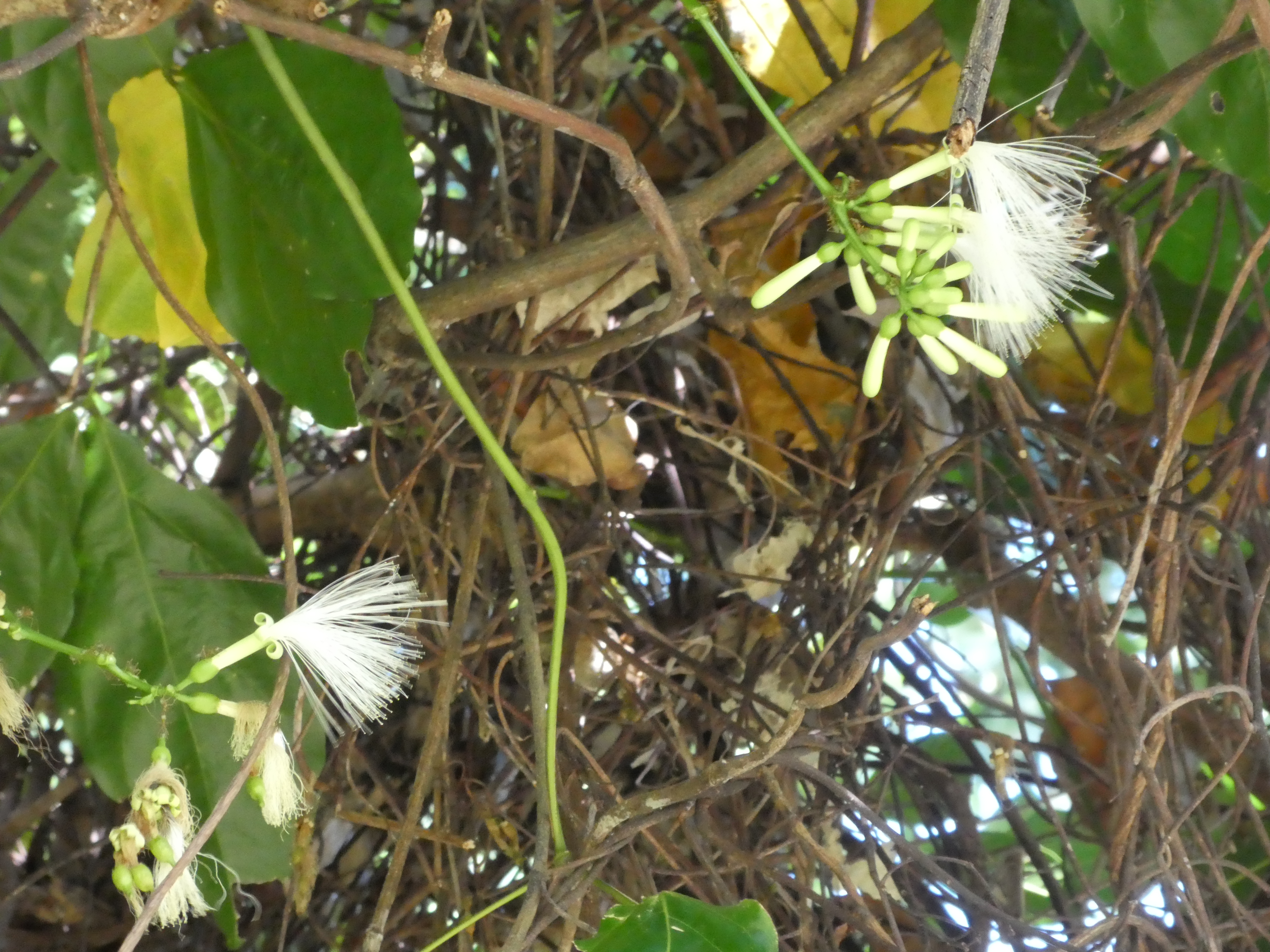
Flowers and buds

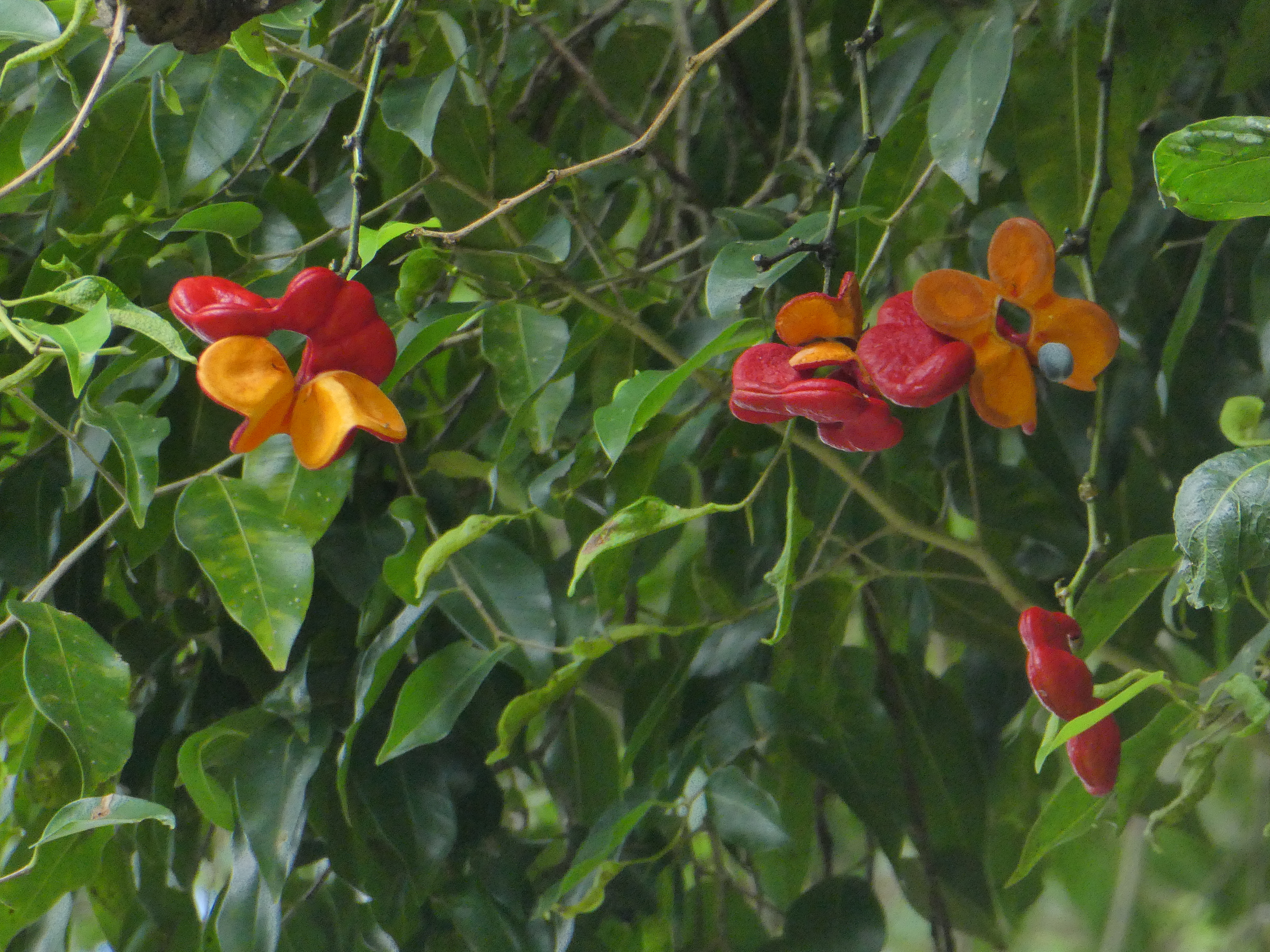
Fruit and seeds

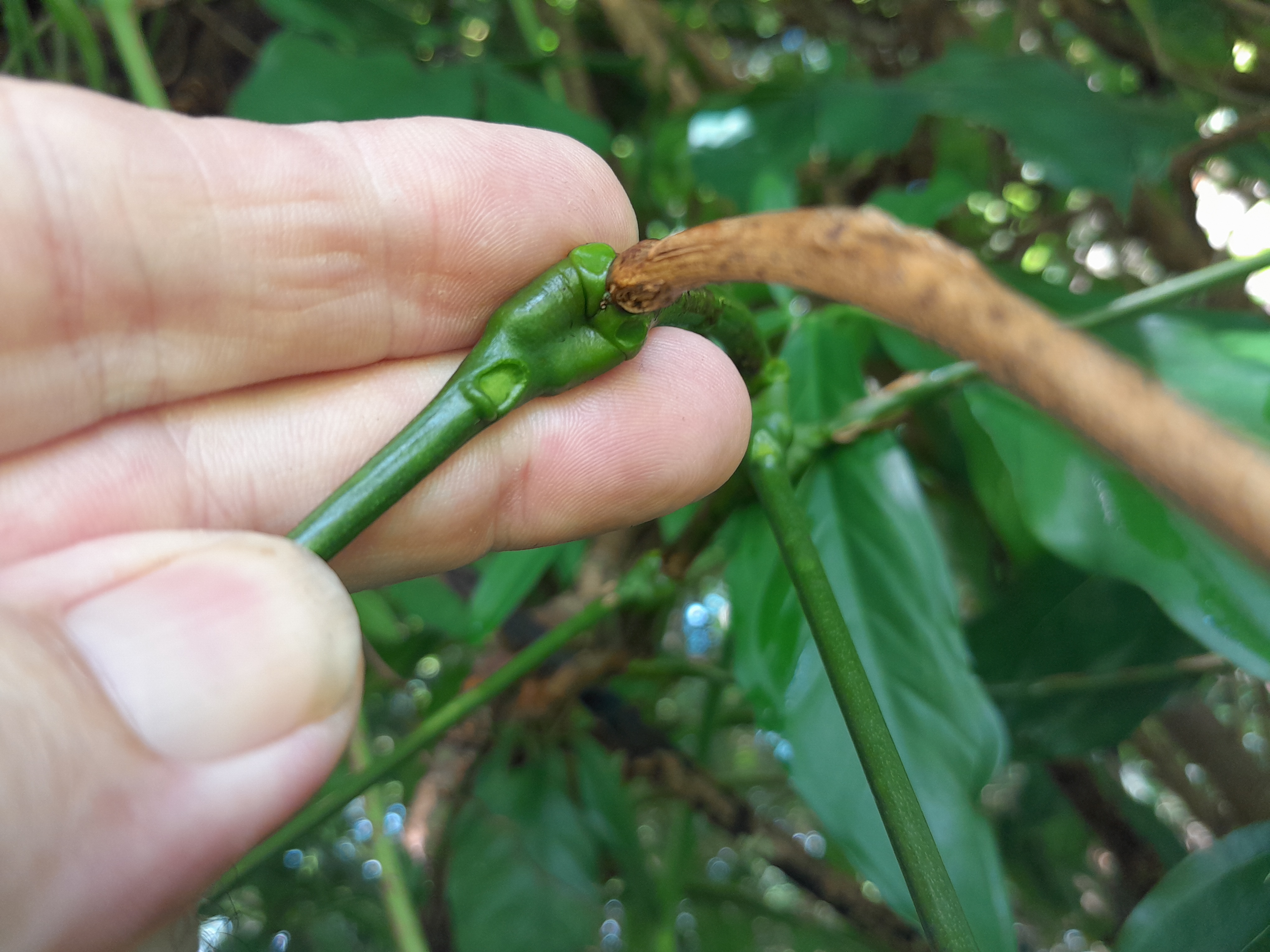
Base of the petiole
