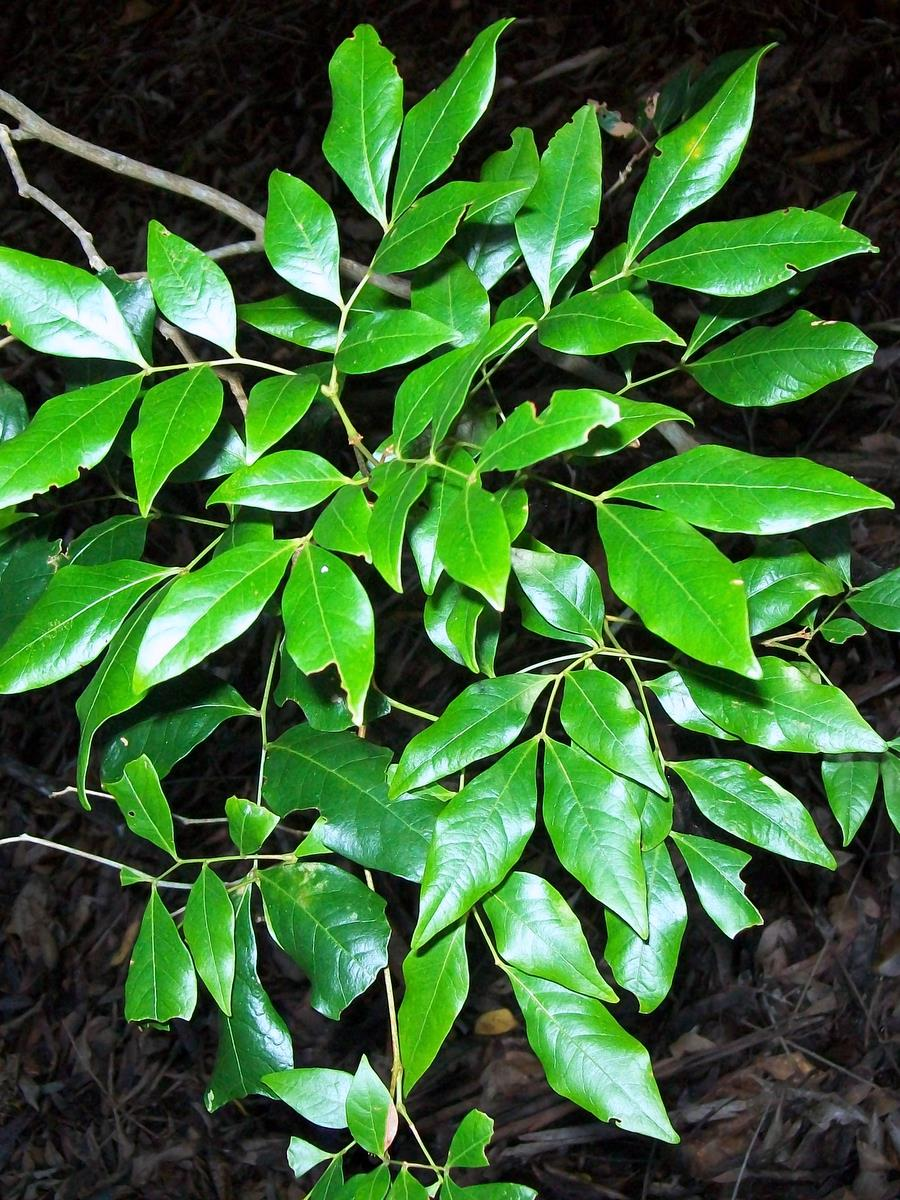

Scientific classification
- Kingdom: Plantae
- Clade: Embryophytes
- Clade: Tracheophytes
- Clade: Spermatophytes
- Clade: Angiosperms
- Clade: Eudicots
- Clade: Rosids
- Order: Fabales
- Family: Fabaceae
- Subfamily: Caesalpinioideae
- Clade: Mimosoid clade
- Genus: Archidendron
- Species: A. muellerianum

Binomial name
- Archidendron muellerianum (Maiden & R.T.Baker) I.C.Nielsen

Synonyms
- Pithecellobium muelleriana (Maiden & R.T.Baker) Maiden & Betche; Abarema muelleriana (Maiden & R.T.Baker) Kosterm

= Archidendron muellerianum =

Species of legume

Archidendron muellerianum, the veiny lace flower or small-flower laceflower, is a rainforest tree with a restricted range in eastern Australia. It is a rare plant, with a ROTAP rating of 3RCa.

The tree was first described as Albizia muelleriana in 1896 by Joseph Maiden and Richard Thomas Baker, before being moved to its current binomial name by Nielsen. The specific epithet muellerianum honours the name of one of Australia's outstanding colonial botanists, Ferdinand von Mueller.

Archidendron muellerianum grows as a tree up to 20 metres (66 feet) tall. The trunk has grey bark and can reach diameter of 60 cm (23.5 in), and is occasionally buttressed. The leaves are arranged alternately on the grey to red-brown branches and are bipinnate, made up of two leaf stalks each with several oval-shaped glossy leaflets, which measure 4–13 cm (1.5–5 in) long, and 2–5 cm (1–2 in) wide. The leaflets have prominent veins on both upper and undersurfaces. Appearing in November and December, the tiny white flowers are arranged in globular white flower heads to 2.5 cm (1.0 in) in diameter. Flowering is followed by 10–13 cm (4–5 in) long wrinkled red-brown seed pods, which ripen in April to December. Orange on the inside, they bear shiny black seeds.

It grows north from Alstonville, New South Wales up to some of the remnant natural areas in the Gold Coast in south-eastern Queensland, in coastal or subtropical rainforest. The former habitat of seaside and subtropical rainforest was mostly destroyed for agriculture and housing.
