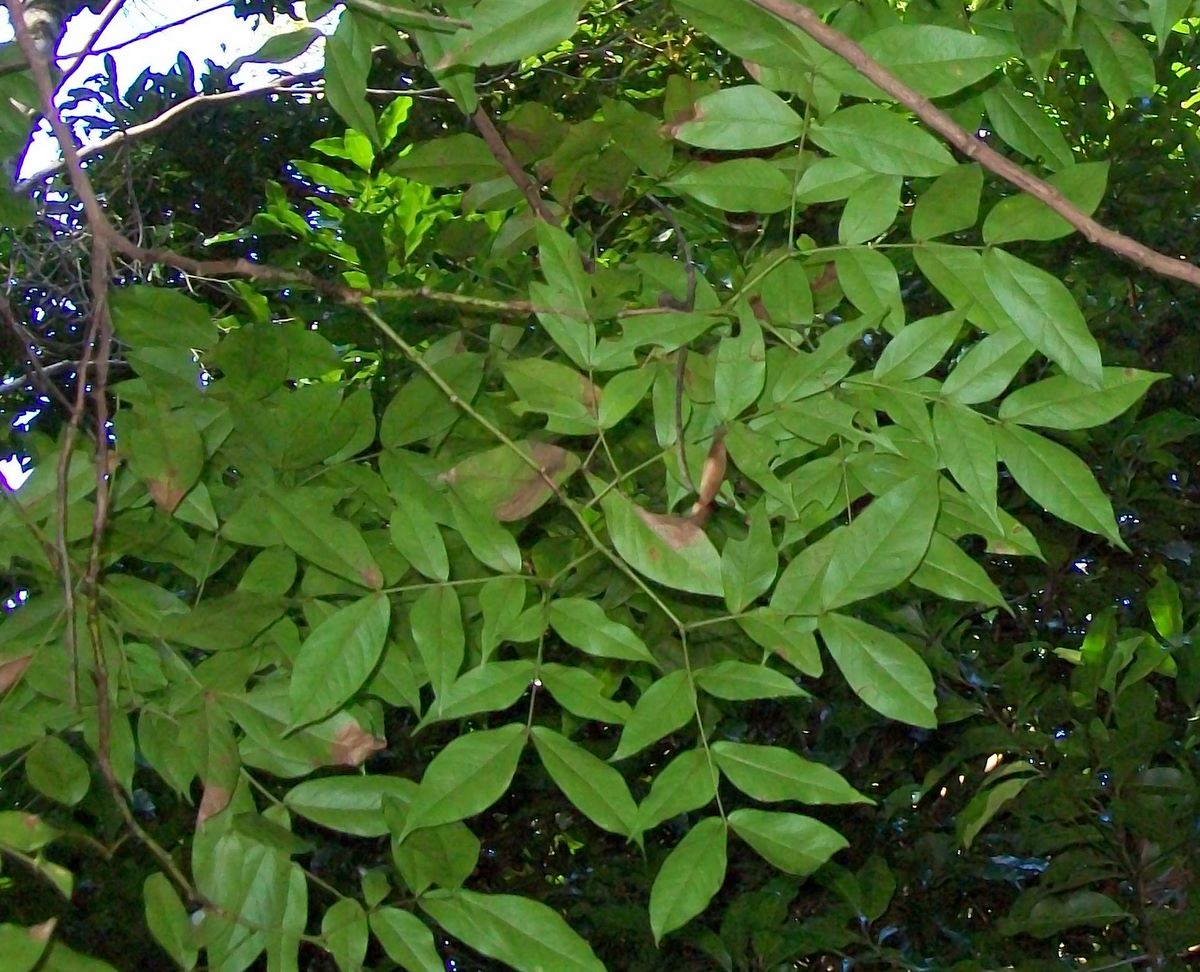

Conservation status
- Vulnerable (EPBC Act)

Scientific classification
- Kingdom: Plantae
- Clade: Embryophytes
- Clade: Tracheophytes
- Clade: Spermatophytes
- Clade: Angiosperms
- Clade: Eudicots
- Clade: Rosids
- Order: Fabales
- Family: Fabaceae
- Subfamily: Caesalpinioideae
- Clade: Mimosoid clade
- Genus: Archidendron
- Species: A. hendersonii

Binomial name
- Archidendron hendersonii (F.Muell.) & I.C.Nielsen

Synonyms
- Pithecellobium hendersonii F.Muell.; Abarema hendersonii (F.Muell.) Kosterm.

= Archidendron hendersonii =

Species of legume

Archidendron hendersonii, the white lace flower or tulip siris, is a rainforest tree in eastern Australia. A rare plant, listed as vulnerable, it is named after J.A. Henderson, who collected the original specimen at Ballina.

It grows north from the Richmond River, New South Wales up to Cape Melville in tropical Queensland.

The tree grows up to 18 metres tall with a trunk diameter of 60 cm. Its former habitat of riverine and lowland sub-tropical rainforest in New South Wales is mostly destroyed for housing and agriculture.
