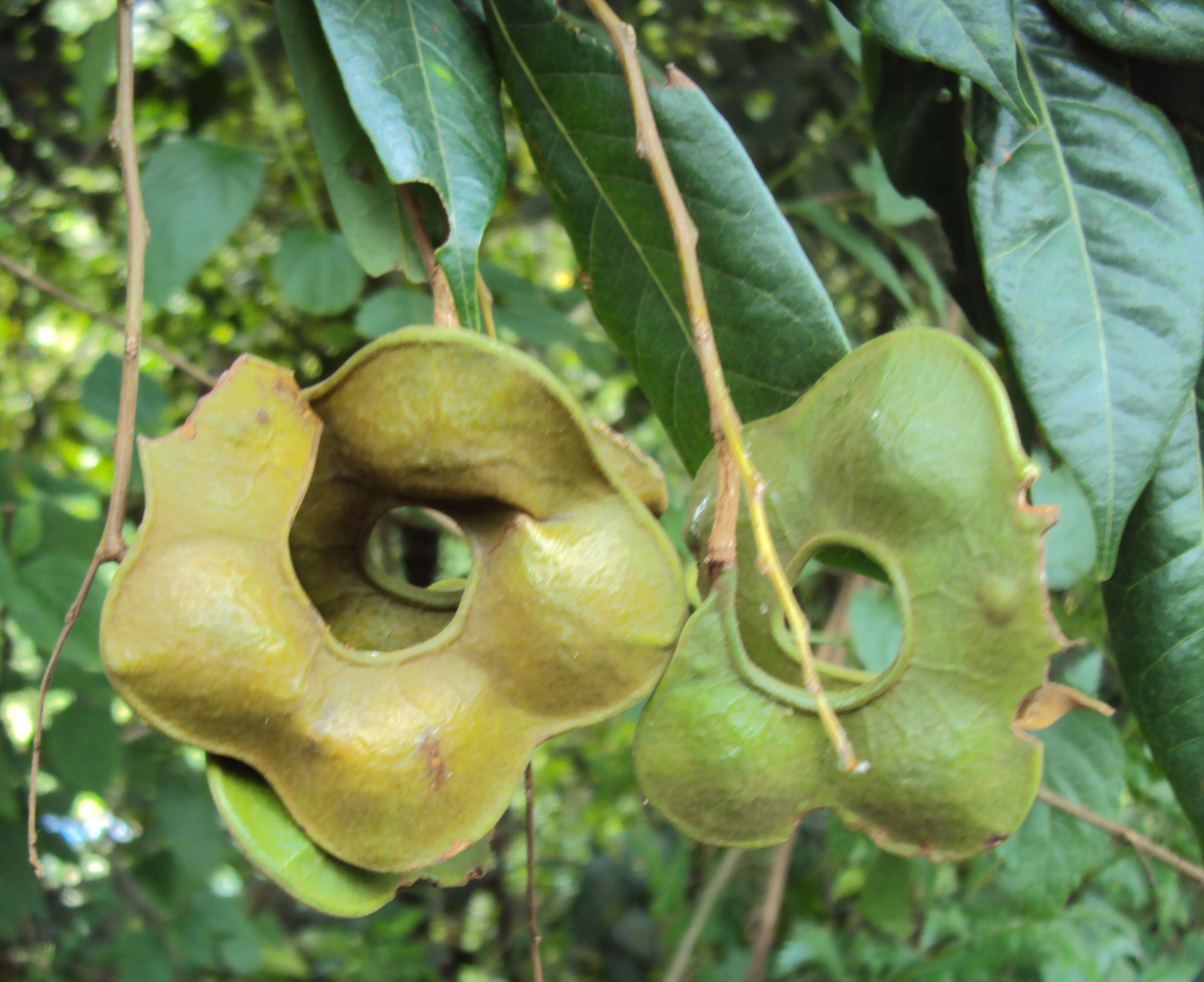
- Fruit of Archidendron bigeminum

Conservation status
- Vulnerable (IUCN 2.3)

Scientific classification
- Kingdom: Plantae
- Clade: Tracheophytes
- Clade: Angiosperms
- Clade: Eudicots
- Clade: Rosids
- Order: Fabales
- Family: Fabaceae
- Subfamily: Caesalpinioideae
- Clade: Mimosoid clade
- Genus: Archidendron
- Species: A. bigeminum

Binomial name
- Archidendron bigeminum (L.) I.C.Nielsen

Synonyms
- Numerous, see text

= Archidendron bigeminum =

Species of legume

Archidendron bigeminum is a tree species in the legume family (Fabaceae). It is found in India and Sri Lanka. It is known as "kalitiya - කලටිය" in Sinhala.

The World Conservation Monitoring Centre (WCMC) in the 1998 IUCN Redlist reviewed Abarema bigemina and Pithecellobium gracile as Vulnerable species. These are nowadays both considered junior synonyms of Archidendron bigeminum. It may be that the Indian population consists of a smaller-growing variety than that on Sri Lanka.

== Synonyms ==
The complete list of junior synonyms is:

- Abarema abeywickramae Kosterm.
- Abarema bigemina (L.) Kosterm.
- Abarema monadelpha (Roxb.) Kosterm.
- Abarema monadelpha (Roxb.) Kosterm. var. gracile (Bedd.) Kosterm.
- Archidendron monadelphum (Roxb.) I.C.Nielsen
- Archidendron monadelphum (Roxb.) I.C.Nielsen var. gracile (Bedd.) Sanjappa
- Inga bigemina (L.) Willd.
- Mimosa bigemina L.
- Mimosa monadelpha Roxb.
- Pithecellobium bigeminum (L.) Mart.
- Pithecellobium bigemium (L.) Mart.
- Pithecellobium gracile Bedd.
- Pithecellobium nicobaricum Prain

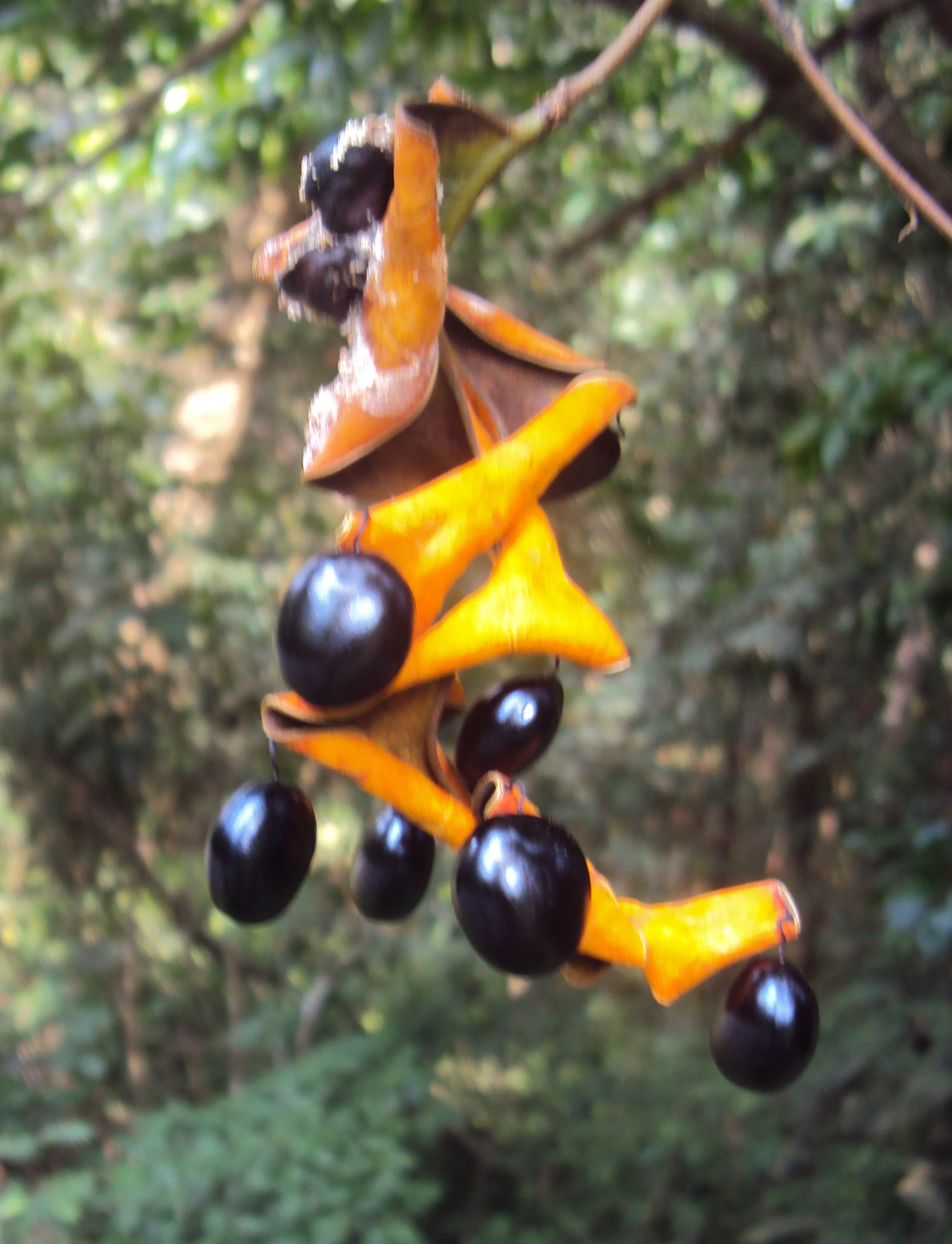
Seed of Archidendron bigeminum
