= Archidendron pahangense =

Conservation status
- Conservation Dependent (IUCN 2.3)

Scientific classification
- Kingdom: Plantae
- Clade: Tracheophytes
- Clade: Angiosperms
- Clade: Eudicots
- Clade: Rosids
- Order: Fabales
- Family: Fabaceae
- Subfamily: Caesalpinioideae
- Clade: Mimosoid clade
- Genus: Archidendron
- Species: A. pahangense

Binomial name
- Archidendron pahangense (Kosterm.) Nielsen

Species of legume

Archidendron pahangense is a species of legume in the family Fabaceae. It is a tree endemic to Peninsular Malaysia. It is threatened by habitat loss.
