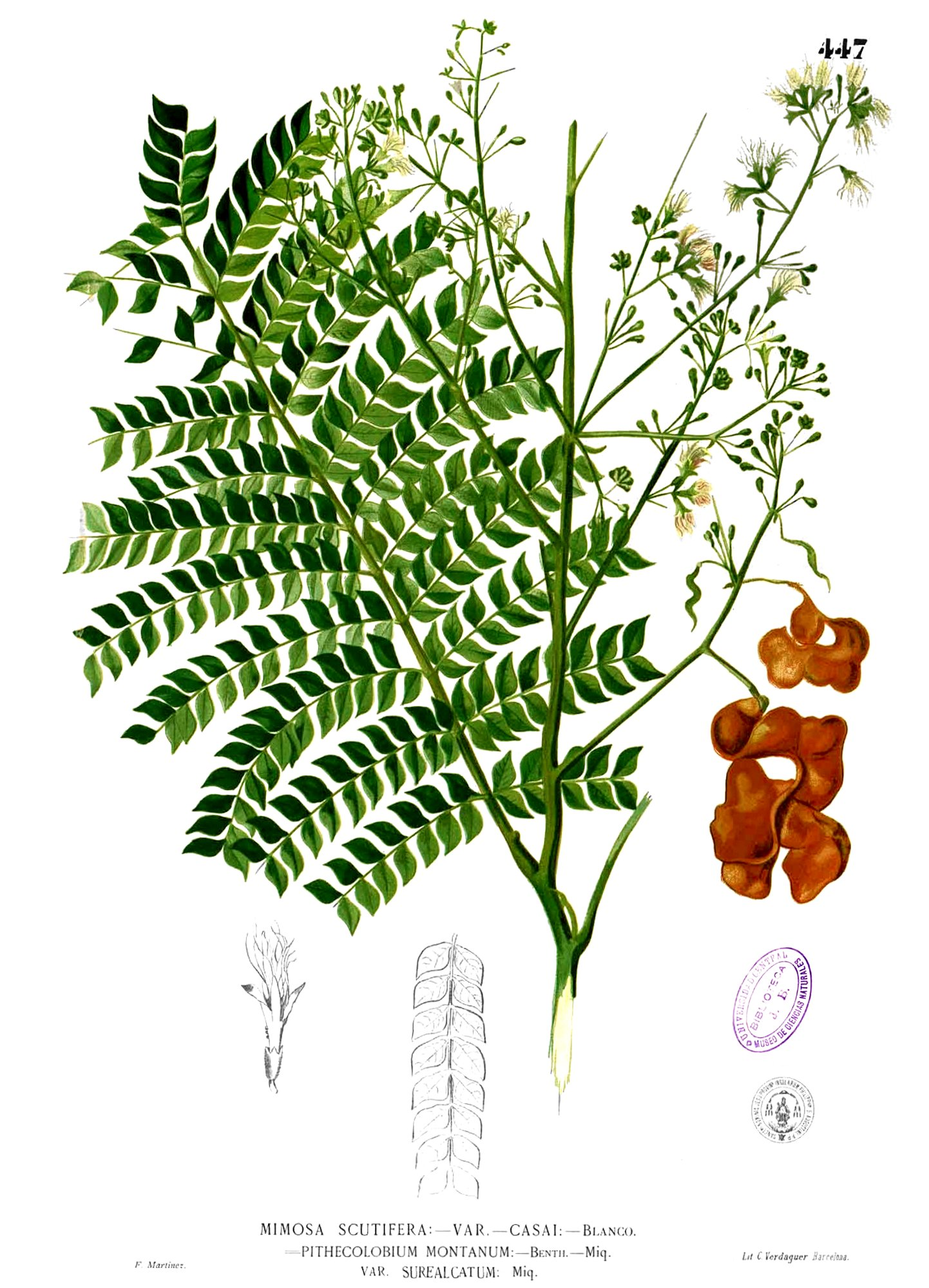
- Archidendron scutiferum

Scientific classification
- Kingdom: Plantae
- Clade: Tracheophytes
- Clade: Angiosperms
- Clade: Eudicots
- Clade: Rosids
- Order: Fabales
- Family: Fabaceae
- Subfamily: Caesalpinioideae
- Clade: Mimosoid clade
- Genus: Archidendron; F.Muell.

Type species
- Archidendron vaillantii (F.Muell.) F.Muell.

Species
- See text

Synonyms
- Cylindrokelupha Kosterm.; Hansemannia K.Schum.; Morolobium Kosterm.; Ortholobium Gagnep.; Paralbizzia Kosterm.; Torcula Noronha

= Archidendron =

Genus of flowering plants

Archidendron is a genus of flowering plants in the Mimosa subfamily (Mimosoideae) of the pea family, Fabaceae. It includes 98 species which range from India through Indochina, southern China, Taiwan, Malesia, and Papuasia to Queensland and New South Wales.

== Description ==
Plants in this genus are shrubs or small to medium-sized trees up to 30 metres (98 ft) tall; they have bipinnate leaves, extrafloral nectaries, and without spines or thorns. Leaflets are usually arranged in opposite pairs. The genus is morphologically diverse in the characters of leaves, flowers and fruit. Inflorescence position may be axillary, terminal, ramiflorous or cauliflorous. The form may be a 'head' or capitulum, an umbel, a raceme or a panicle. Flowers may be bell-shaped or tubular, the calyx and the corolla tube both 5-lobed. There are numerous stamens and one to several carpels. The fruit is a pod which may be flat, cylindrical, or twisted.

== Species ==
As of December 2024, Plants of the World Online accepts the following 98 species, while another 20 species are yet to be formally described.

- Archidendron alatum Pulle ex de Wit
- Archidendron alternifoliolatum (T.L.Wu) I.C.Nielsen
- Archidendron apoense (Elmer) I.C.Nielsen
- Archidendron arborescens (Kosterm.) I.C.Nielsen
- Archidendron aruense (Warb.) de Wit
- Archidendron arunachalense S.S.Dash & Sanjappa
- Archidendron balansae (Oliv.) I.C.Nielsen
- Archidendron bauchei (Gagnep.) I.C.Nielsen
- Archidendron beguinii de Wit
- Archidendron bellum Harms
- Archidendron bigeminum (L.) I.C.Nielsen
- Archidendron borneense (Benth.) I.C.Nielsen
- Archidendron brachycarpum Harms
- Archidendron brevicalyx Harms
- Archidendron brevipes (K.Schum.) de Wit
- Archidendron bubalinum (Jack) I.C.Nielsen
- Archidendron calliandrum de Wit
- Archidendron calycinum Pulle
- Archidendron chevalieri (Kosterm.) I.C.Nielsen
- Archidendron clypearia (Jack) I.C.Nielsen
  - subsp. subcoriaceum (Thwaites) I.C.Nielsen
- Archidendron cockburnii I.C.Nielsen
- Archidendron conspicuum (Craib) I.C.Nielsen
- Archidendron contortum (Mart.) I.C.Nielsen
- Archidendron cordifolium (T.L.Wu) I.C.Nielsen
- Archidendron crateradenum (Kosterm.) I.C.Nielsen
- Archidendron dalatense (Kosterm.) I.C.Nielsen
- Archidendron eberhardtii I.C.Nielsen
- Archidendron ellipticum (Blume) I.C.Nielsen
- Archidendron fagifolium (Blume ex Miq.) I.C.Nielsen
- Archidendron falcatum I.C.Nielsen
- Archidendron fallax Harms
- Archidendron forbesii Baker f.
- Archidendron glabrum (K.Schum.) K.Schum. & Lauterb.
- Archidendron glandulosum Mohlenbr. ex Verdc.
- Archidendron globosum (Blume) I.C.Nielsen
- Archidendron glomeriflorum (Kurz) I.C.Nielsen
- Archidendron gogolense (K.Schum. & Lauterb.) de Wit
- Archidendron grandiflorum (Benth.) I.C.Nielsen
- Archidendron harmsii Malm
- Archidendron havilandii (Ridl.) I.C.Nielsen
- Archidendron hendersonii (F.Muell.) I.C.Nielsen
- Archidendron hirsutum I.C.Nielsen
- Archidendron hispidum (Mohlenbr.) Verdc.
- Archidendron hooglandii Verdc.
- Archidendron jiringa (Jack) I.C.Nielsen
- Archidendron kalkmanii (Kosterm.) I.C.Nielsen
- Archidendron kanisii R.S.Cowan
- Archidendron kerrii (Gagnep.) I.C.Nielsen
- Archidendron kinabaluense (Kosterm.) I.C.Nielsen
- Archidendron kunstleri (Prain) I.C.Nielsen
- Archidendron laoticum (Gagnep.) I.C.Nielsen
- Archidendron lovelliae (F.M.Bailey) I.C.Nielsen
- Archidendron lucidum (Benth.) I.C.Nielsen
- Archidendron lucyi F.Muell.
- Archidendron megaphyllum Merr. & L.M.Perry
- Archidendron merrillii (J.F.Macbr.) I.C.Nielsen
- Archidendron microcarpum (Benth.) I.C.Nielsen
- Archidendron minahassae (Teijsm. & Binn. ex Koord.) I.C.Nielsen
- Archidendron molle (K.Schum.) de Wit
- Archidendron monopterum (Kosterm.) I.C.Nielsen
- Archidendron mucronatum Harms
- Archidendron muellerianum (Maiden & R.T.Baker) I.C.Nielsen
- Archidendron multifoliolatum (H.Q.Wen) T.L.Wu
- Archidendron muricarpum (Kosterm.) Verdc.
- Archidendron nervosum de Wit
- Archidendron nielsenianum S.S.Dash & Sanjappa
- Archidendron novoguineense (Merr. & L.M.Perry) I.C.Nielsen
- Archidendron occultatum (Gagnep.) I.C.Nielsen
- Archidendron oppositum (Miq.) I.C.Nielsen
- Archidendron pachycarpum (Warb.) de Wit
- Archidendron pahangense (Kosterm.) I.C.Nielsen
- Archidendron palauense (Kaneh.) I.C.Nielsen
- Archidendron parviflorum Pulle
- Archidendron pauciflorum (Benth.) I.C.Nielsen
- Archidendron pellitum (Gagnep.) I.C.Nielsen
- Archidendron poilanei (Kosterm.) I.C.Nielsen
- Archidendron ptenopum Verdc.
- Archidendron quocense (Pierre) I.C.Nielsen
- Archidendron ramiflorum (F.Muell.) Kosterm.
- Archidendron robinsonii (Gagnep.) I.C.Nielsen
- Archidendron royenii Kosterm.
- Archidendron rufescens Verdc.
- Archidendron sabahense I.C.Nielsen
- Archidendron scutiferum (Blanco) I.C.Nielsen
- Archidendron sessile (Scheff.) de Wit
- Archidendron syringifolium (Kosterm.) I.C.Nielsen
- Archidendron tenuiracemosum Kaneh. & Hatus.
- Archidendron tetraphyllum (Gagnep.) I.C.Nielsen
- Archidendron tjendana (Kosterm.) I.C.Nielsen
- Archidendron tonkinense I.C.Nielsen
- Archidendron trichophyllum (Kosterm.) I.C.Nielsen
- Archidendron trifoliolatum de Wit
- Archidendron triplinervium (Kosterm.) I.C.Nielsen
- Archidendron turgidum (Merr.) I.C.Nielsen
- Archidendron utile (Chun & F.C.How) I.C.Nielsen
- Archidendron vaillantii (F.Muell.) F.Muell.
- Archidendron whitei I.C.Nielsen
- Archidendron xichouense (C.Chen & H.Sun) X.Y.Zhu

== Gallery ==
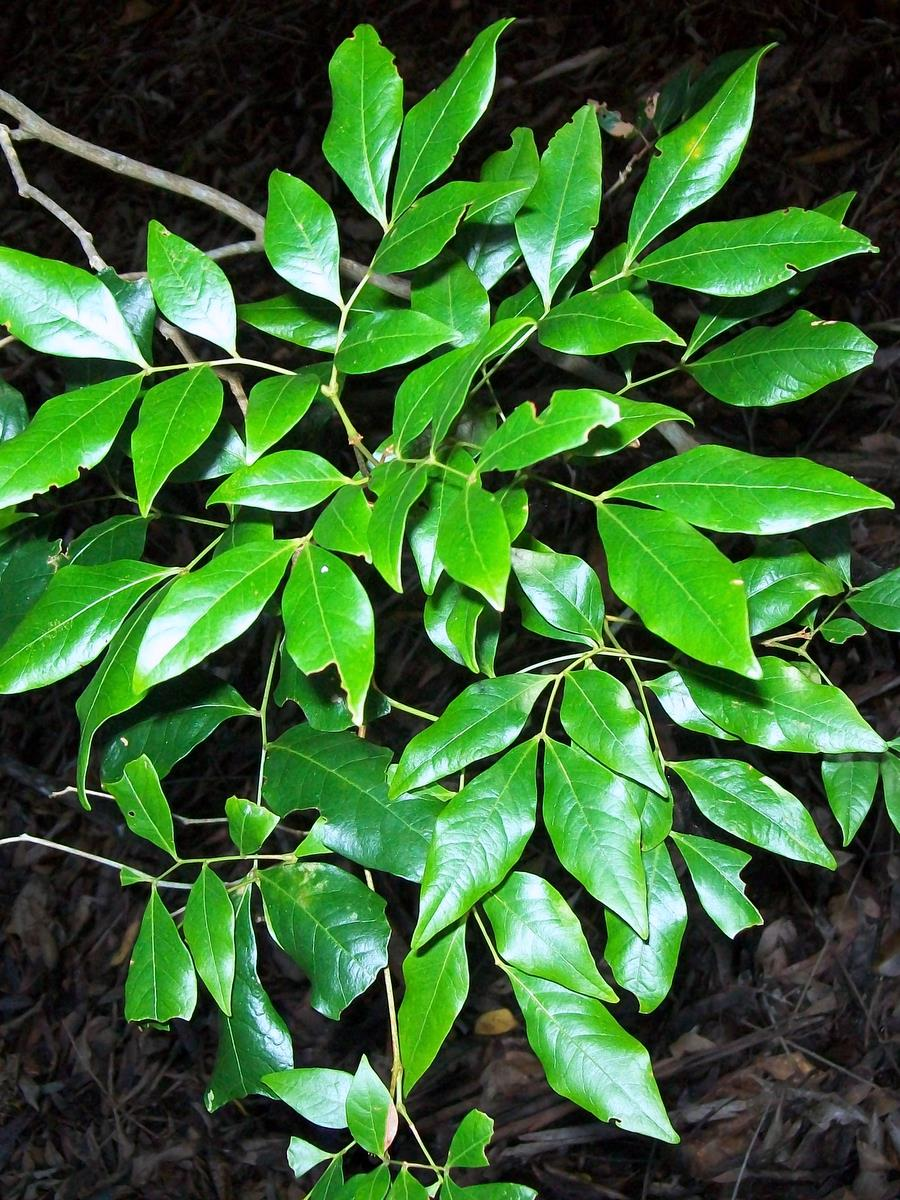
A. muellerianum foliage

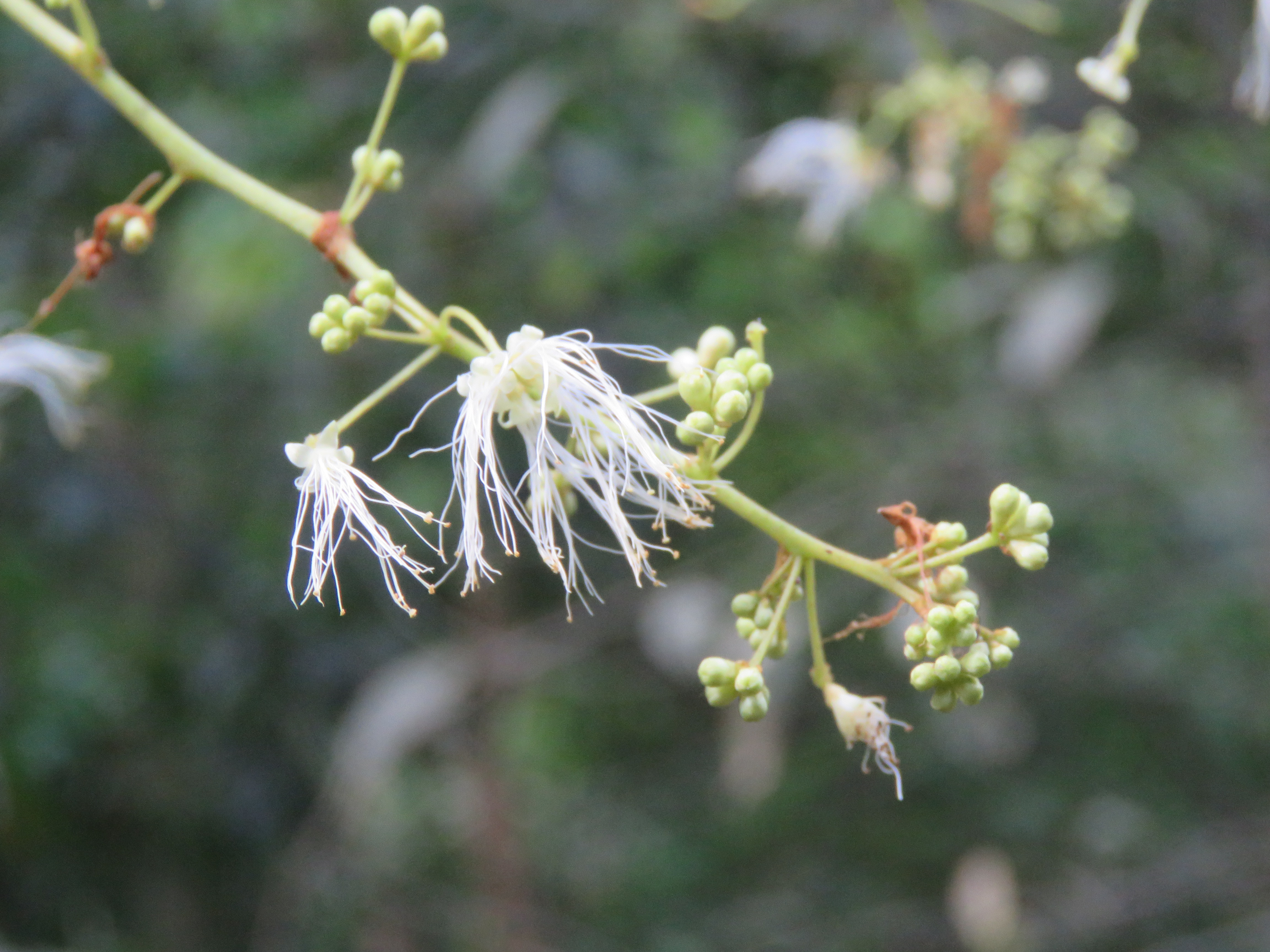
A. bigeminum flowers

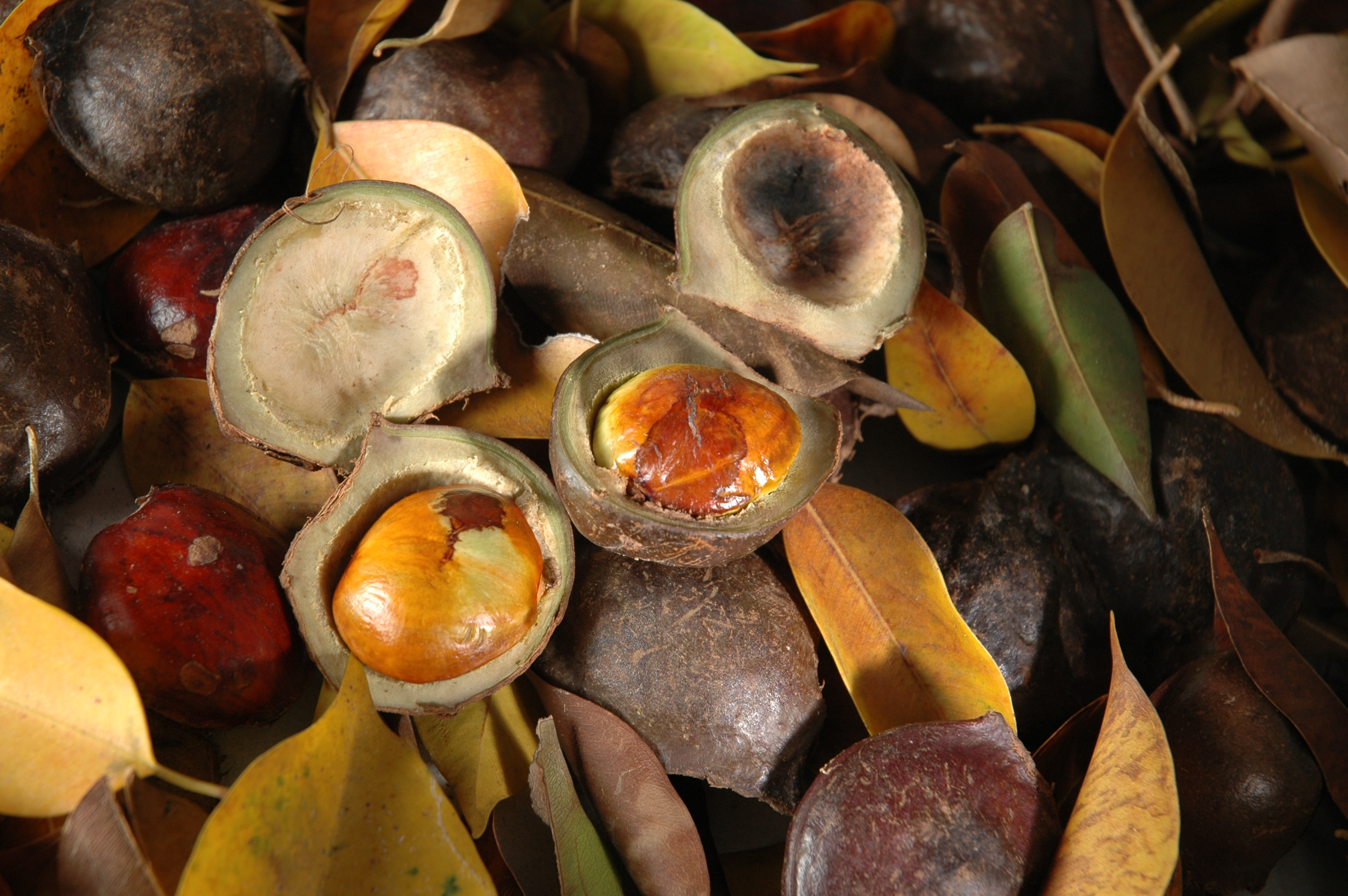
A. pauciflorum seeds

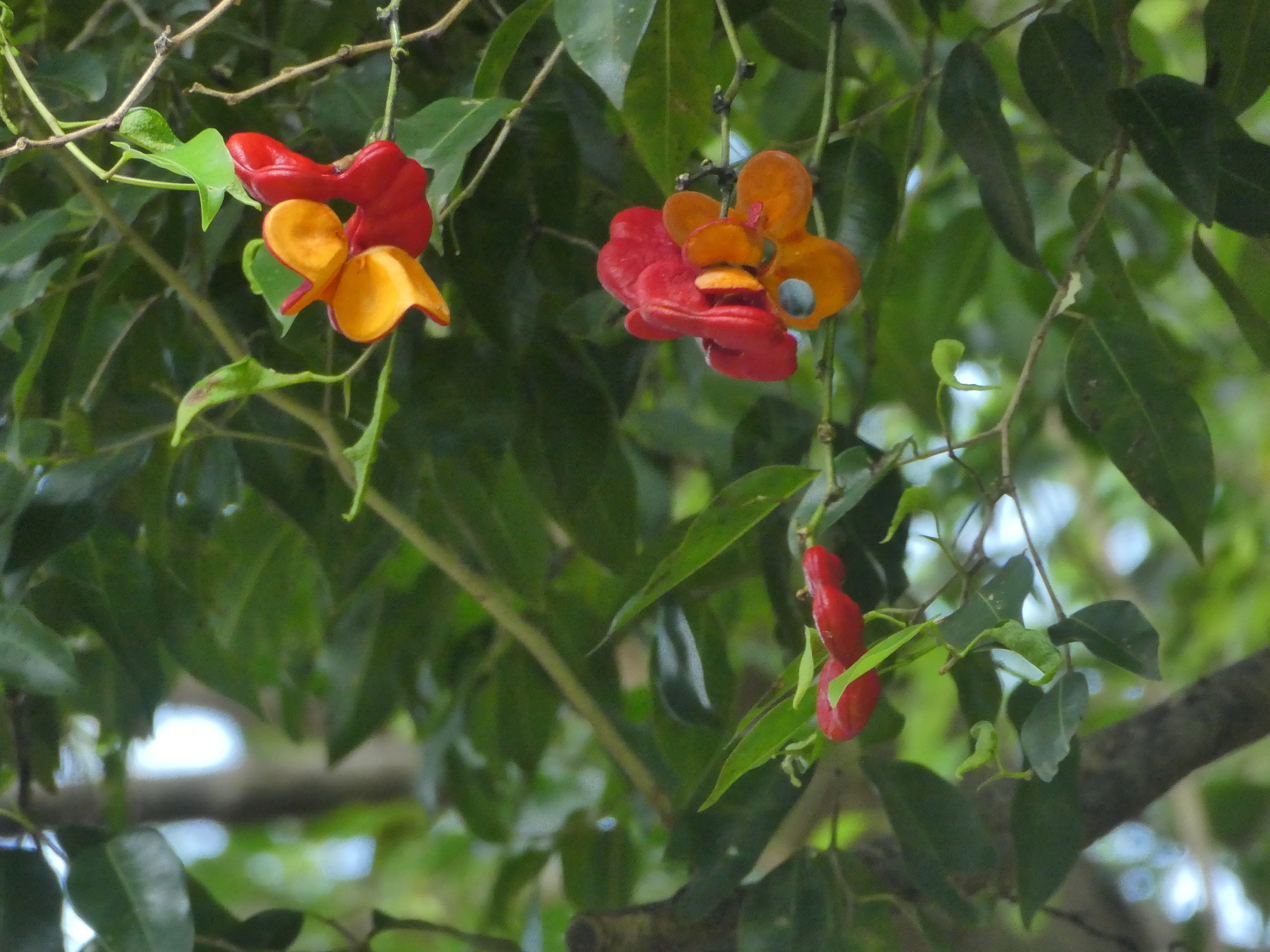
A. lucyi seed pods

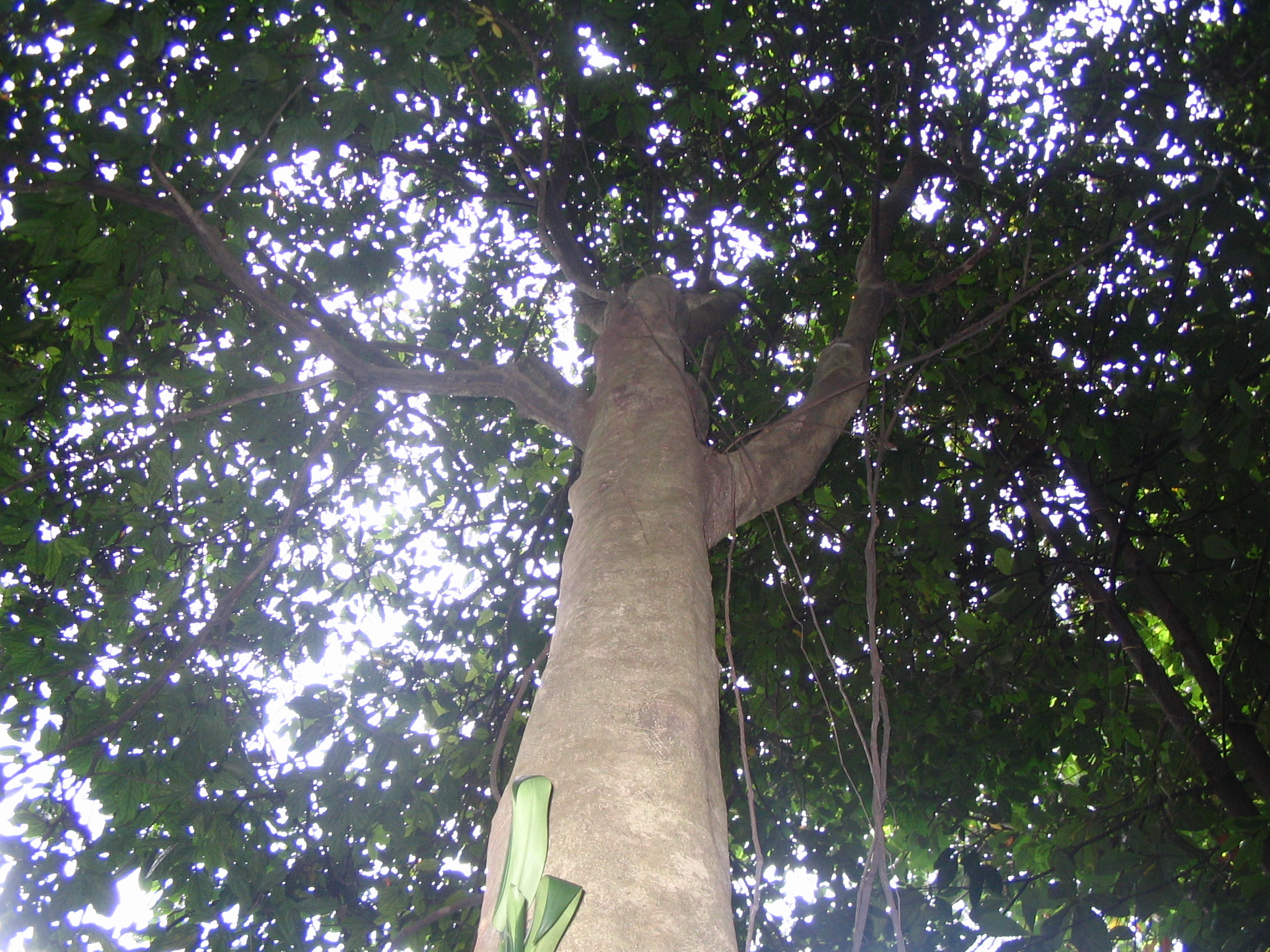
A. bulbalinum trunk
