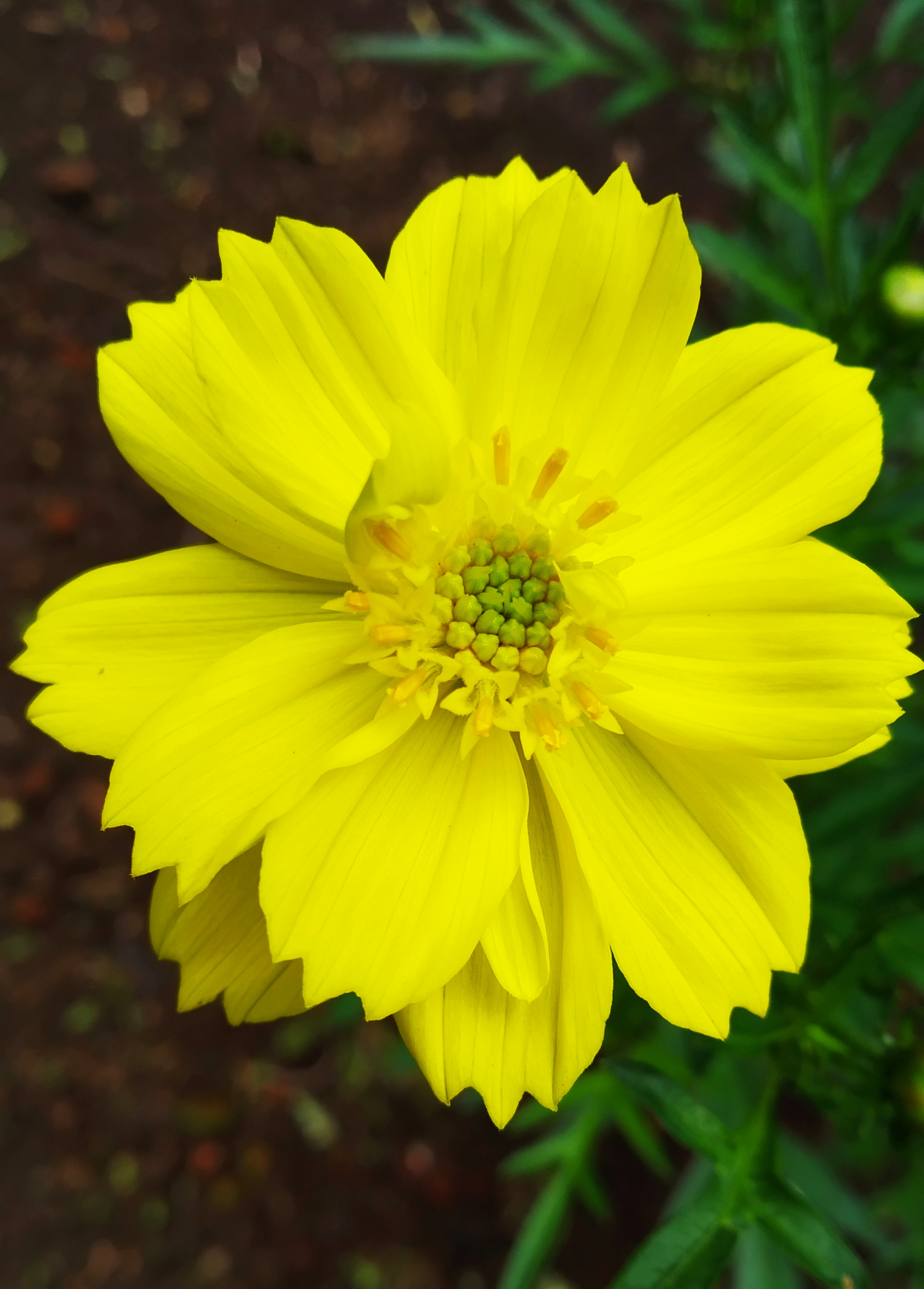

Scientific classification
- Kingdom: Plantae
- Clade: Tracheophytes
- Clade: Angiosperms
- Clade: Eudicots
- Clade: Asterids
- Order: Asterales
- Family: Asteraceae
- Genus: Cosmos
- Species: C. sulphureus

Binomial name
- Cosmos sulphureus Cav.

Synonyms
- Cosmos sulphureus var. exaristatus Sherff; Bidens sulphurea (Cav.) Sch.Bip.; Cosmos aurantiacus Klatt; Cosmos gracilis Sherff; Coreopsis artemisifolia Sessé & Moc.; Cosmea sulphurea (Cav.) Willd.; Bidens artemisiifolia f. grandiflora Kuntze; Bidens artemisiifolia subsp. intermedia Kuntze; Cosmos artemisiifolius (Jacq.) M.R.Almeida; Coreopsis artemisiifolia Jacq.; Cosmos sulphureus var. hirsuticaulis Sherff; Bidens artemisiifolia f. parviflora Kuntze; Bidens artemisiifolia var. rubra Kuntze; Bidens artemisiifolia f. rubra Kuntze; Bidens artemisiifolia (Jacq.) Kuntze; Bidens sulfurea (Cav.) Sch.Bip.

= Cosmos sulphureus =

Species of flowering plant in the daisy family

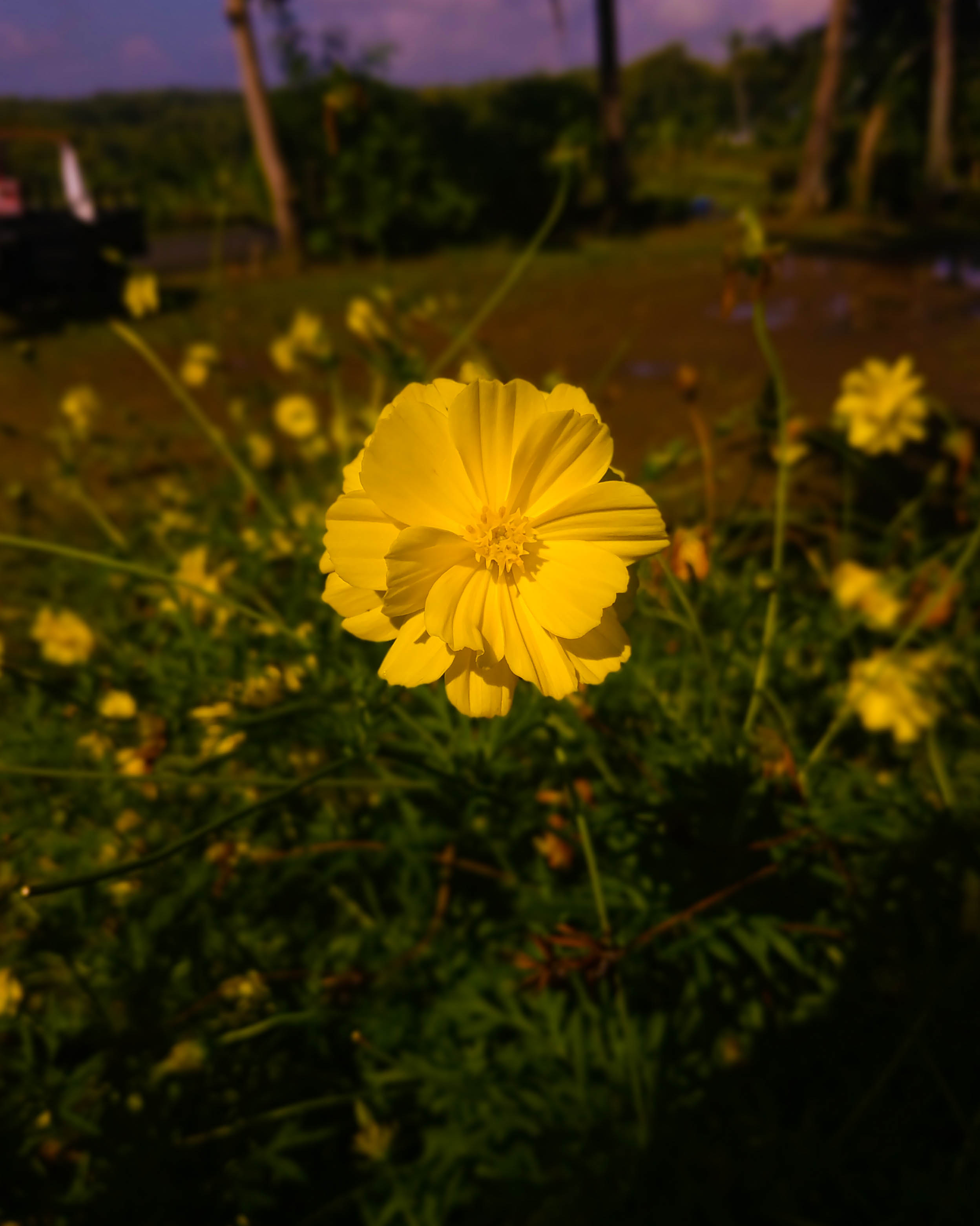
A Cosmos sp. at Yogyakarta region of Indonesia

Cosmos sulphureus is a species of flowering plant in the sunflower family Asteraceae, also known as sulfur cosmos and yellow cosmos. It is native to Mexico, Central America, and northern South America, and naturalized in other parts of North and South America as well as in Europe, Asia, and Australia. It was introduced into Asia from Mexico via the Manila-Acapulco galleon trade.

This plant was declared invasive by the United States Southeast Exotic Pest Plant Council in 1996. The flowers of all Cosmos attract birds and butterflies, including the monarch butterfly.

The original and its cultivars appear in shades of yellow, orange, and red. It is especially popular in Korea and Japan, where it is often seen in mass plantings along roadsides, following an initiative pursued by the Korean-Japanese botanist Woo Jang-choon.

== Description ==
This species of Cosmos is considered a half-hardy annual, although plants may re-appear via self-sowing for several years. Its foliage is opposite and pinnately divided. The plant height varies from 1–7 feet (30–210 cm).

== Cultivars ==
Cultivars include:

- 'Brightness Red' agm
- 'Bright Lights'
- 'Klondyke Mix', 'Polidor' consists of a variety of colors in shades from yellow to orange and scarlet
- 'Ladybird Dwarf Red', 'Ladybird Dwarf Gold', 'Ladybird Dwarf Orange', and 'Ladybird Dwarf Lemon' are shorter than the species at 40 cm. Their flowering is very early. The flowers have vibrant colors in hues of yellow, orange and scarlet. Another cultivar is named 'Bright Eyes'.
- 'The Diablo' reaches 75 cm with flowers of 5 cm intense orange red.
- 'The Polidor' reaches 75 cm and bears semi-double flowers in shades of golden yellow, orange and red.
- 'The Sunny Red' and 'Sunny Gold' have single flowers on stocky plants at 35 cm.
- 'The Sunset' reaches 90 cm. It bears double or semi-double flowers in shades of red or scarlet orange
- 'Tango' agm

(those marked agm have gained the Royal Horticultural Society's Award of Garden Merit).

== Cultivation ==
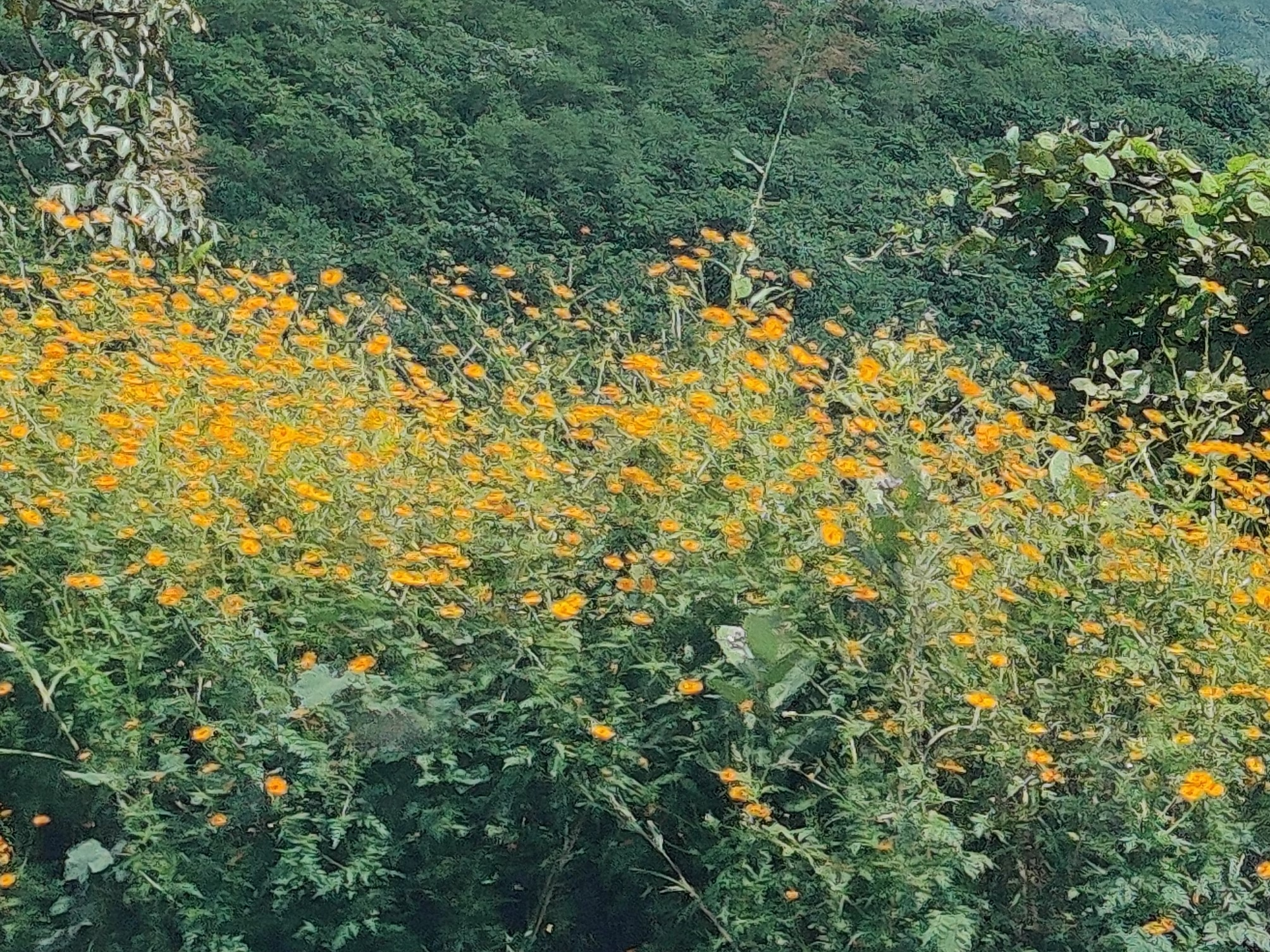
A patch of invasive Cosmos sulphureus plants in Pune district, India.

Growth characteristics of this plant include:

- Germination takes between 7 and 21 days at the optimal temperature of 75 degrees Fahrenheit; flowering begins between 50 and 60 days after germination
- It prefers a soil pH between 6.0 and 8.5, reflecting its native habitat in the alkaline regions of Central America
- Flowering is best in full sun, although partial shade is tolerated
- The plant is tolerant to drought after germination, and is seldom subject to insect or disease damage; this vigor is attested by its status as a pest in some areas of the United States

== Use ==
- The Sundanese of west Java in Indonesia eat its young shoots raw or cooked as a kind of lalab.
- The flowers are a dye, producing an orange-yellow dye, used in pre-Columbian America and later in southern Africa to dye wool.
- In Thailand, they are consumed in salads or herbal tea with the effect of inhibiting pancreatic lipase.
- According to a Pakistani team (2017), in rats subjected to a high dose of paracetamol, extract of the plant has a hepatoprotective effect.
- A Ukrainian publication (2017) attributes to a bread containing 10% dry extract of Cosmos sulphureus a good note for its organoleptic qualities.

== Gallery ==
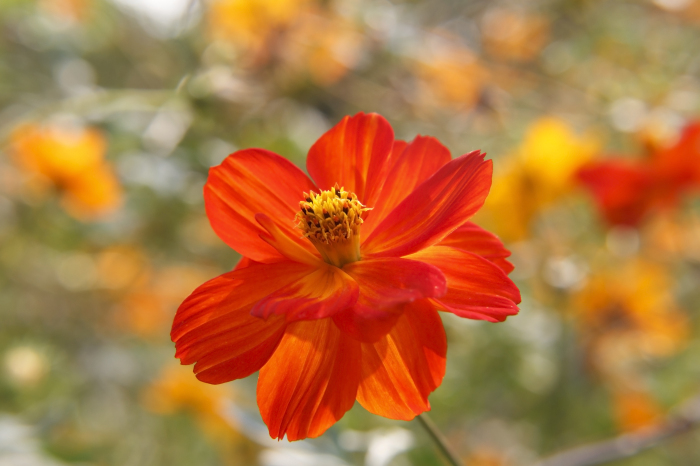
Cosmos sulphureus in orange flower

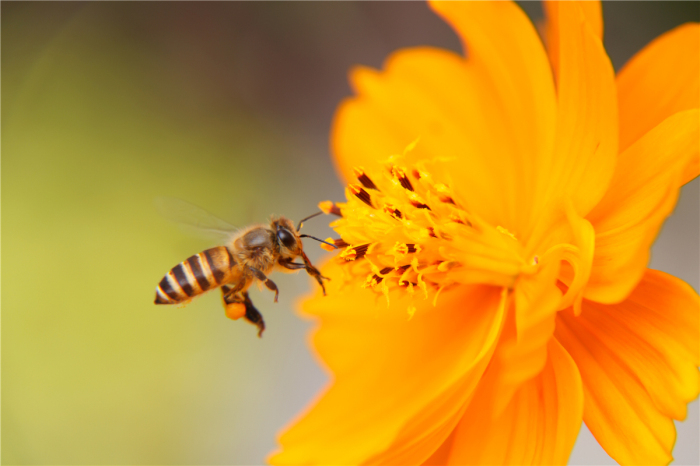
Cosmos sulphureus with bee

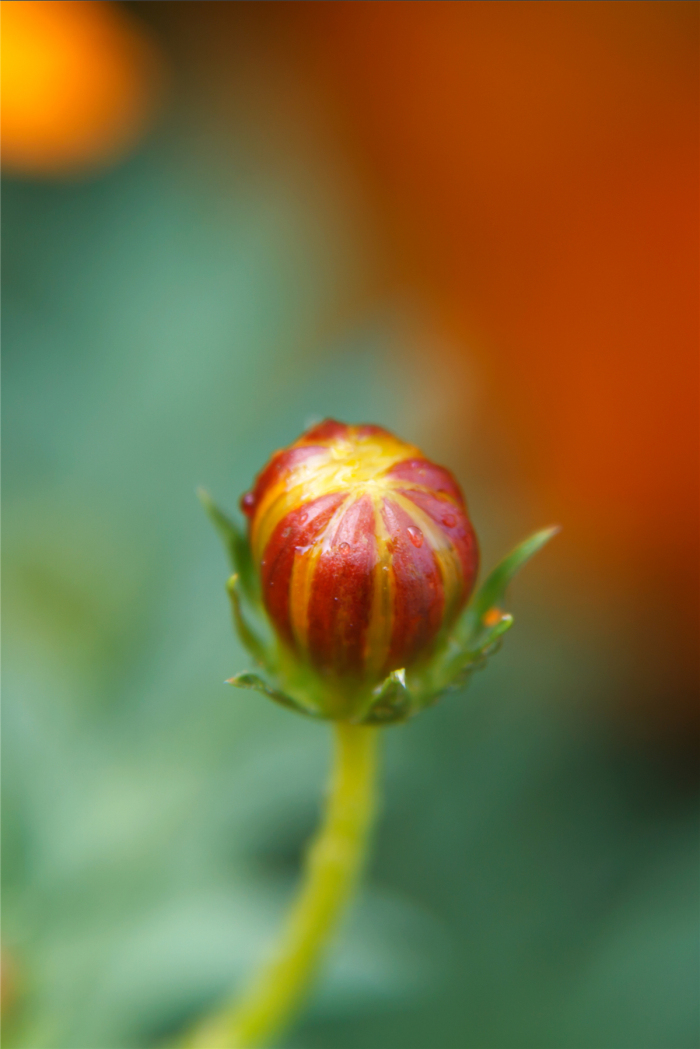
Bud of Cosmos sulphureus

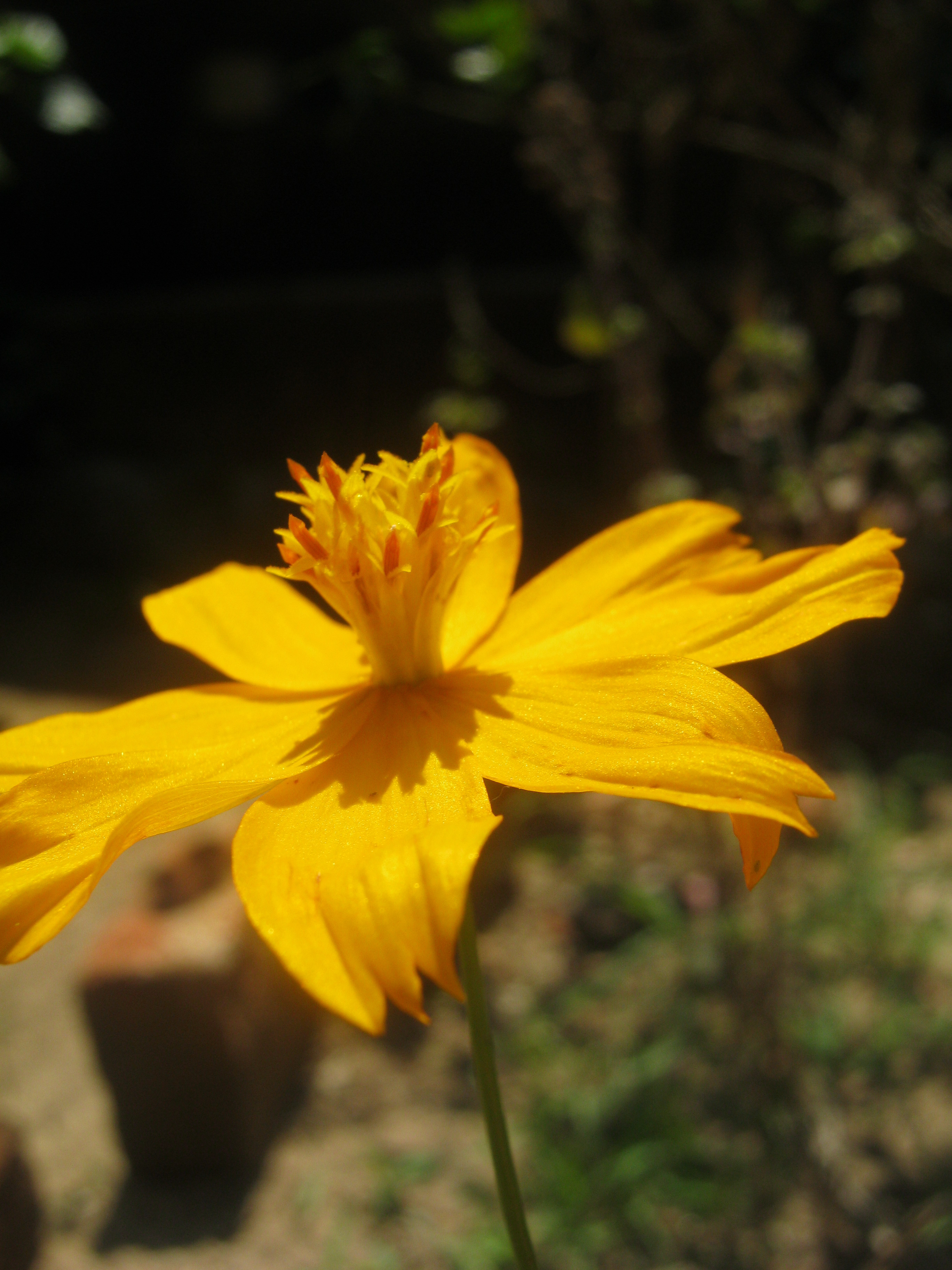
Cosmos sulphureus in Kerala

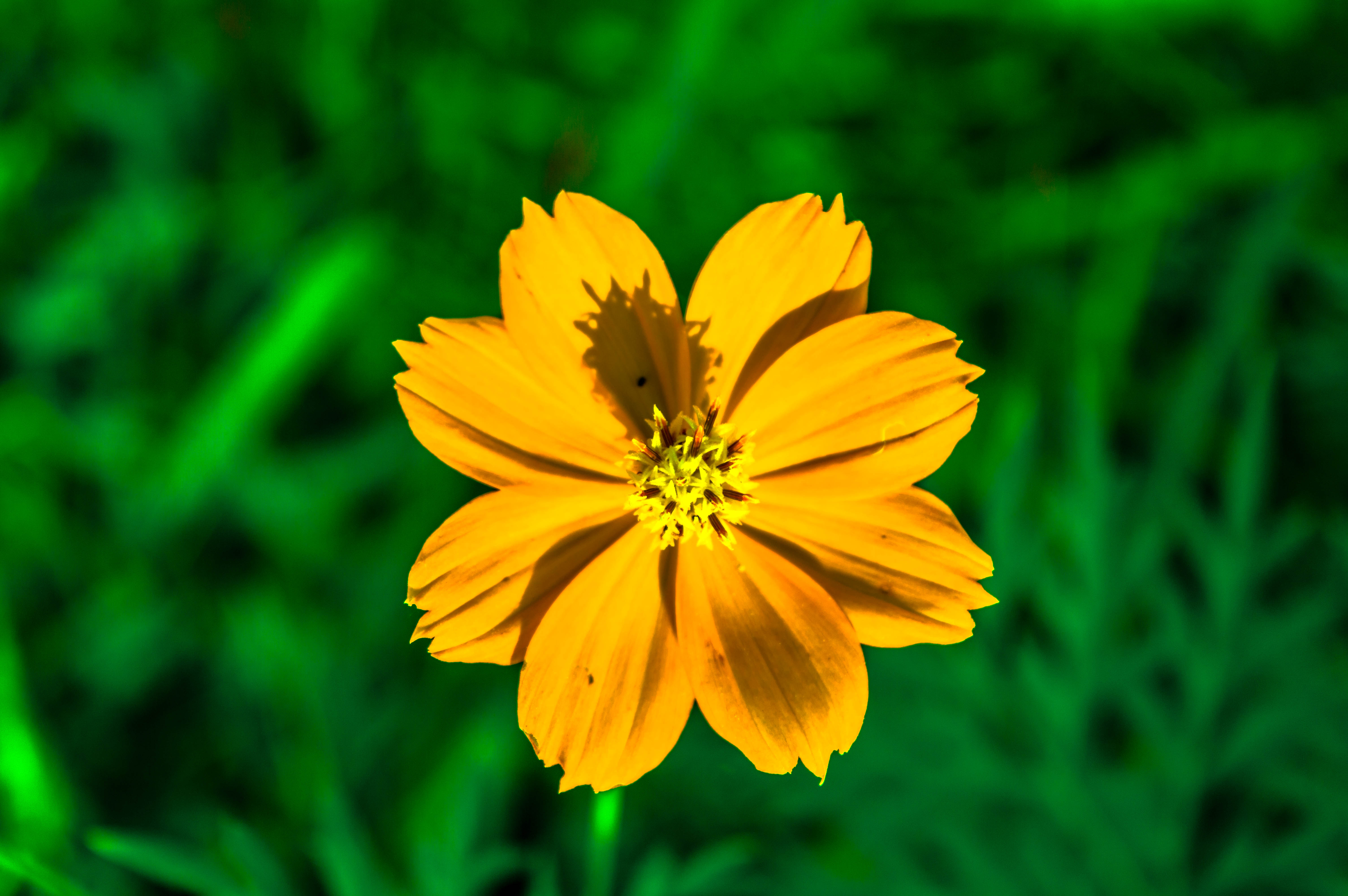
Sulfur cosmos flower

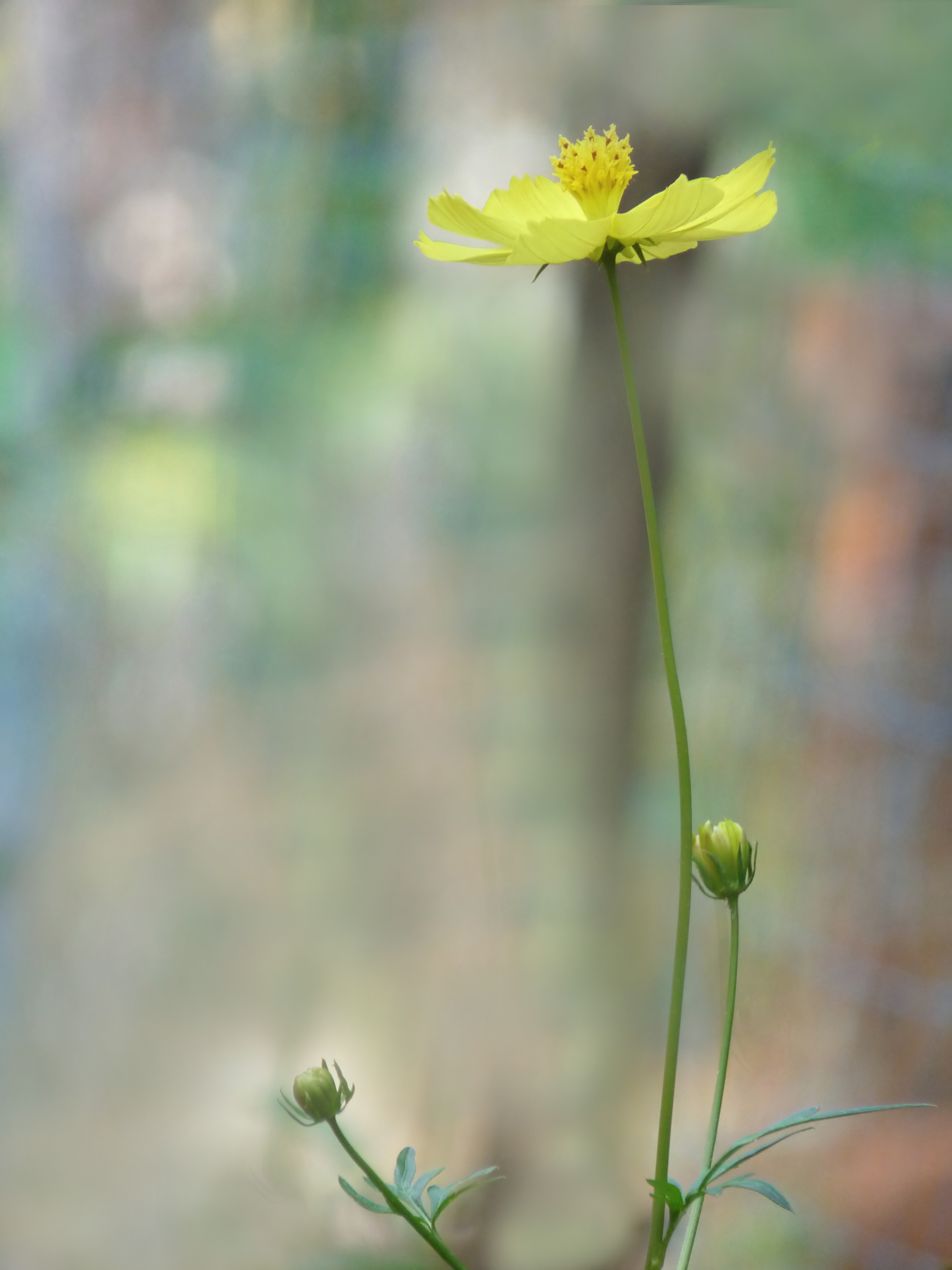
Cosmos sulphureus, buds, flower and leaves

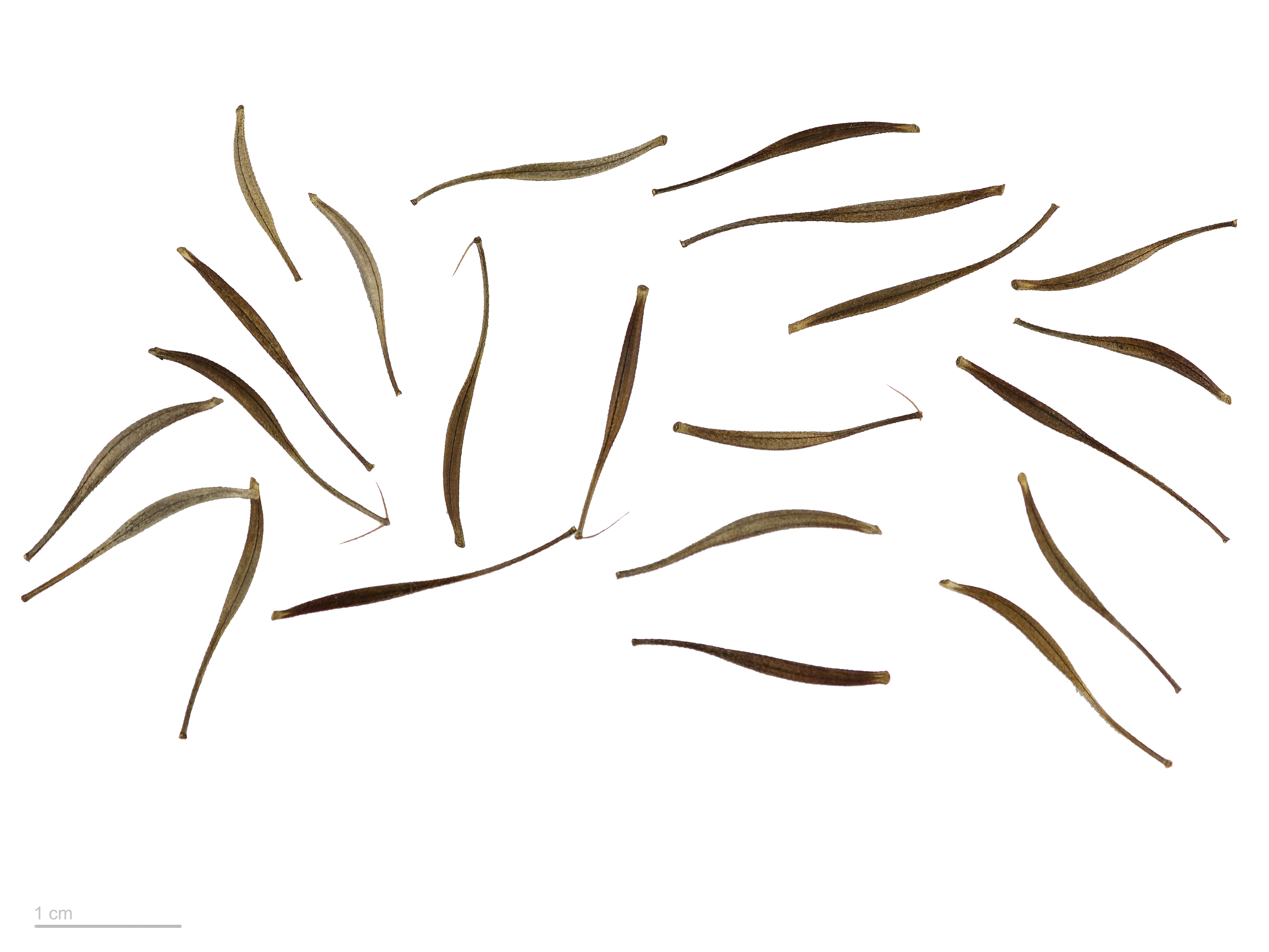
Cosmos sulphureus seeds - MHNT

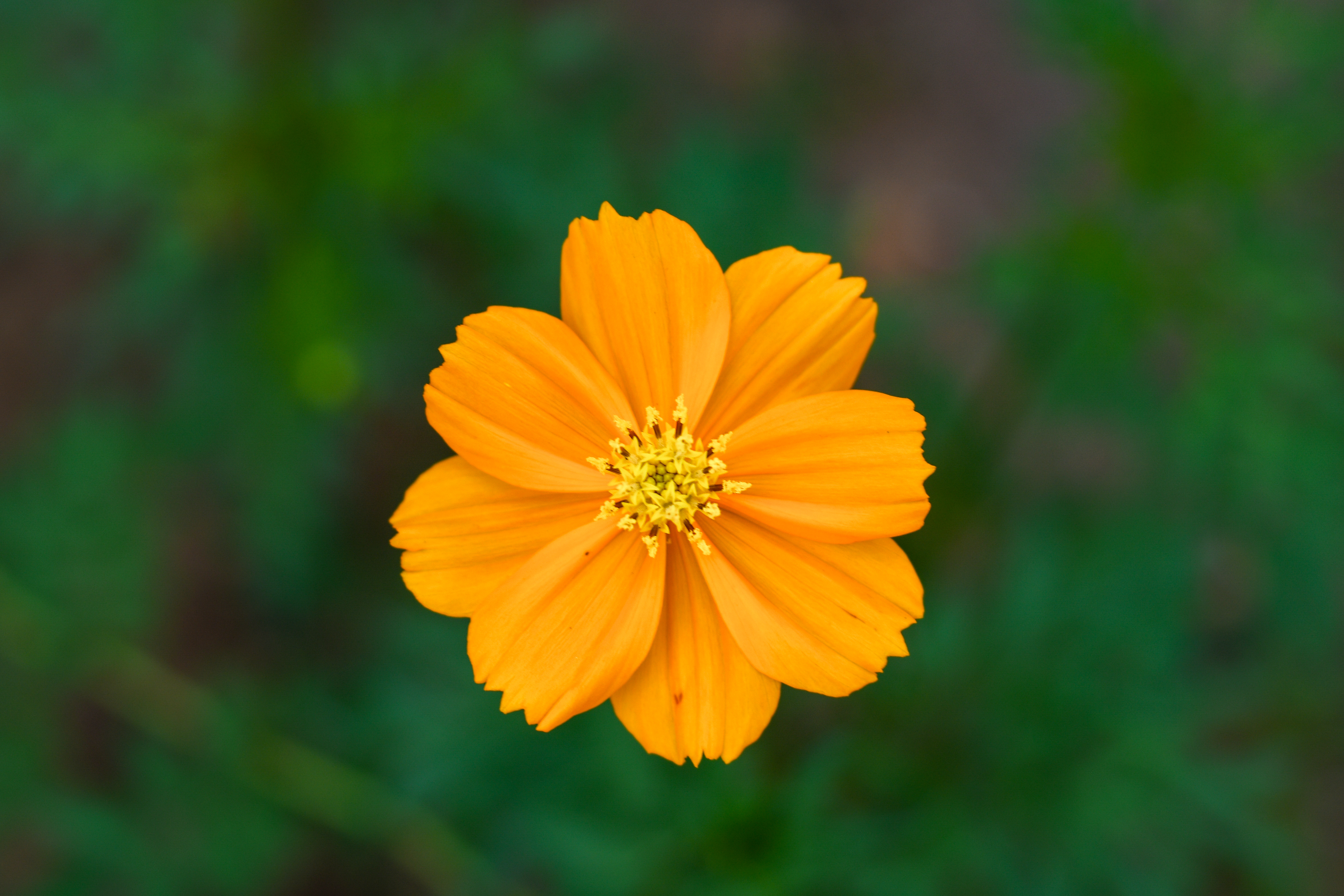
Cosmos sulphureus

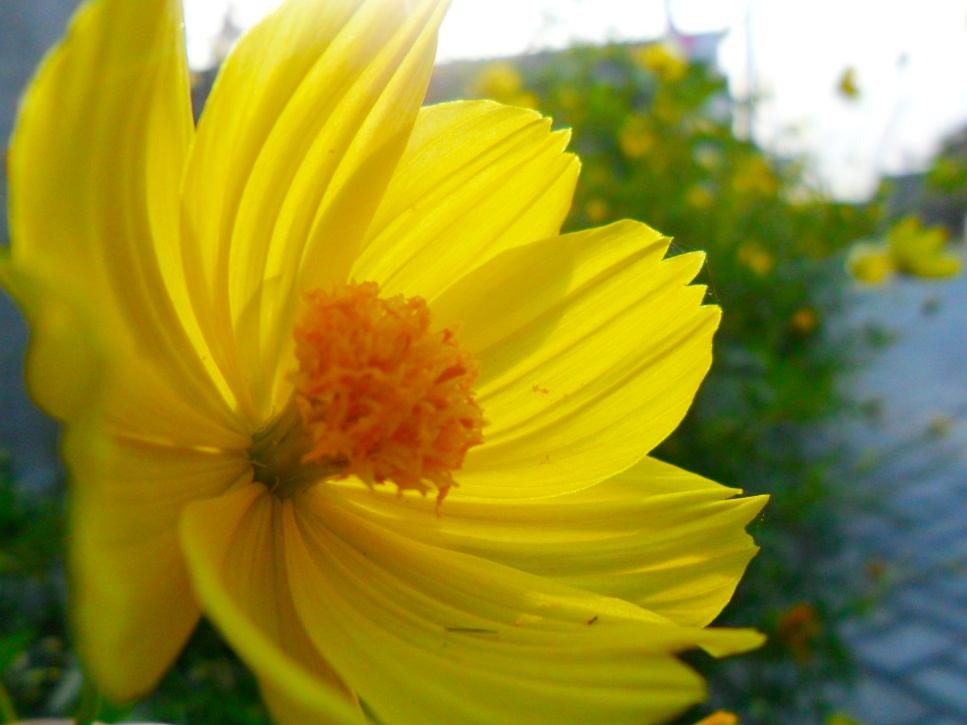
Cosmos flower on bokeh mode

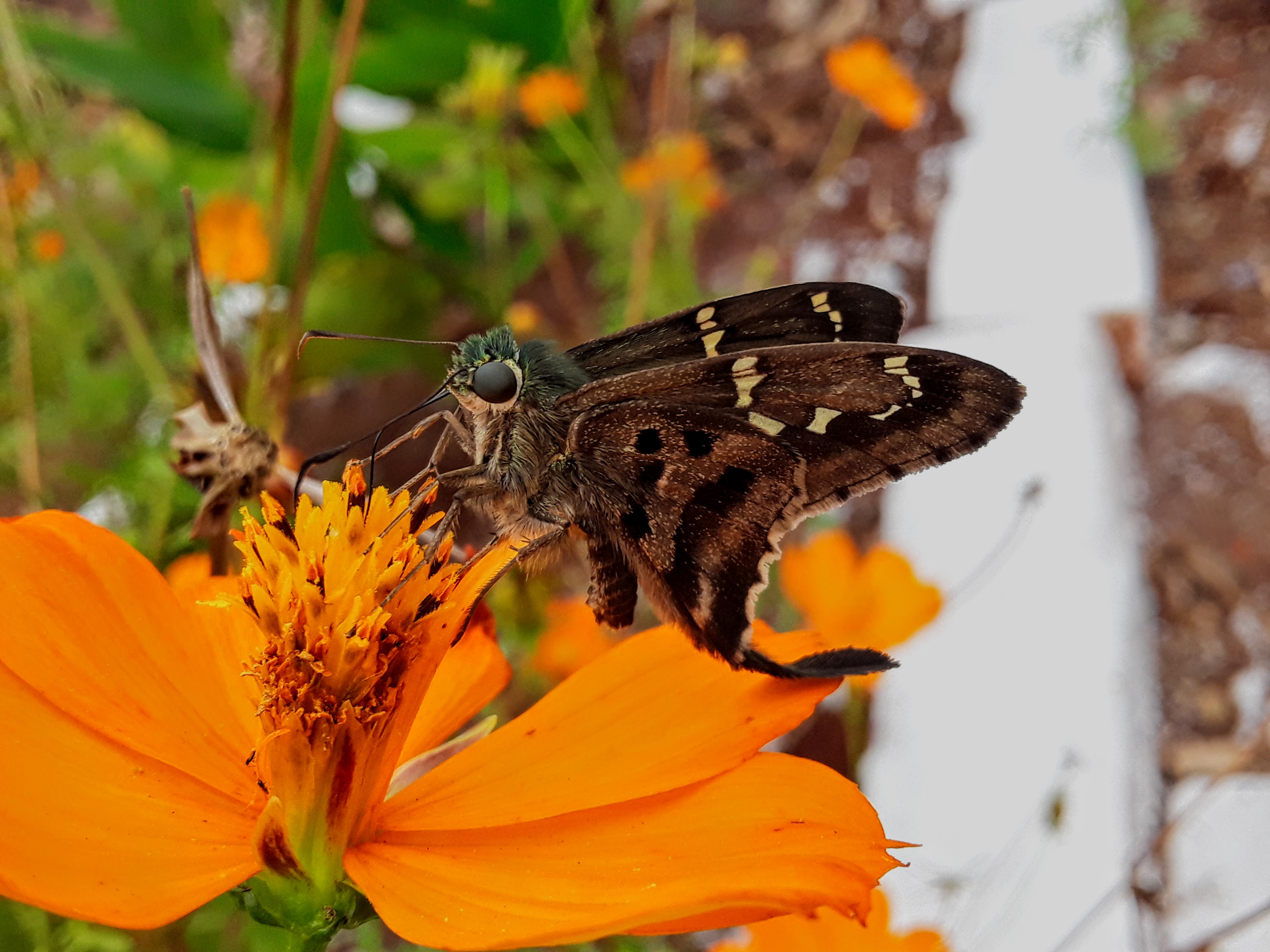

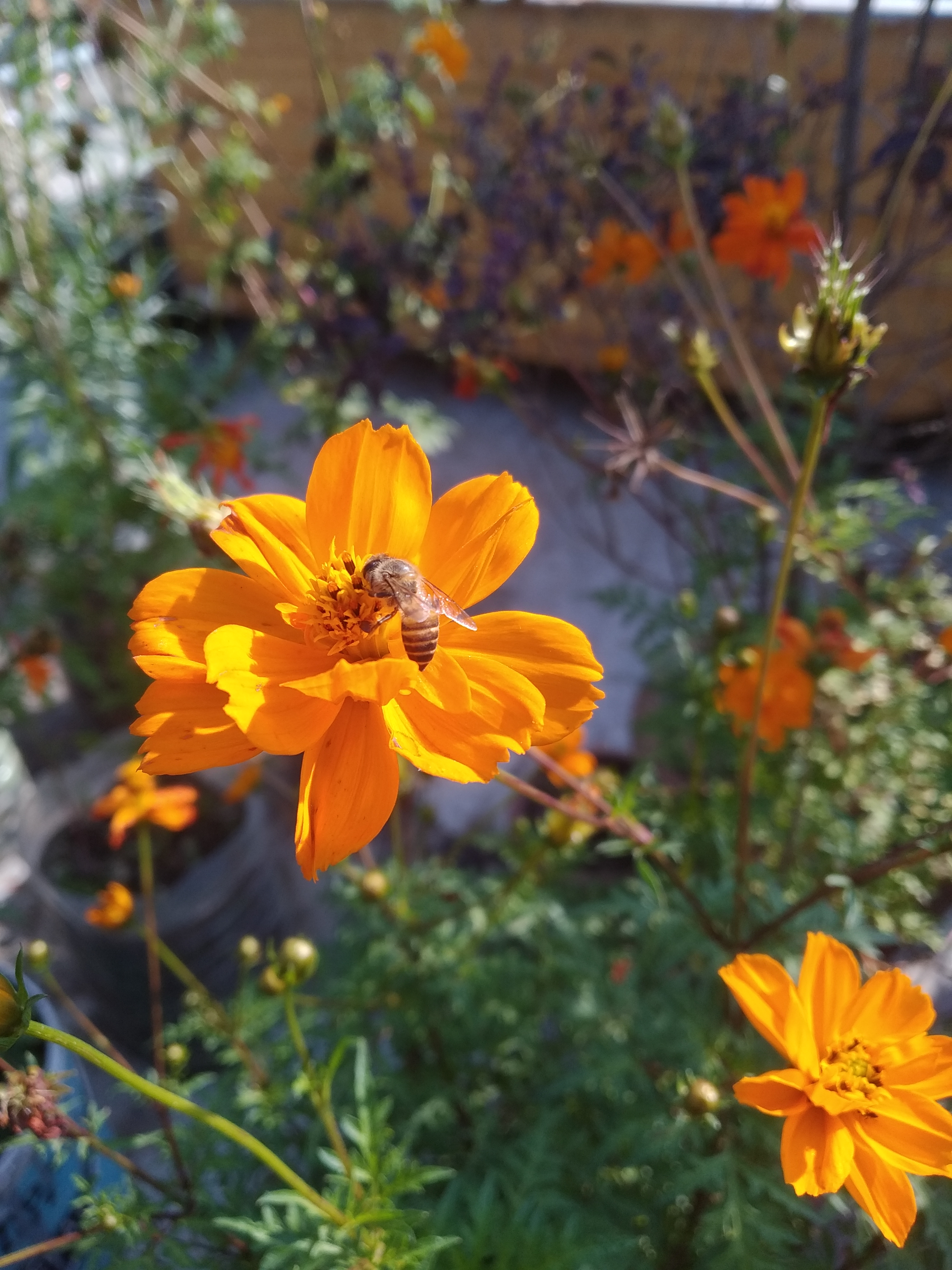

== See also ==
- Cosmos caudatus, similar New World species acquired as an edible vegetable eaten raw in the Old World
