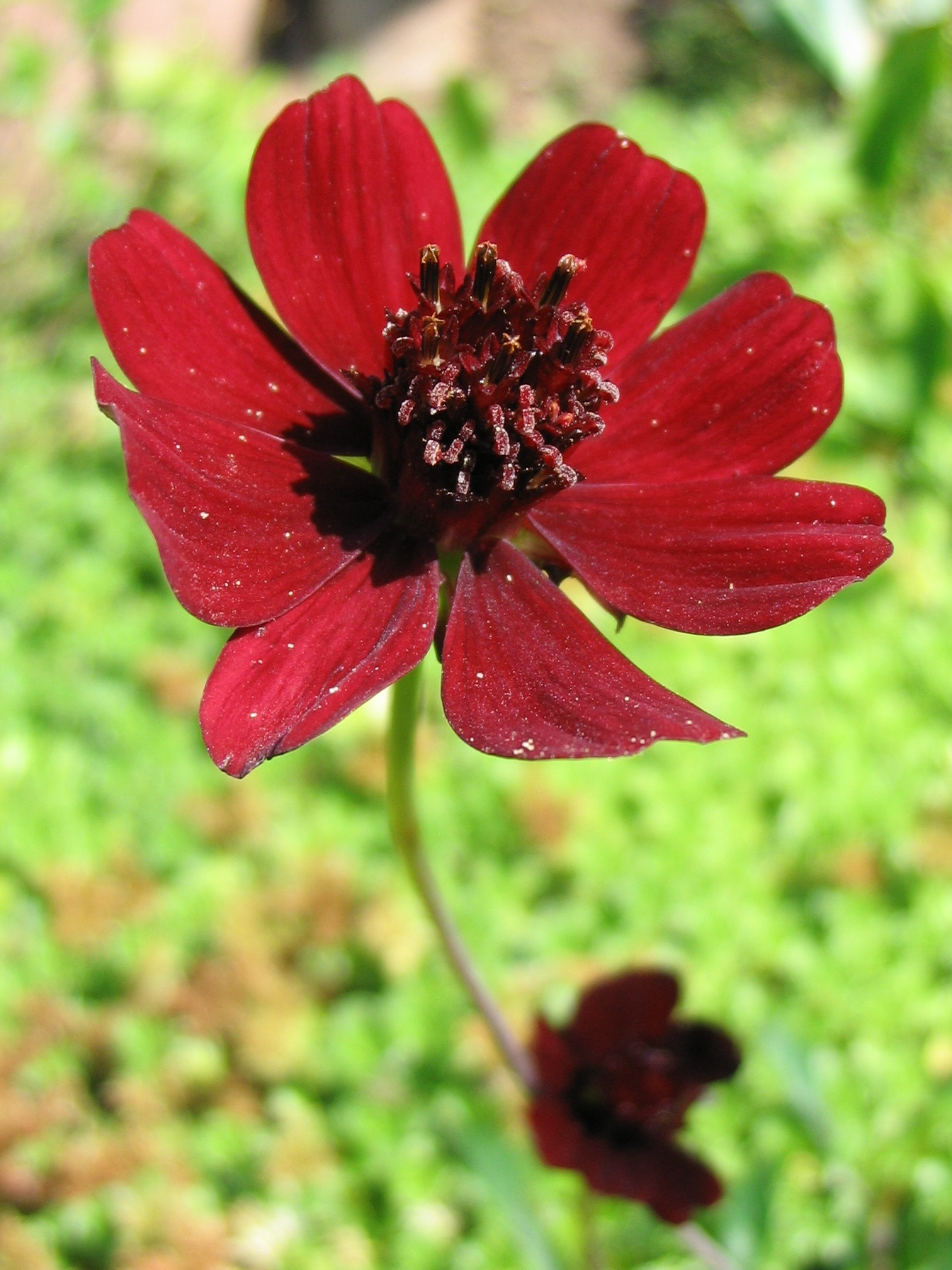

Scientific classification
- Kingdom: Plantae
- Clade: Embryophytes
- Clade: Tracheophytes
- Clade: Spermatophytes
- Clade: Angiosperms
- Clade: Eudicots
- Clade: Asterids
- Order: Asterales
- Family: Asteraceae
- Genus: Cosmos
- Species: C. atrosanguineus

Binomial name
- Cosmos atrosanguineus (Hook.) Voss, not Stapf

Synonyms
- Bidens atrosanguinea (Hook.) Ortgies; Cosmos diversifolius var. atrosanguineus Hook.

= Cosmos atrosanguineus =

Species of flowering plant

Cosmos atrosanguineus, the chocolate cosmos, is a species of Cosmos, native to Mexico. It has often been claimed that it is extinct in the wild; however it is truly abundant in Mexico. The species was introduced into cultivation in 1885, when the British seed company Thompson & Morgan first listed it in their seed catalogue. Its dark red to brownish red flowers have a scent resembling chocolate, which is one reason for its popularity as a cultivated plant.

== Description ==
Cosmos atrosanguineus is a herbaceous perennial plant growing to 40–60 cm tall, with a fleshy tuberous root. The leaves are 7–15 cm long, pinnate, with leaflets 2–5 cm long. The flowers are produced in a capitulum 3–4.5 cm diameter, dark red to maroon-dark brown, with a ring of six to ten (usually eight) broad ray florets and a center of disc florets; they have a light vanillin fragrance (like many chocolates), which becomes more noticeable towards the end of the day.

== Taxonomy ==
The species was first described in 1861 by William Hooker, as Cosmos diversifolia var. atrosanguineus. Eduard Ortgies later elevated it to a full species, placing it in the genus Bidens. Andreas Voss transferred it back to Cosmos, retaining its status as an independent species. It is one of eight species of Cosmos placed in section Discopoda. Cosmos belongs to subtribe Coreopsidinae.

In 2008, Oku, T.; Takahashi, H.; Yagi, F.; et al. analyzed the Chocolate Cosmos flower using PSID (plastid subtype identity) sequences in order to clarify the phylogenetic relationships of this plant. They determined that this species did indeed have closer relations to Cosmos than to the genus of Bidens or Dahlia.

== Distribution and habitat ==
Although it had been reported that Cosmos atrosanguineus was extinct in the wild, a research project on the genus Cosmos begun in 2007 by Mexican botanist Aarón Rodríguez found modern records starting from 1986. Field work showed that it grew in the states of Guanajuato, Querétaro and San Luis Potosí. It is found in mixed pine and oak forest, at elevations of around 1,800–2,450 m (5,910–8,040 ft).

== Cultivation and uses ==
Both seed-raised and vegetatively propagated cultivars are available, varying in the size, colour and shape of the petals. An article in 2017 listed 17 cultivars and seed-raised strains. As of 2018, C. atrosanguineus 'Hamcoec' (trade description Eclipse) has the largest flower heads, up to 5 cm in diameter. The variation in flower color from red to black of Cosmos atrosanguineus and its cultivars results from variation in the amounts of anthocyanins and chalcone present. Hybrids with other Cosmos species are also known in cultivation. As with Cosmos 'Thomocha' (Chocamocha), hybrids may be less scented than the species. Although cosmos smells like chocolate, it should not be eaten.

It requires partial sun or full sun, and flowers from mid to late summer. It is frost-sensitive (Zones 6–11); in temperate zones, the tuber has to be dug up and stored in a frost-free store over the winter.
