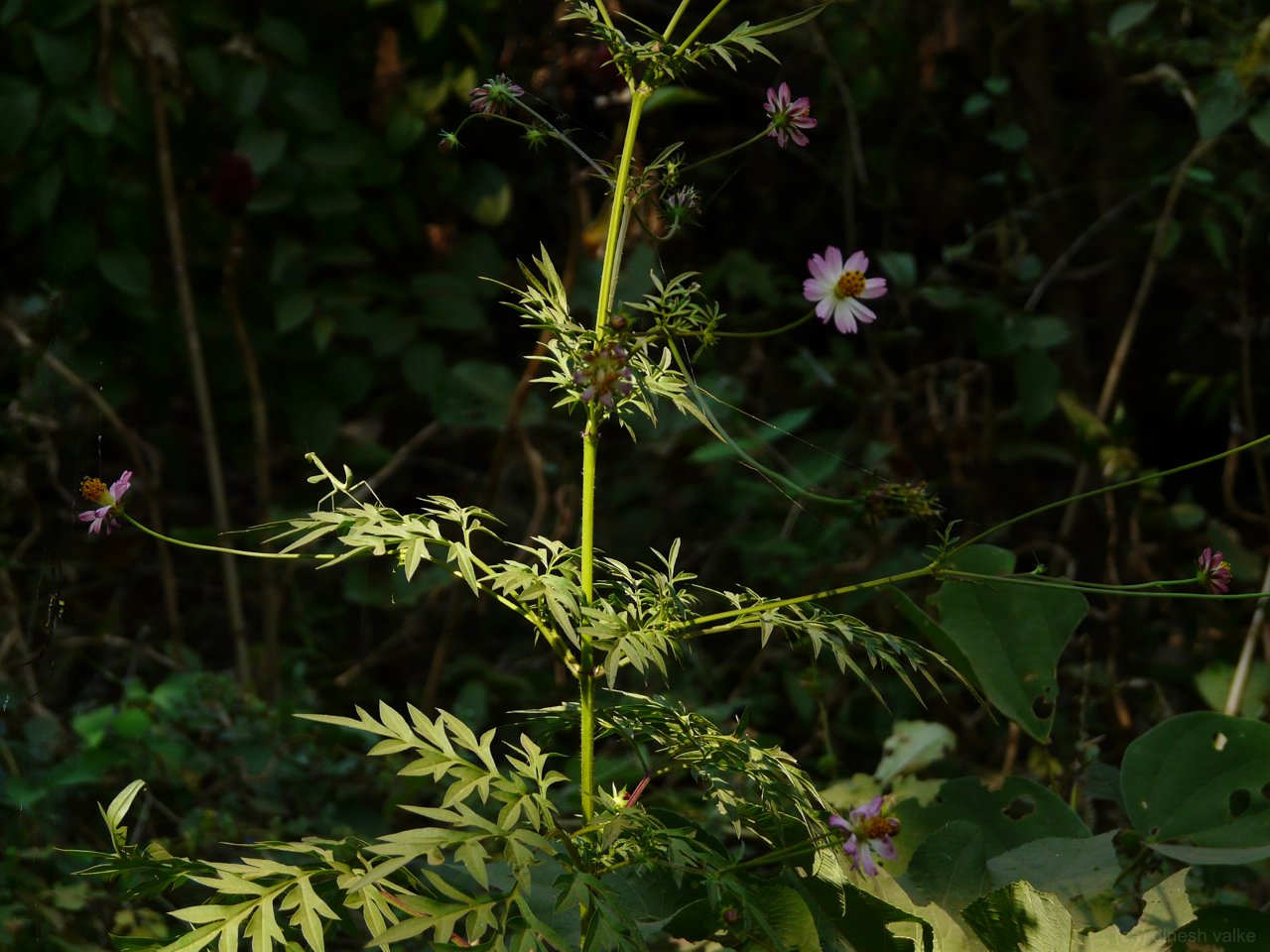
- Wild Cosmos caudatus

Scientific classification
- Kingdom: Plantae
- Clade: Tracheophytes
- Clade: Angiosperms
- Clade: Eudicots
- Clade: Asterids
- Order: Asterales
- Family: Asteraceae
- Genus: Cosmos
- Species: C. caudatus

Binomial name
- Cosmos caudatus Kunth

Synonyms
- Bidens berteriana Spreng.; Bidens carnea Heer; Bidens caudata (Kunth) Sch.Bip.; Cosmos caudatus var. exaristatus Sherff; Cosmea caudata (Kunth) Spreng.; Bidens artemisiifolia subsp. caudata (Kunth) Kuntze

= Cosmos caudatus =

Species of flowering plant

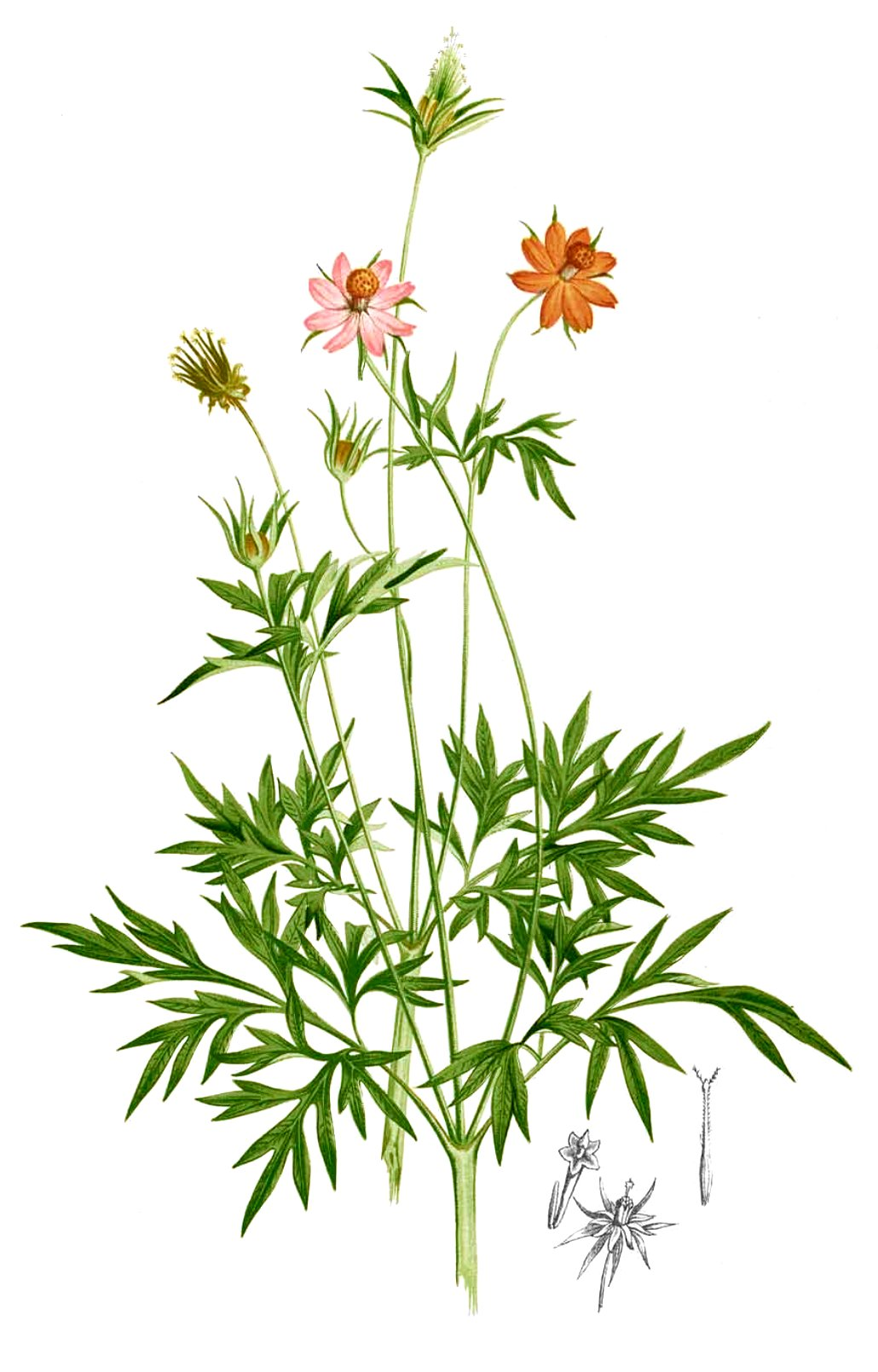
Cosmos caudatus illustration

Cosmos caudatus or king's salad is an annual plant in the genus Cosmos, bearing purple, pink, or white ray florets. It is native to Latin America (from Rio Grande do Sul in southern Brazil to Tamaulipas in northeastern Mexico), and the West Indies, though naturalized in tropical parts of Asia, Africa, and Australia.

== Description ==
The plant is known by several vernacular names in Central America which include:

- chactsul (Yucatán, Quintana Roo)
- estrella del mar (Yucatán, Quintana Roo)
- cambray (Honduras, El Salvador)
- cambray rojo (Honduras, El Salvador)
- mozote-doradilla (El Salvador)
- flor de muerto (Costa Rica)

The species grows up to 2 m (6 ft 7 in) in height. The leaves are soft and pungent while the stem is light green with a purplish hue and succulent. As night falls the leaves fold to close the terminal buds as the plant literally sleeps. The flowers can be found solitary or in a loose clusters and are produced on a single stalk on auxiliary heads.

== Gastronomy ==
Cosmos caudatus is edible and its common names include kenikir (Indonesia) or ulam raja (in Malaysia, calqued as "the King's salad"). In Indonesian cuisine and Malaysian cuisine, the leaves of this plant are used for ulam, a type of traditional raw salad. In Brunei, it was usually served with sambal (chilli paste) together with the local cuisine, ambuyat. It was brought by the Spaniards from Latin America, via the Philippines, to the rest of Southeast Asia.

== See also ==
- Cosmos sulphureus, similar New World species acquired as an edible vegetable eaten raw in the Old World
