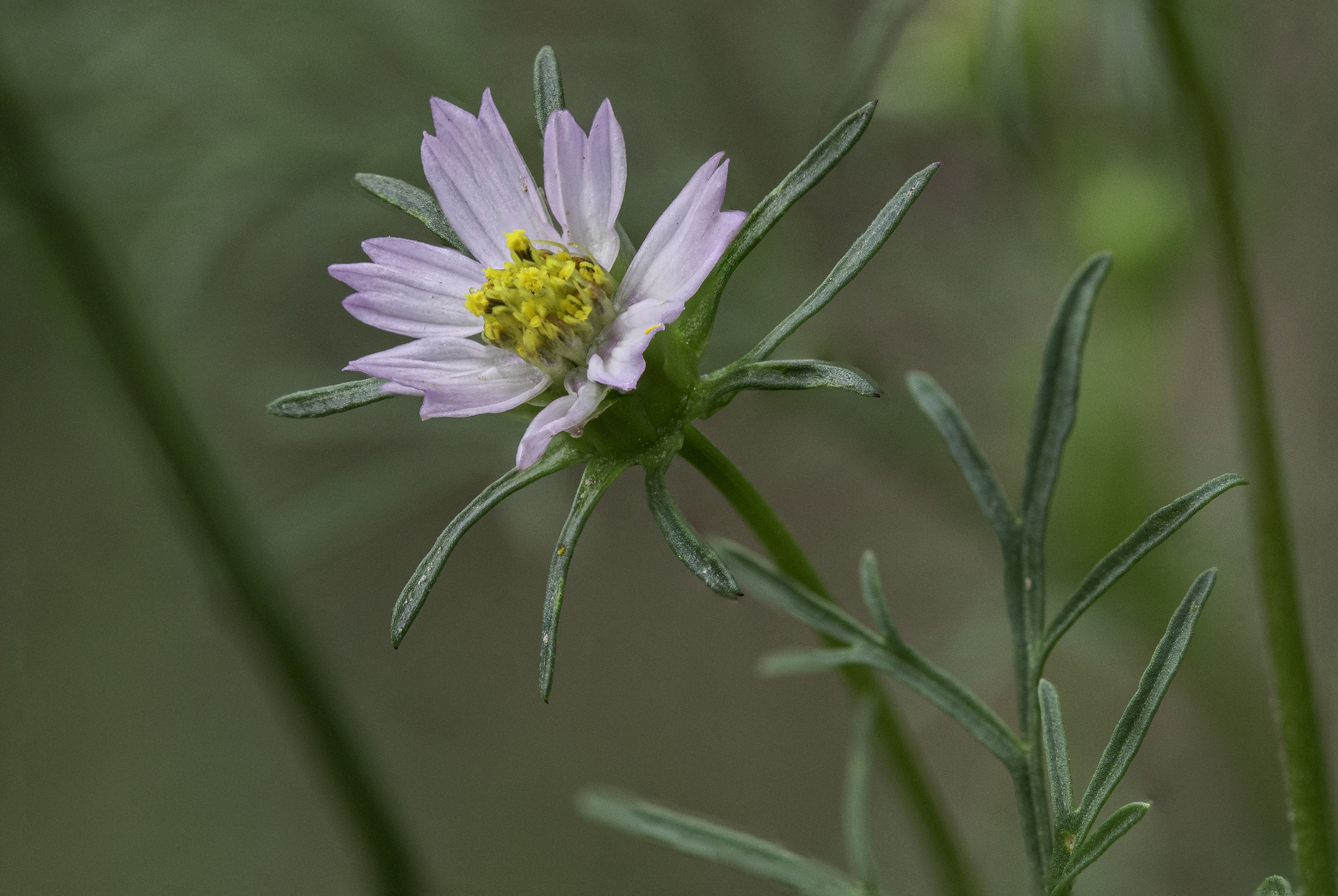

Conservation status
- Secure (NatureServe)

Scientific classification
- Kingdom: Plantae
- Clade: Tracheophytes
- Clade: Angiosperms
- Clade: Eudicots
- Clade: Asterids
- Order: Asterales
- Family: Asteraceae
- Genus: Cosmos
- Species: C. parviflorus

Binomial name
- Cosmos parviflorus (Jacq.) Pers.

Synonyms
- Coreopsis parviflora Jacq.; Cosmea parviflora Willd.; Cosmos bipinnatus var parviflorus (Jacq.) A. Gray; Bidens humboldtii Sch.Bip

= Cosmos parviflorus =

Species of flowering plant

Cosmos parviflorus, commonly known as the southwestern cosmos, is an annual, herbaceous, flowering plant in the Asteraceae family. It is native to parts of the Southwestern United States and most of Mexico (from Chihuahua to Oaxaca) and appears to be introduced in portions of the Northeastern United States (Maryland, Maine, Rhode Island and Massachusetts).

== Description ==
Cosmos parviflorus is an annual, herbaceous, flowering plant that typically grows between 30 and 90 cm (12 and 35 in) tall. The opposite leaves are attached to petioles around 0.5 cm long, and are deeply divided into narrow linear segments. The ray florets are a white, pink or violet color with the colors sometimes mixed in the same population. The achenes are barbed, causing them to lodge in fur or clothing. They can thus be transported over long distances.

The plant typically flowers from July to October.

== Distribution and habitat ==
Cosmos parviflorus is native to Mexico (from Chihuahua to Oaxaca) and parts of the United States (Texas, New Mexico, Arizona, Colorado). Collections of this species have also been made in Missouri, Maryland, Massachusetts, Maine and Rhode Island, though it appears that this species is not native in those states.

=== Habitat ===
This species grows in open or forested slopes and canyons at elevations of 100 to 3000 meters from sea level. It also is a common weed in agricultural fields.

== Conservation ==
As of December 2024, the conservation group NatureServe listed Cosmos parviflorus as Secure (G5) worldwide. This status was last reviewed on 11 June 1993.

== Taxonony ==
Cosmos parviflorus was first named as Coreopsis parviflora by Nicolaus Jacquin in 1798. In 1807, Christiaan Hendrik Persoon renamed the species to its currently accepted name, Cosmos parviflorus.

=== Etymology ===
The species epithet parviflorus means "small-flowered". In English, the plant is commonly called the southwestern cosmos.
