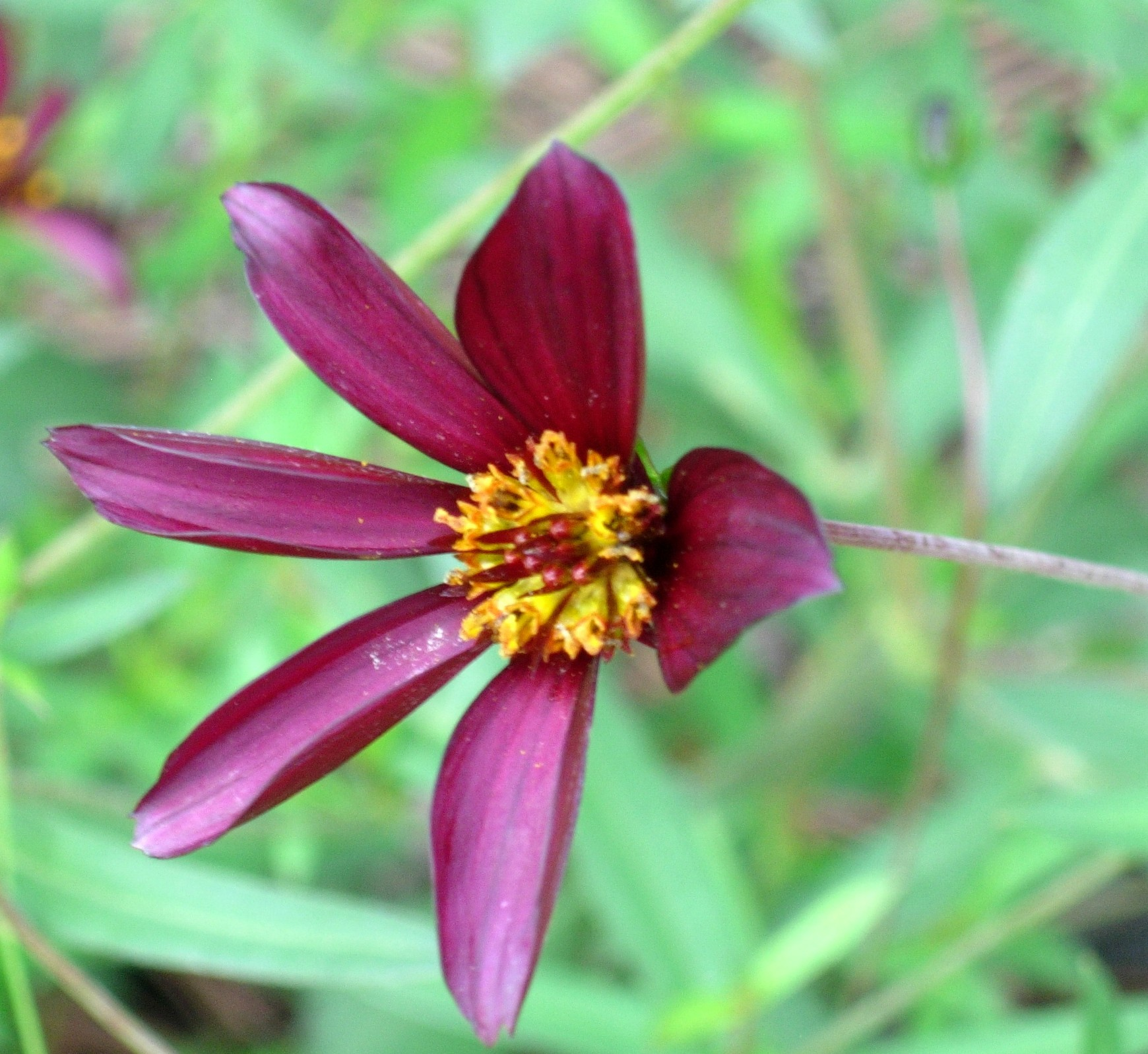

Scientific classification
- Kingdom: Plantae
- Clade: Tracheophytes
- Clade: Angiosperms
- Clade: Eudicots
- Clade: Asterids
- Order: Asterales
- Family: Asteraceae
- Genus: Cosmos
- Species: C. longipetiolatus

Binomial name
- Cosmos longipetiolatus Melchert

= Cosmos longipetiolatus =

Species of flowering plant

Cosmos longipetiolatus is a species of plant in the family Asteraceae. It has been found only in the state of Jalisco in southern Mexico.

Cosmos longipetiolatus is a branching perennial, producing thick, tuberous roots underground. Leaves are highly divided into many small lobes and leaflets. Each plant produces numerous flower heads, with purple or lavender ray florets and yellow disc florets.
