= Cosmos pacificus =

Scientific classification
- Kingdom: Plantae
- Clade: Tracheophytes
- Clade: Angiosperms
- Clade: Eudicots
- Clade: Asterids
- Order: Asterales
- Family: Asteraceae
- Genus: Cosmos
- Species: C. pacificus

Binomial name
- Cosmos pacificus Melchert

Synonyms
- Cosmos caudatus var. exaristatus Sherff

Species of flowering plant

Cosmos pacificus is a Mexican species of plants in the family Asteraceae. It is native to southwestern and west-central Mexico from Sinaloa to Chiapas.

Cosmos pacificus is a branching annual up to 200 cm (80 inches) tall. Leaves and highly lobed and dissected. The plant produces many flower heads, each with pink to lavender ray florets and yellow disc florets.

The oldest name for the taxon is Cosmos caudatus var. exaristatus, coined by Earl Edward Sherff in 1964. In elevating the taxon from varietal level to species, Melchert opted to forego the common (but not mandatory) custom of using the varietal epithet as specific epithet, choosing instead to create a new name, Cosmos pacificus.

Varieties

- Cosmos pacificus var. chiapensis Melchert - Chiapas
- Cosmos pacificus var. pacificus - Sinaloa, Jalisco, Colima, Michoacán, México State
