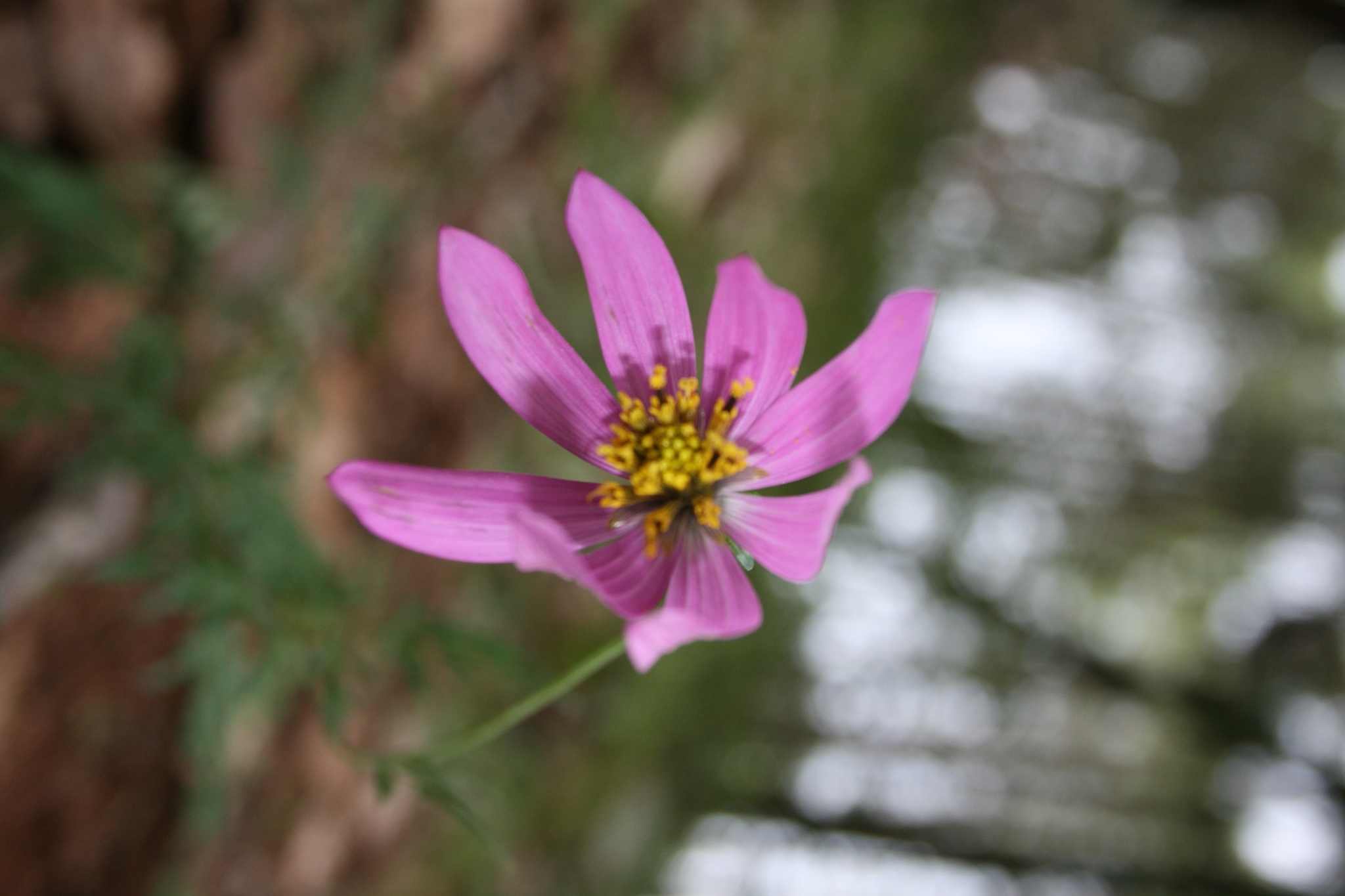

Scientific classification
- Kingdom: Plantae
- Clade: Tracheophytes
- Clade: Angiosperms
- Clade: Eudicots
- Clade: Asterids
- Order: Asterales
- Family: Asteraceae
- Genus: Cosmos
- Species: C. sherffii

Binomial name
- Cosmos sherffii Melchert

= Cosmos sherffii =

Species of flowering plant

Cosmos sherffii is a species of plant in the family Asteraceae. It has been found only in the state of Oaxaca in southern Mexico.

Cosmos sherffii is a branching perennial up to 80 cm (32 inches) tall, producing thick, tuberous roots underground. Leaves are highly divided into many small lobes and leaflets. Each stem usually produces only one flower head, with rose-colored ray florets and yellow disc florets.
