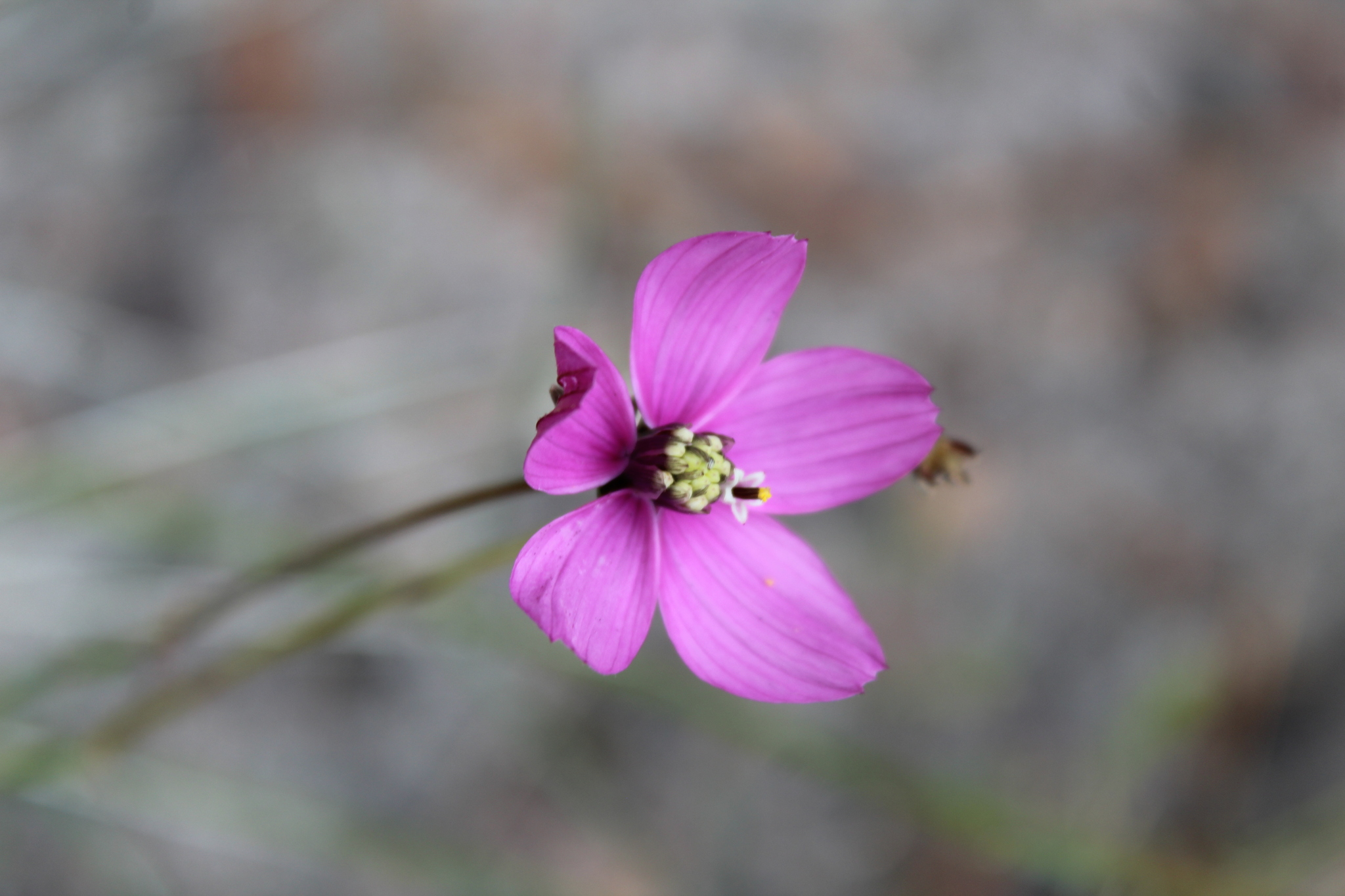

Scientific classification
- Kingdom: Plantae
- Clade: Tracheophytes
- Clade: Angiosperms
- Clade: Eudicots
- Clade: Asterids
- Order: Asterales
- Family: Asteraceae
- Genus: Cosmos
- Species: C. ochroleucoflorus

Binomial name
- Cosmos ochroleucoflorus Melchert

= Cosmos ochroleucoflorus =

Species of flowering plant

Cosmos ochroleucoflorus is a Mexican species of plants in the family Asteraceae. It has been found only in the state of Durango in northwestern Mexico.

Cosmos ochroleucoflorus is a branching perennial up to 80 cm (32 inches) tall, spreading by means of underground rhizomes. Leaves are narrow, undivided, up to 13 cm (5 inches) long. Each stem produces one or a few flower heads, each with pink or lavender ray florets and white or pale yellow disc florets.
