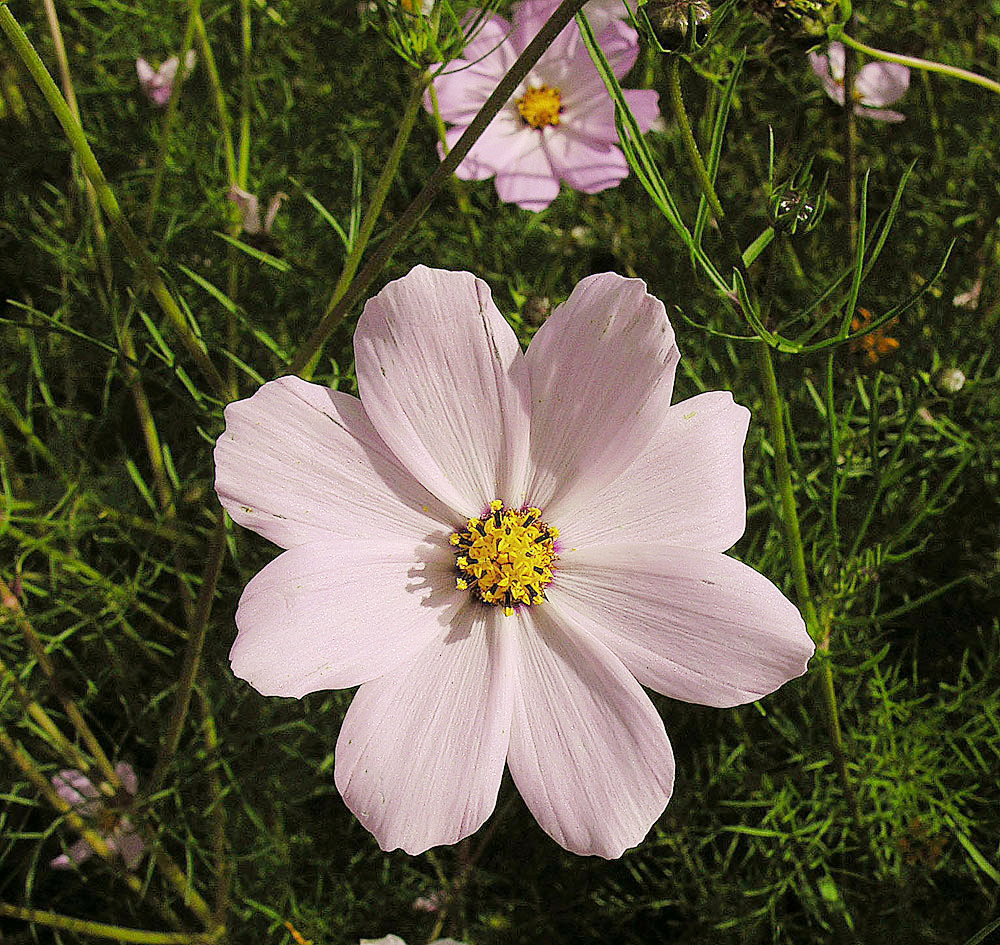
- C. bipinnatus wild in Oaxaca, Mexico
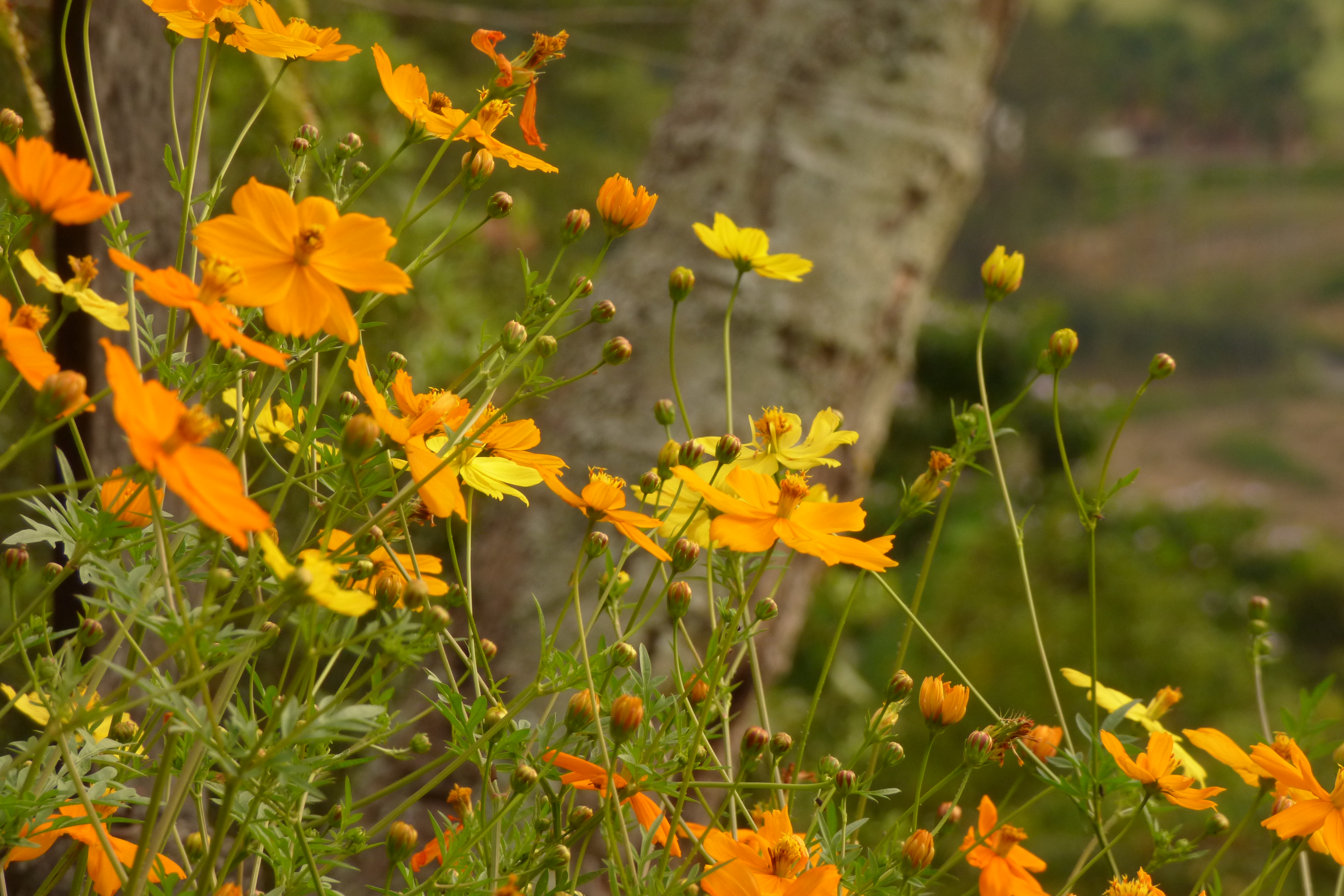
- C. sulphureus

Scientific classification
- Kingdom: Plantae
- Clade: Tracheophytes
- Clade: Angiosperms
- Clade: Eudicots
- Clade: Asterids
- Order: Asterales
- Family: Asteraceae
- Subfamily: Asteroideae
- Tribe: Coreopsideae
- Genus: Cosmos; Cav.

Synonyms
- Cosmea Willd.; Adenolepis Less.; Cosmos sect. Eucosmos Sherff; Cosmus Pers.

= Cosmos (plant) =

Genus of flowering plants in the daisy family

Cosmos is a genus, with the same common name of cosmos, consisting of flowering plants in the daisy family.

== Name ==
The generic name Cosmos derives either from the Greek κόσμος (cosmos) '(ordered) world' – in reference to the neat, orderly arrangement of the floral structures – or the Greek κόσμημα (kósmima) 'jewel' – in reference to the jewel-like colors of the capitula (composite flowers).

== Description ==
Cosmos are herbaceous perennial plants or annual plants growing 0.3–2 metres (1–6 1/2 ft) tall. The leaves are simple, pinnate, or bipinnate, and arranged in opposite pairs. The flowers are produced in a capitulum with a ring of broad ray florets and a center of disc florets; flower color varies noticeably between the different species. The genus includes several ornamental plants popular in gardens. Numerous hybrids and cultivars have been selected and named.

== Species ==
Kew's Plants of the World Online accepts 35 species, with the Compositae Working Group listing two more.

- Cosmos atrosanguineus (Hook.) Voss
- Cosmos bipinnatus Cav.
- Cosmos carvifolius Benth.
- Cosmos caudatus Kunth
- Cosmos concolor Sherff
- Cosmos crithmifolius Kunth
- Cosmos deficiens (Sherff) Melchert
- Cosmos diversifolius Otto ex Knowles & Westc.
- Cosmos herzogii Sherff (treated by POWO as Bidens herzogii (Sherff) D.J.N.Hind)
- Cosmos intercedens Sherff
- Cosmos jaliscensis Sherff
- Cosmos juxtlahuacensis Panero & Villaseñor
- Cosmos landii Sherff
- Cosmos linearifolius (Sch.Bip.) Hemsl.
- Cosmos longipetiolatus Melchert
- Cosmos mattfeldii Sherff
- Cosmos mcvaughii Sherff
- Cosmos microcephalus Sherff (unplaced by POWO)
- Cosmos modestus Sherff
- Cosmos montanus Sherff
- Cosmos nelsonii B.L.Rob. & Fernald
- Cosmos nitidus Paray
- Cosmos ochroleucoflorus Melchert
- Cosmos pacificus Melchert
- Cosmos palmeri B.L.Rob.
- Cosmos parviflorus (Jacq.) Pers.
- Cosmos peucedanifolius Wedd.
- Cosmos pringlei B.L.Rob. & Fernald
- Cosmos pseudoperfoliatus Art.Castro, Harker & Aarón Rodr.
- Cosmos purpureus (DC.) Benth. & Hook.f. ex Hemsl.
- Cosmos ramirezianus Art.Castro, Harker & Aarón Rodr.
- Cosmos scabiosoides Kunth
- Cosmos schaffneri Sherff
- Cosmos sessilis Sherff
- Cosmos sherffii Melchert
- Cosmos steenisiae Veldkamp
- Cosmos sulphureus Cav.

== Distribution ==
Cosmos species are native to scrub and meadowland in the Americas, from Colorado and Missouri in the United States, extending south through Mexico (where highest species diversity occurs, with 33 of the 35 species) and Central America to South America as far south as northern Argentina.

One species, C. bipinnatus, is naturalized across much of the eastern U.S. and eastern Canada. The genus is also widespread over the high eastern plains of South Africa, where it was introduced via contaminated horsefeed during the Anglo-Boer War.

== Uses ==
Cosmos caudatus and C. sulphureus are edible and a major part of salads eaten as appetizers before meals in Maritime Southeast Asia including the Malay ulam and the Sundanese lalab.

== Gallery ==
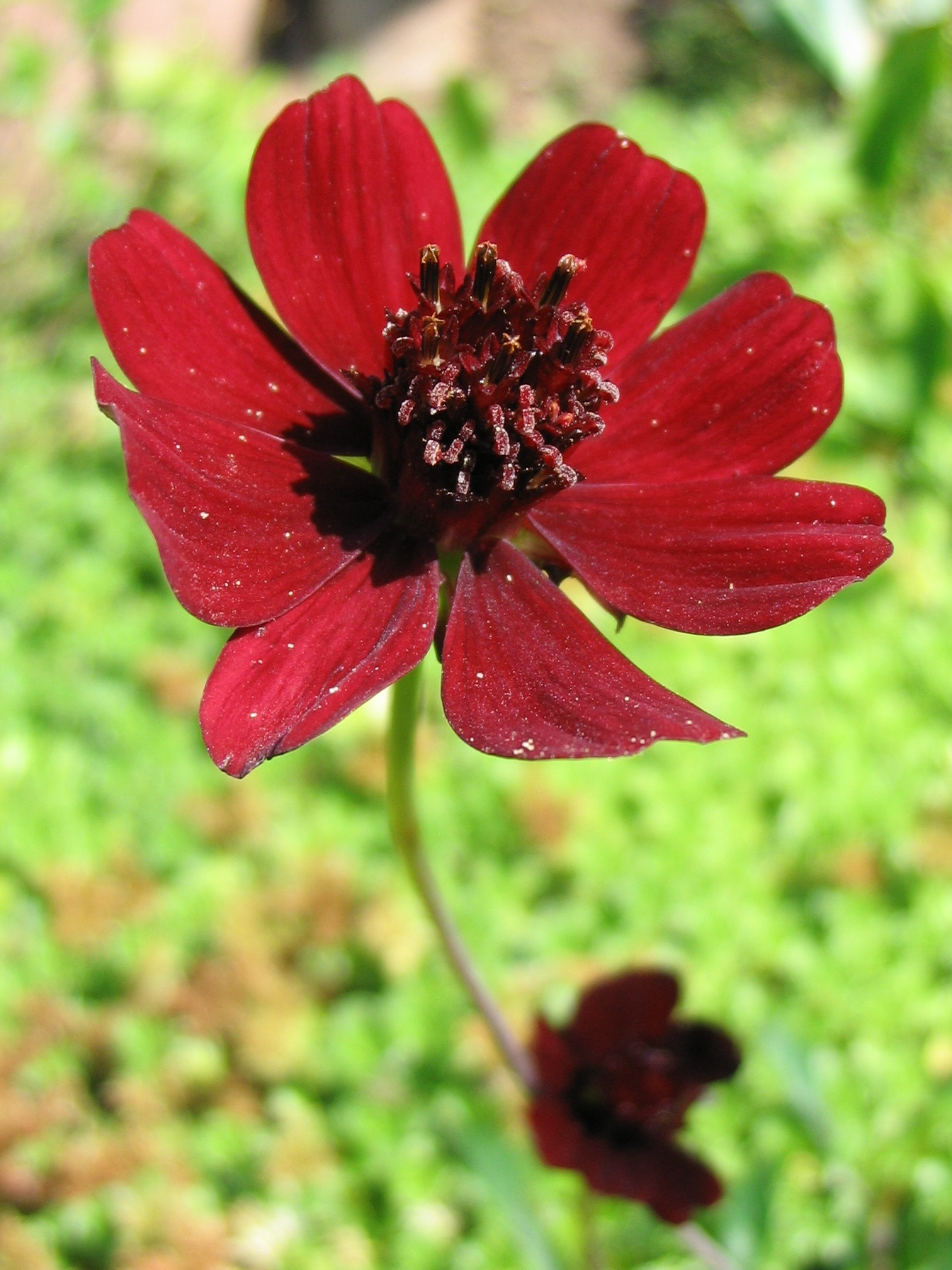
Cosmos atrosanguineus

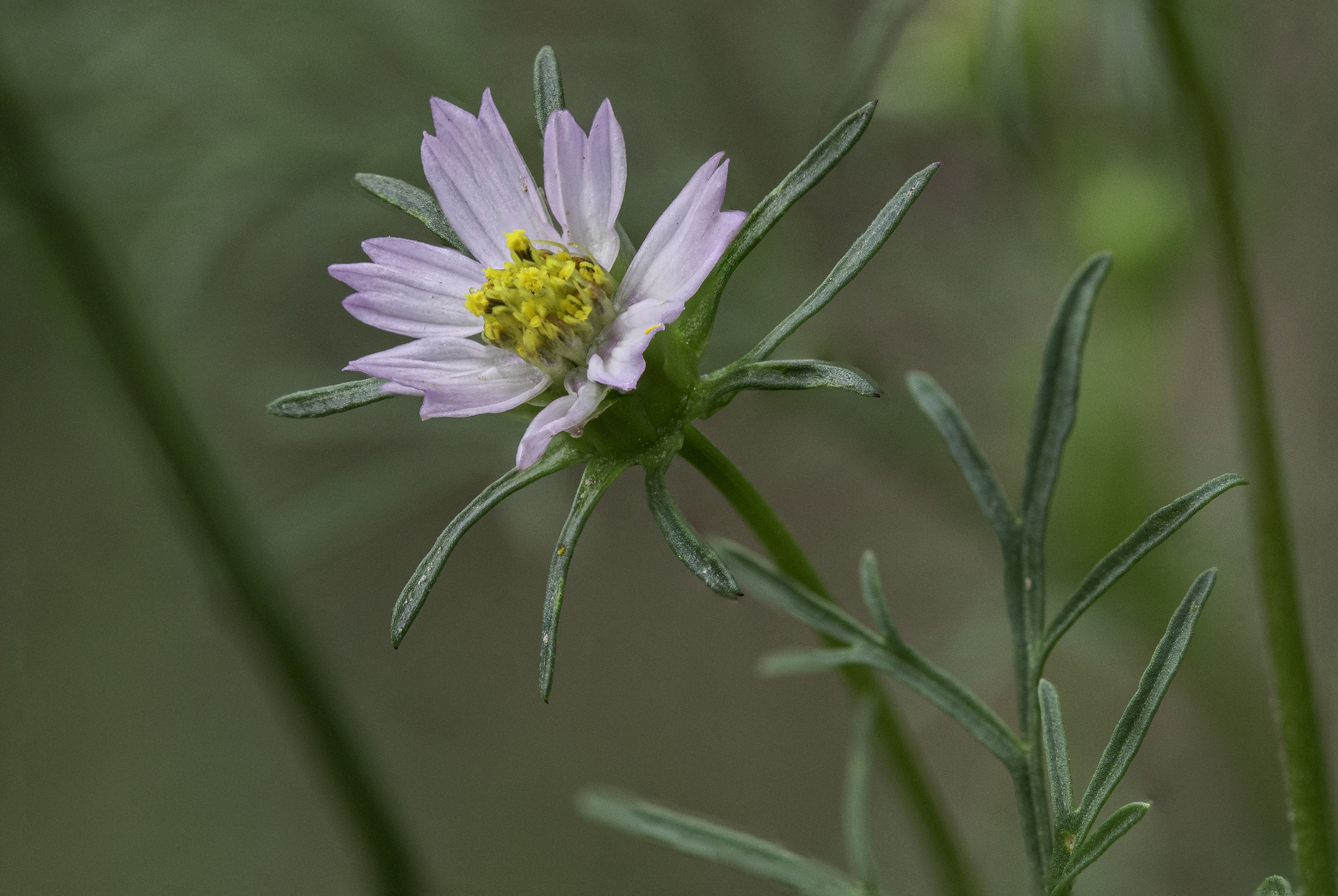
C. parviflorus in Colorado

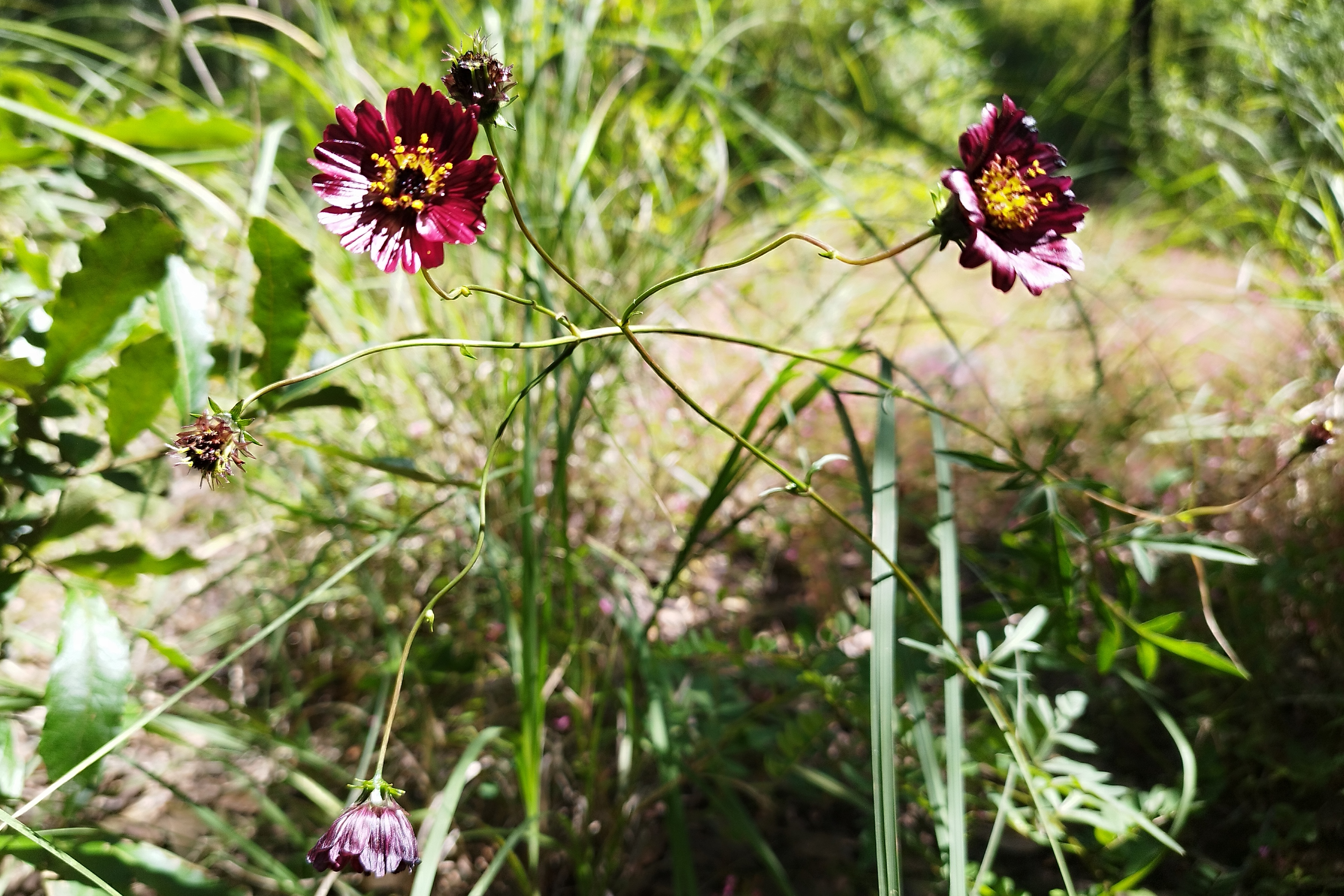
C. scabiosoides in Puebla, Mexico

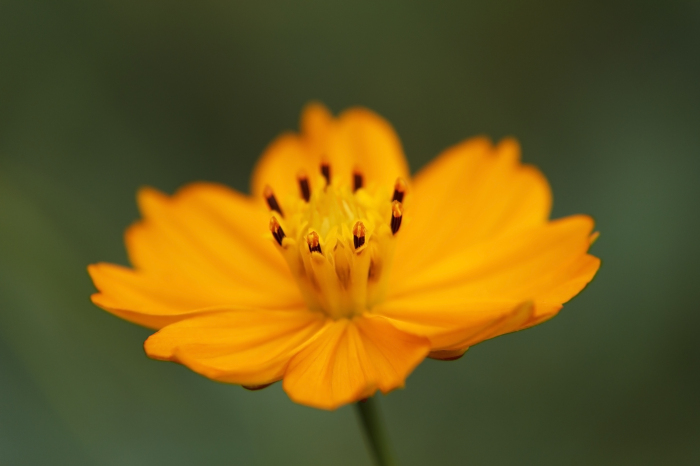
C. sulphureus

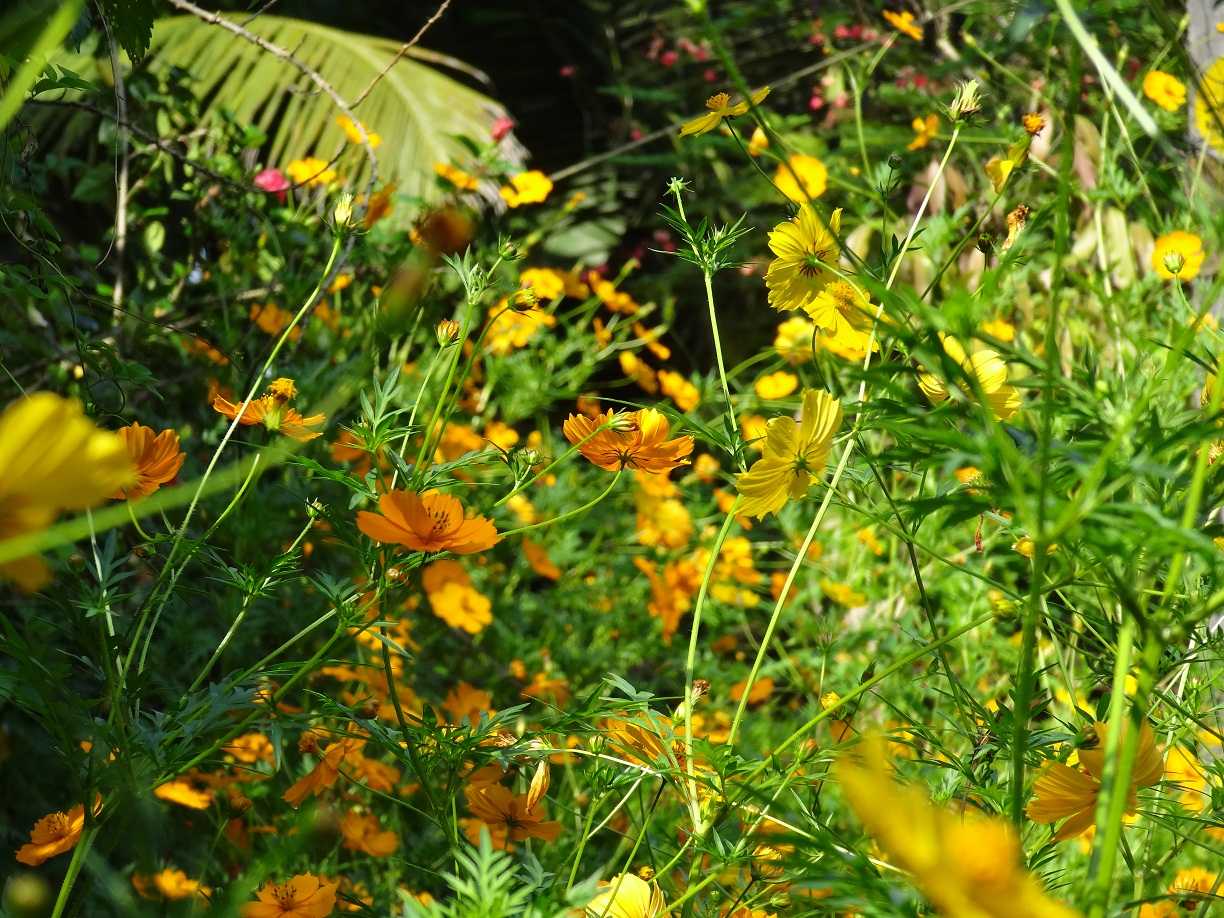
Kerala, India

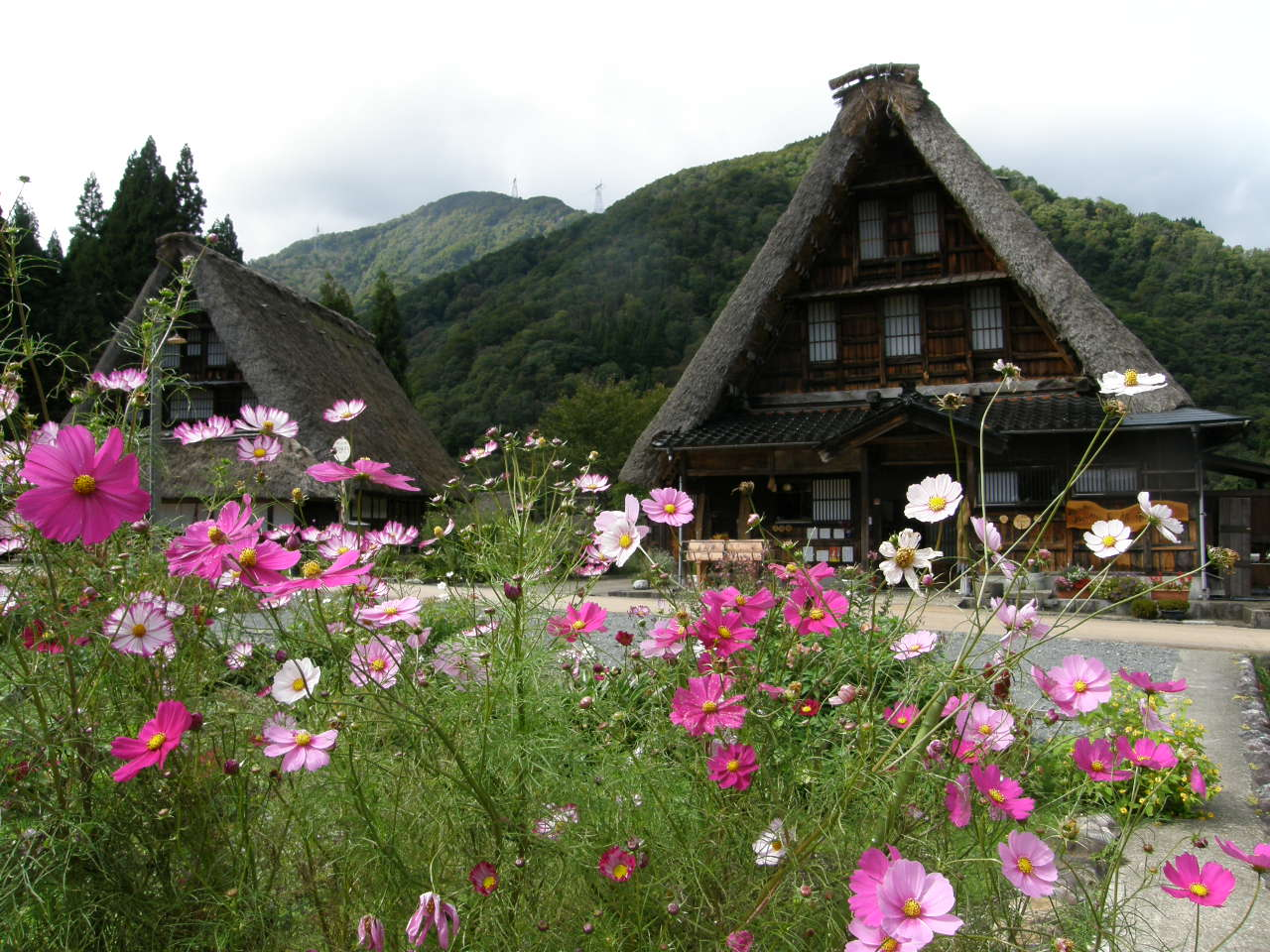
Old house in Japan

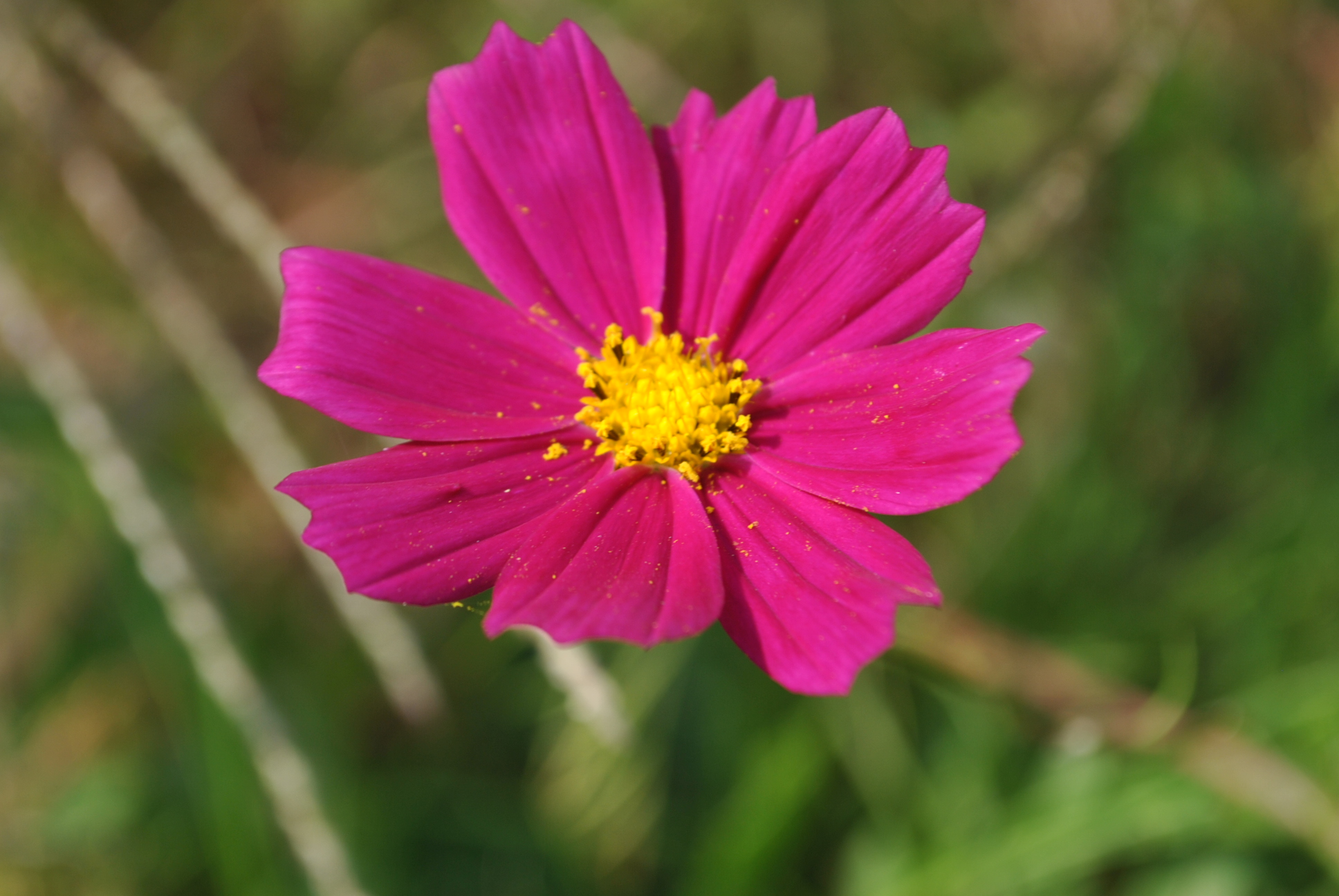
Korea

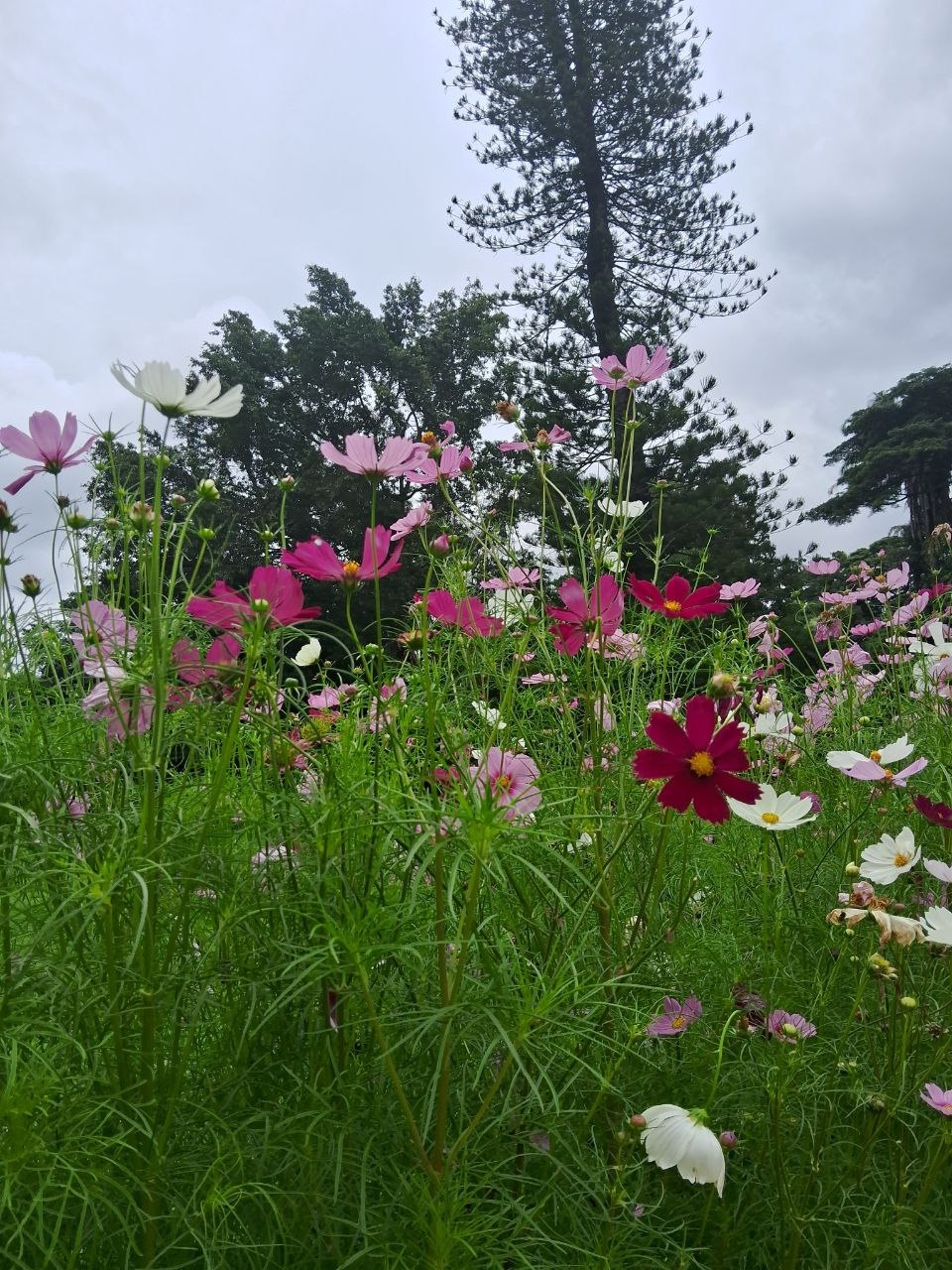
A group of cosmos flowers in the garden

Flag of the town of Villa Giardino, Argentina, featuring a cosmos flower in the centre
