= Kabau =

Kabau is an Indonesian common name for several plants and may refer to:

- Archidendron bubalinum
- Archidendron microcarpum
