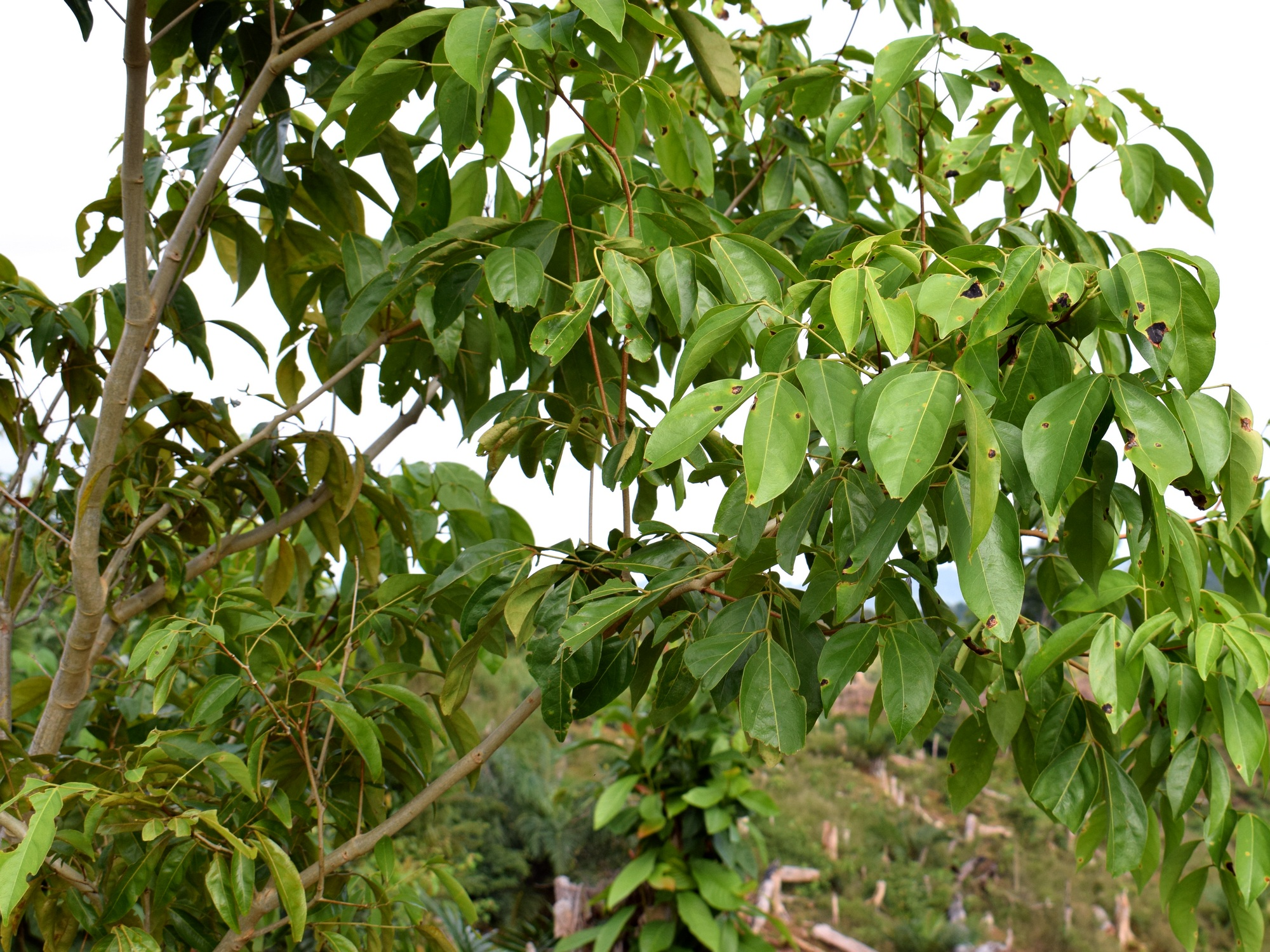
- Archidendron bubalinum sapling
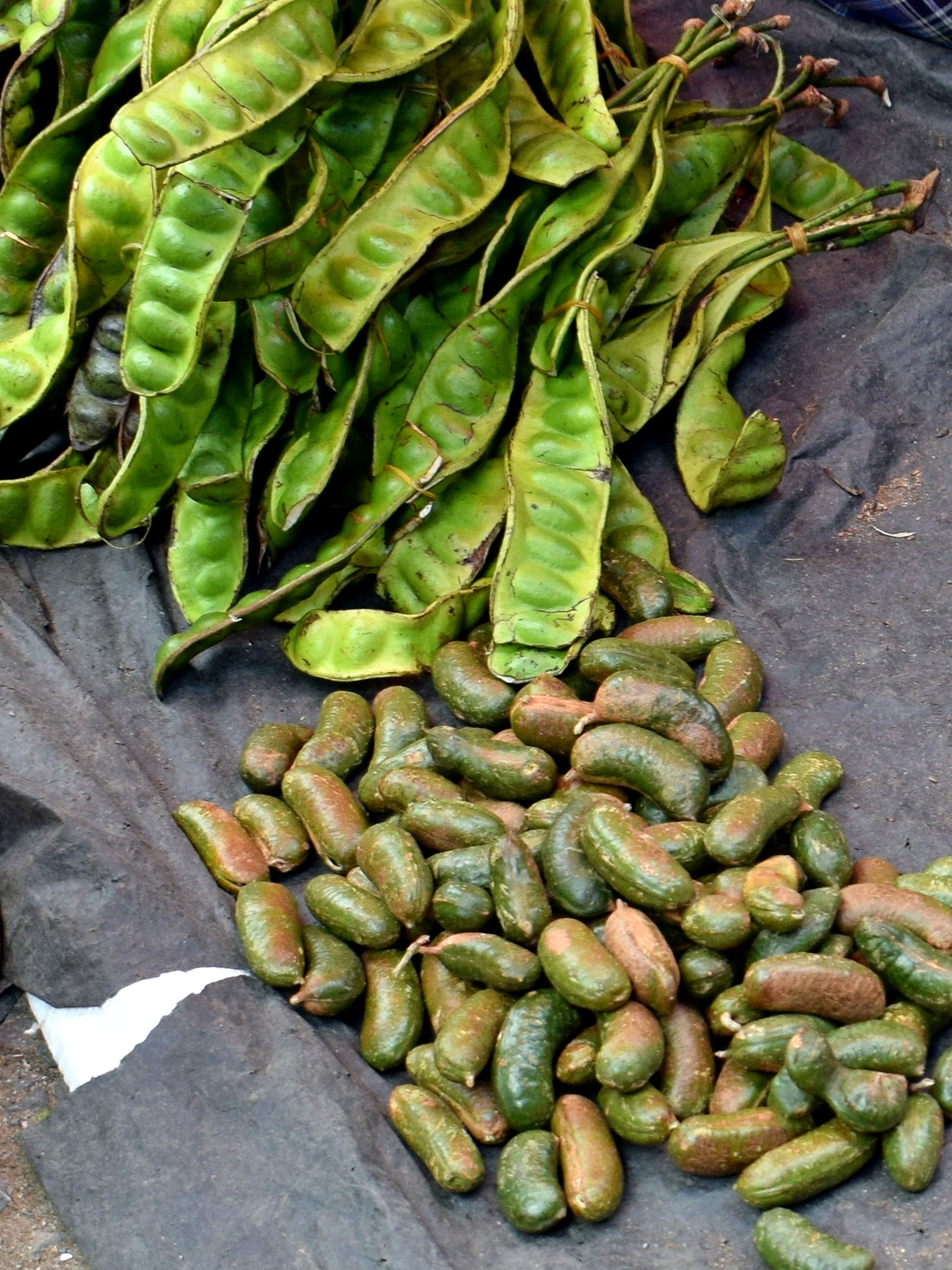
- Seed pods of Archidendron bubalinum (below) and Parkia speciosa (above)

Conservation status
- Least Concern (IUCN 3.1)

Scientific classification
- Kingdom: Plantae
- Clade: Embryophytes
- Clade: Tracheophytes
- Clade: Spermatophytes
- Clade: Angiosperms
- Clade: Eudicots
- Clade: Rosids
- Order: Fabales
- Family: Fabaceae
- Subfamily: Caesalpinioideae
- Clade: Mimosoid clade
- Genus: Archidendron
- Species: A. bubalinum

Binomial name
- Archidendron bubalinum (Jack) I.C.Nielsen

Synonyms
- List: Inga bubalina Jack; Albizia bubalina Jack (Kurz); Albizia acradena Miq.; Albizia acrodena Miq.; Pithecellobium bubalinum (Jack) Benth.; Pithecellobium bigeminum var. bubalinum (Jack) Benth.; Cylindrokelupha bubalina (Jack) Kosterm.; Feuilleea bubalina (Jack) O.Kuntze; Ortholobium bubalinum (Jack) Kosterm.

= Archidendron bubalinum =

Species of flowering plant

Archidendron bubalinum is a species of flowering plant in the family Fabaceae. Trees are leguminous and produce edible beans. It is found throughout the tropical forests of Southeast Asia, where the edible seeds or beans are important locally as a side dish or as an ingredient in traditional cuisine. Many parts of the plant are used medicinally to treat various diseases by communities across its range, and the wood is valuable in traditional carpentry and architecture as a source of lumber. It was described by William Jack in 1822.

== Description ==
=== Habit ===
Archidendron bubalinum is an unarmed tree with grey to grey-yellowish bark that grows up to 20-25 m in height, with a trunk that can reach upwards of 25 m in diameter. The branchlets are cylindrical and taper at the ends, reddish to light brown when dry, with a scaly, glabrescent (lacking hairs) to puberulous (very finely haired) outermost layer. The white to pale yellow sapwood, much like the twigs and seeds, are reported to smell like garlic when freshly cut.

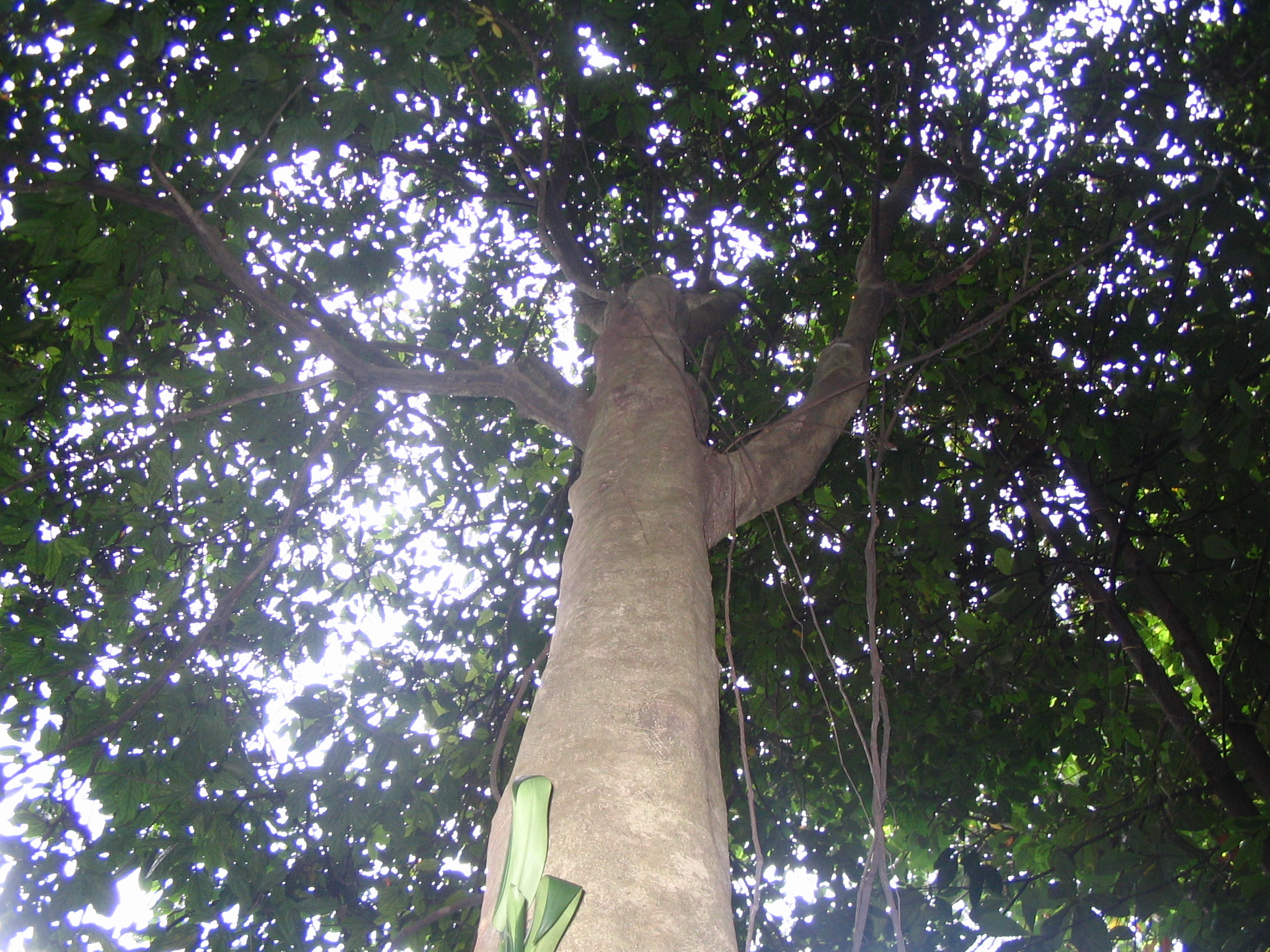
Trunk

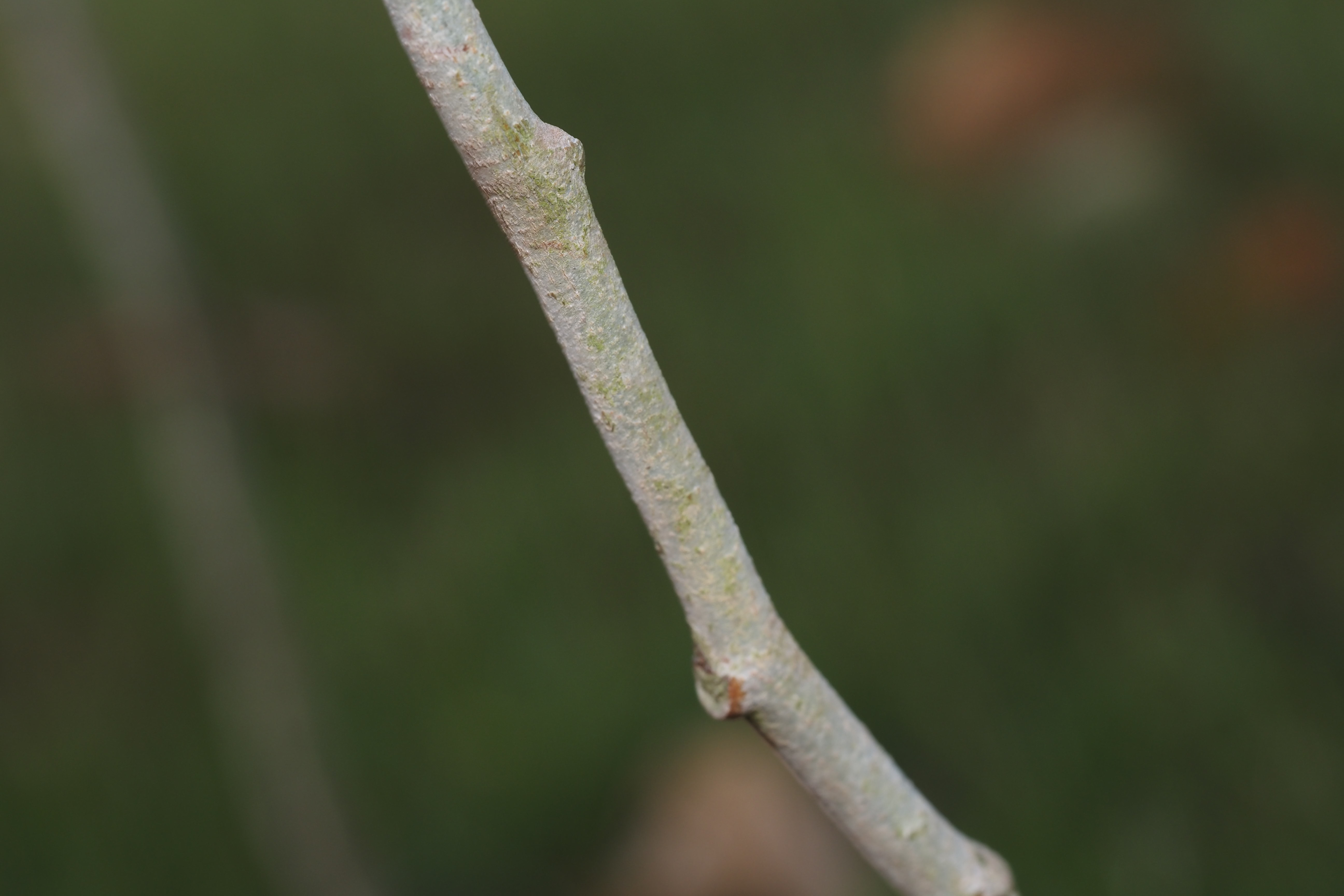
Grey bark of a sapling

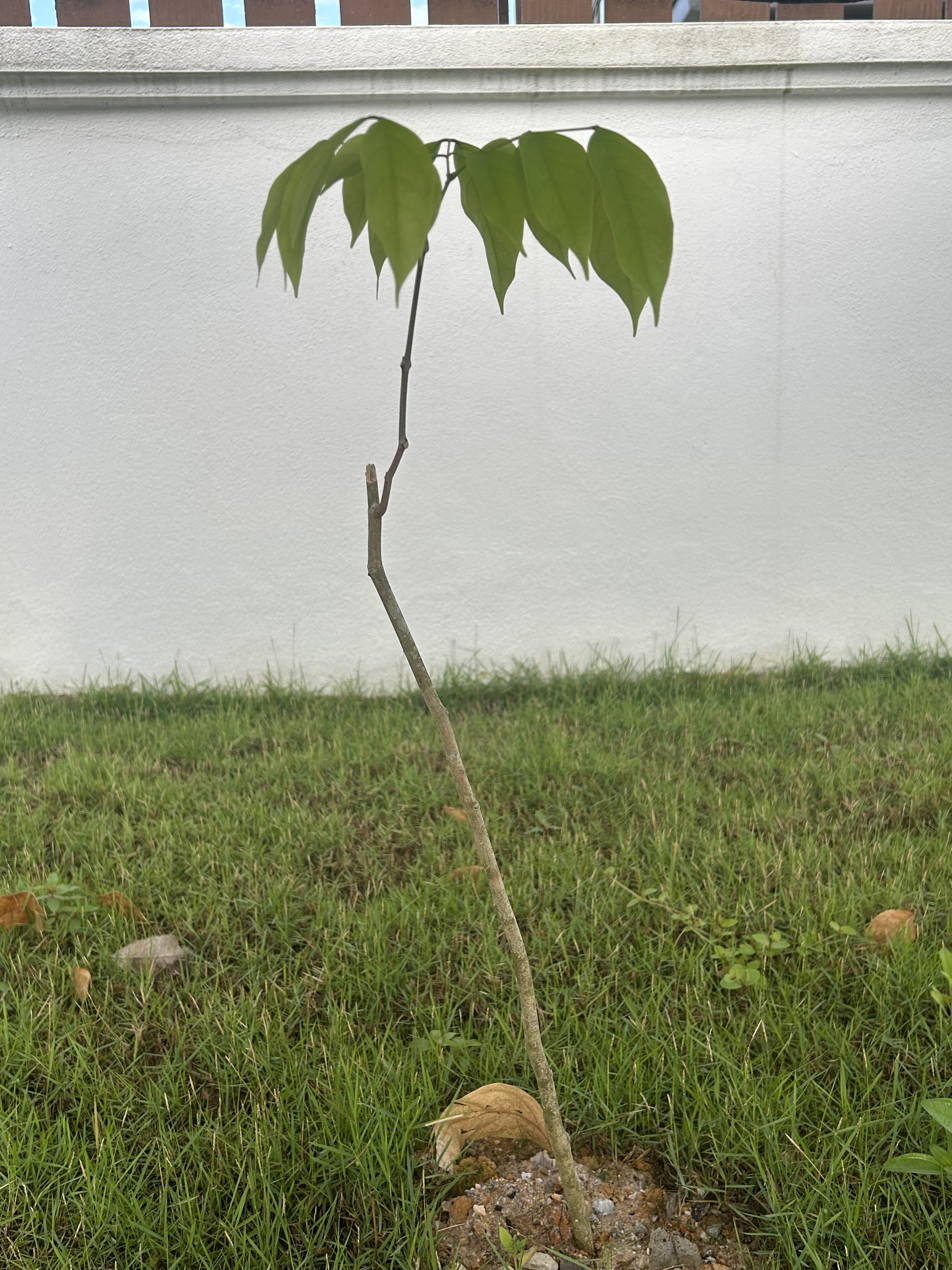
Sapling

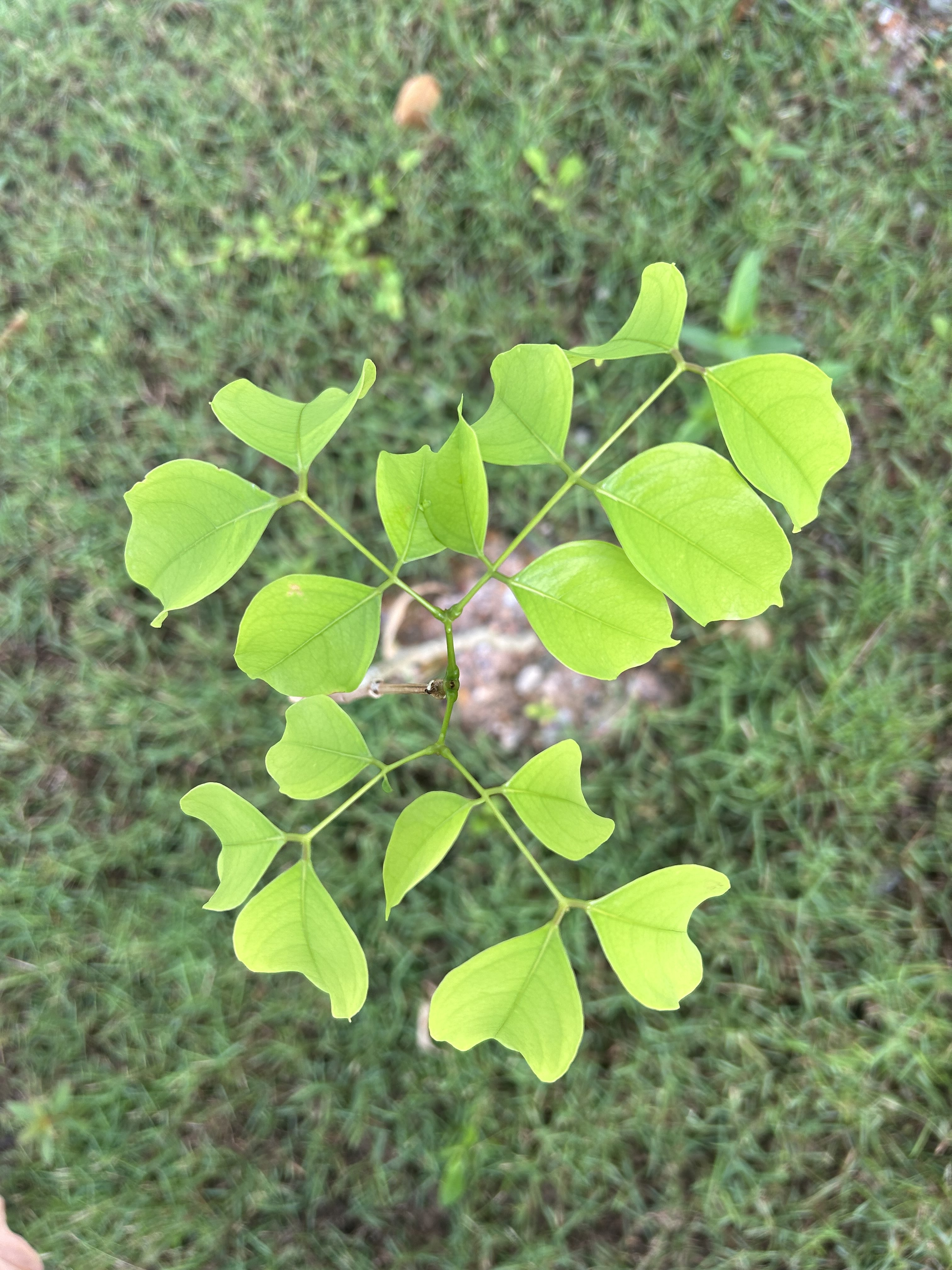
Two pairs of pinnate leaves

=== Leaves ===
Leaves are compound and arranged pinnately, each composed of 1–2 alternating pairs of soft, chartaceous (paper-like) and elliptic to ovate-elliptic leaflets. Each individual leaflet is supported by a petiolule and approximately 6–16 cm long by 3–8 cm wide. The base of the leaves are triangular and symmetrical, while the apex or ends of the leaves are broadly acuminate (tapered). Both surfaces of the leaflet are glabrous (hairless) and covered lightly with reticulate veins. Main veins are positioned centrally or nearly centrally on a leaflet, while lateral veins are prominulous (protrudes slightly) on both surfaces. The rachides present between each petiolule are around 0.5–4 cm long, though can sometimes reach up to 6 cm. Small glands, in particular extrafloral nectaries, are present below the junction of the leaves. Glands are also occasionally found on leaflets between the junctions of the petiolules. Aforementioned glands are circular, ranging from being sunken to semiglobular or flat in appearance and sessile.

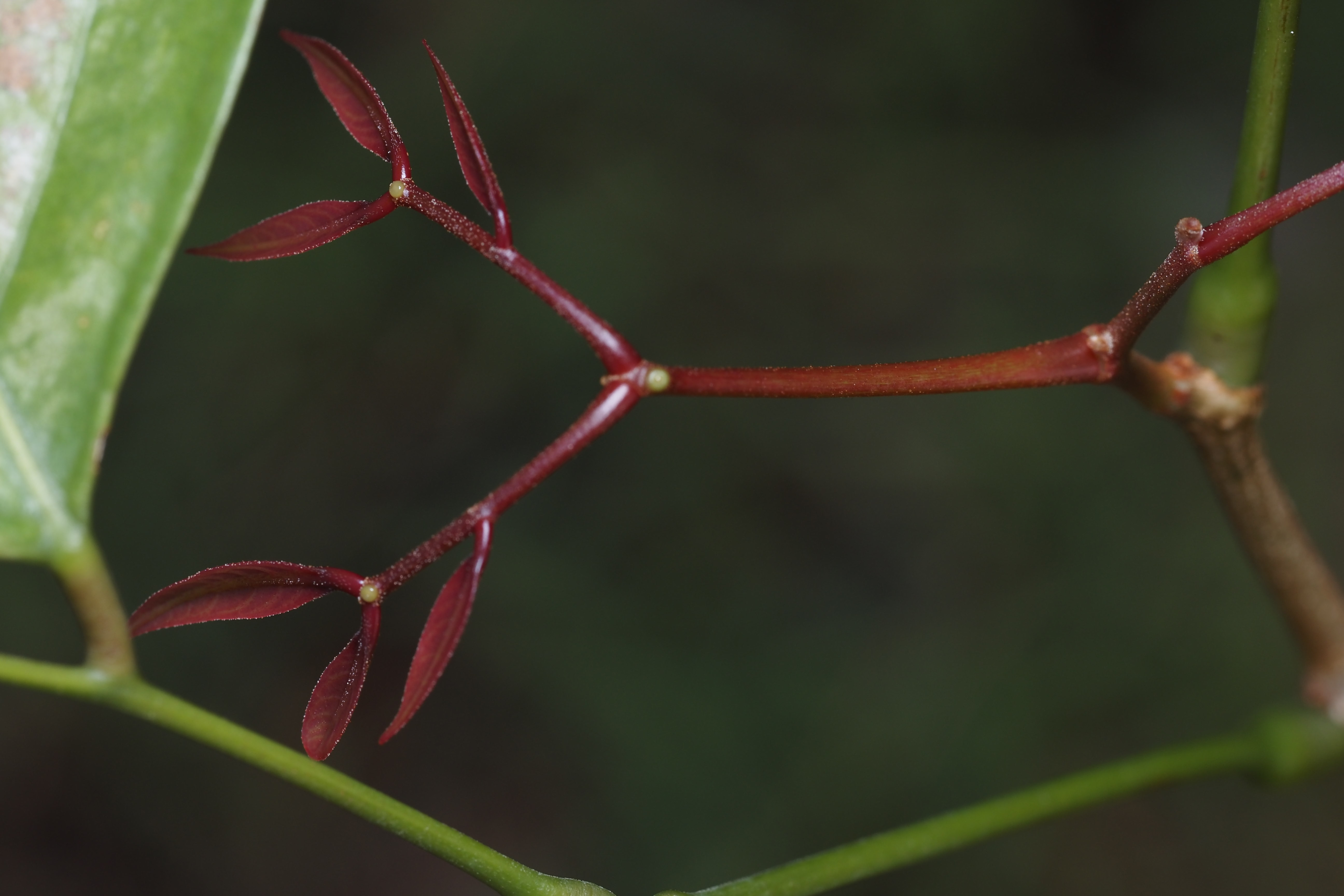
Young leaf

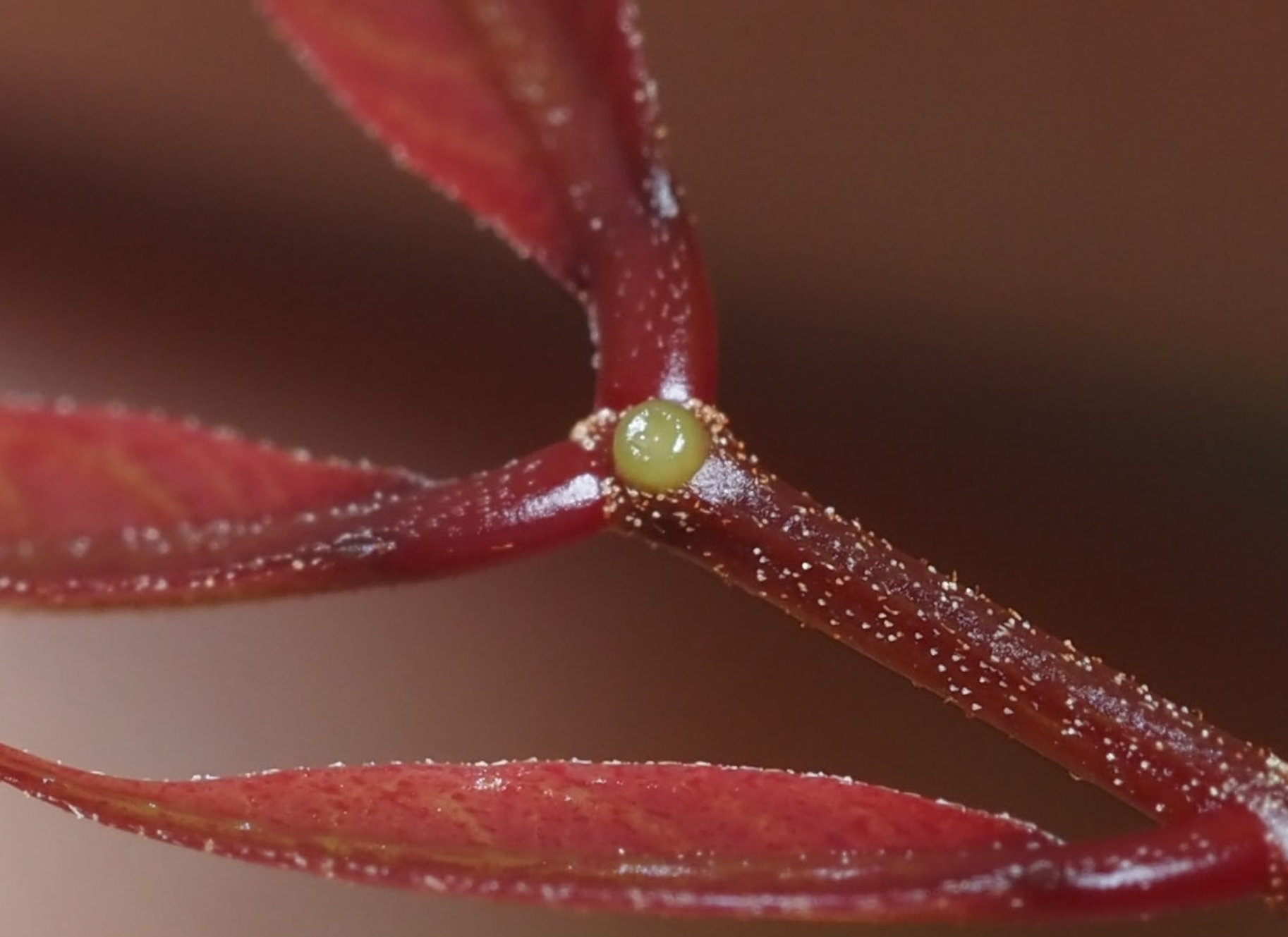
Extrafloral nectary occasionally found between the junctions of the petiolules of leaflets

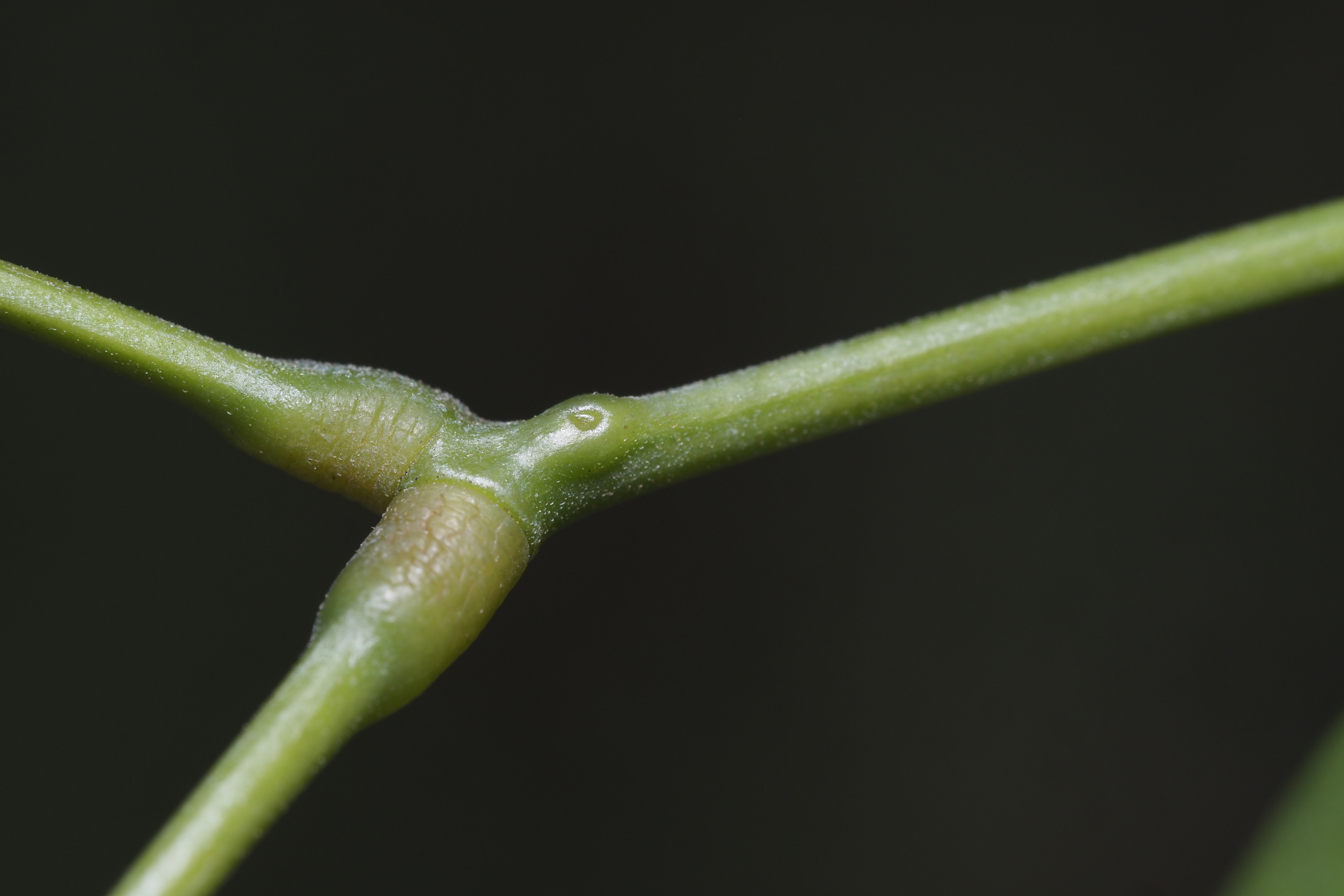
Extrafloral nectary found below the junction of leaves

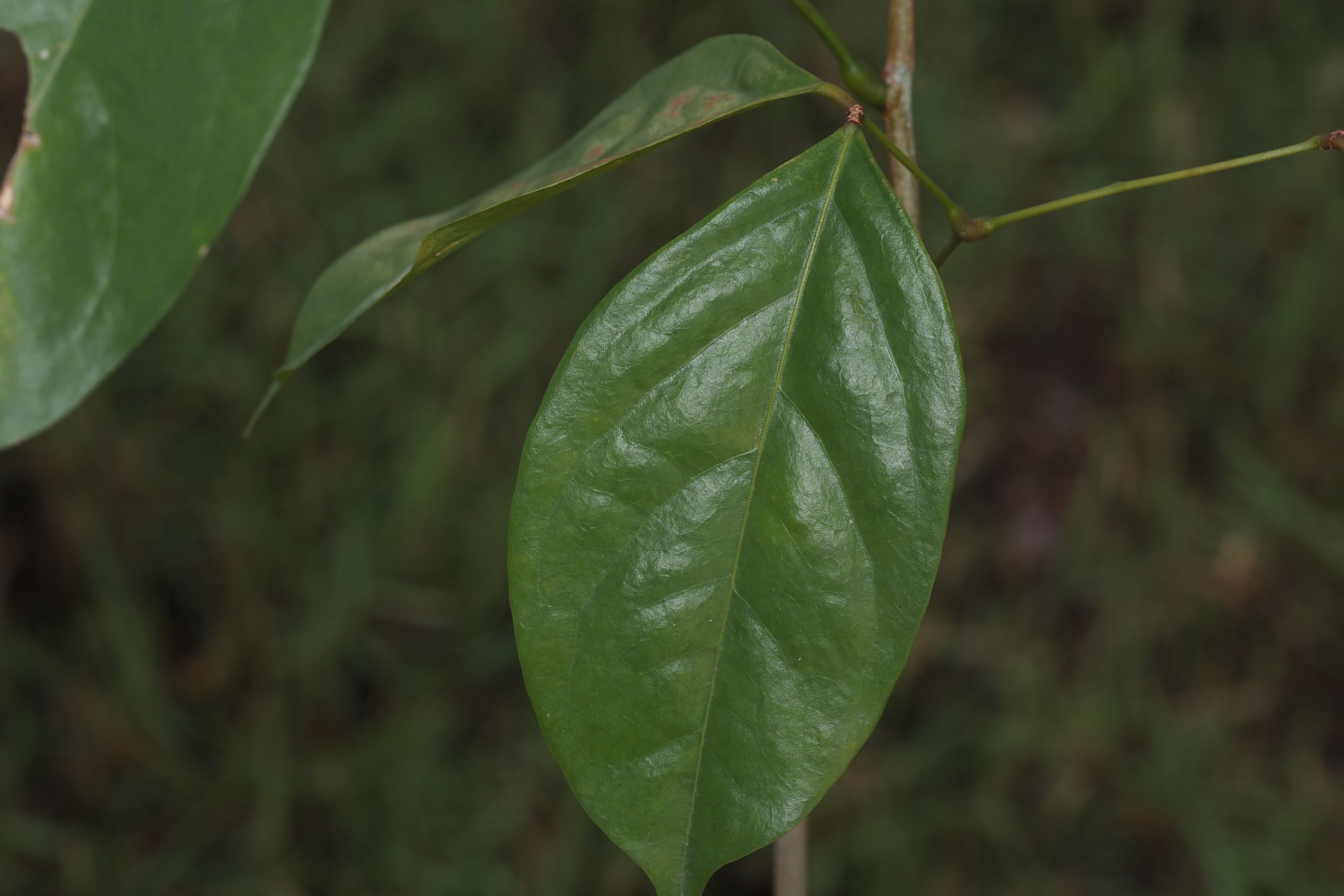
Dorsal view of leaflet, showing main and lateral veins

=== Inflorescence ===
Trees produce sweet-smelling inflorescences arranged in panicles that are usually around 1–2 cm in length and grow terminally on leaflets. Individual inflorescences contain around 5 small white to creamy yellow colored flowers that are pollinated by insects. Flowers can be subsessile, that is, attached to the inflorescence by a small pedicel to being completely sessile and lacking one. These pedicels can be up to 2 cm long. Each flower is composed of small campanulate (bell-shaped) to broadly funnel-shaped or funnel-shaped calyx and corolla. The calyxes, in specific, are 1.5–2.5 mm in length, with rusty-coloured tomentose (densely woolly) hairs and broadly triangular five-toothed ends that are 0.5 mm long each. The corollas, however, are larger at 2.5–5 mm long, puberulous and five-parted. Petals are triangular-ovate to narrowly elliptic in shape, often recurved and are each 2 mm long. Flowers also have white stamens that are partly fused at the base with staminal tubes equalling the length of the corolla tube. The ovaries of each flower are approximately 1 mm and glabrous (hairless), with a 1–3 mm long stipe.

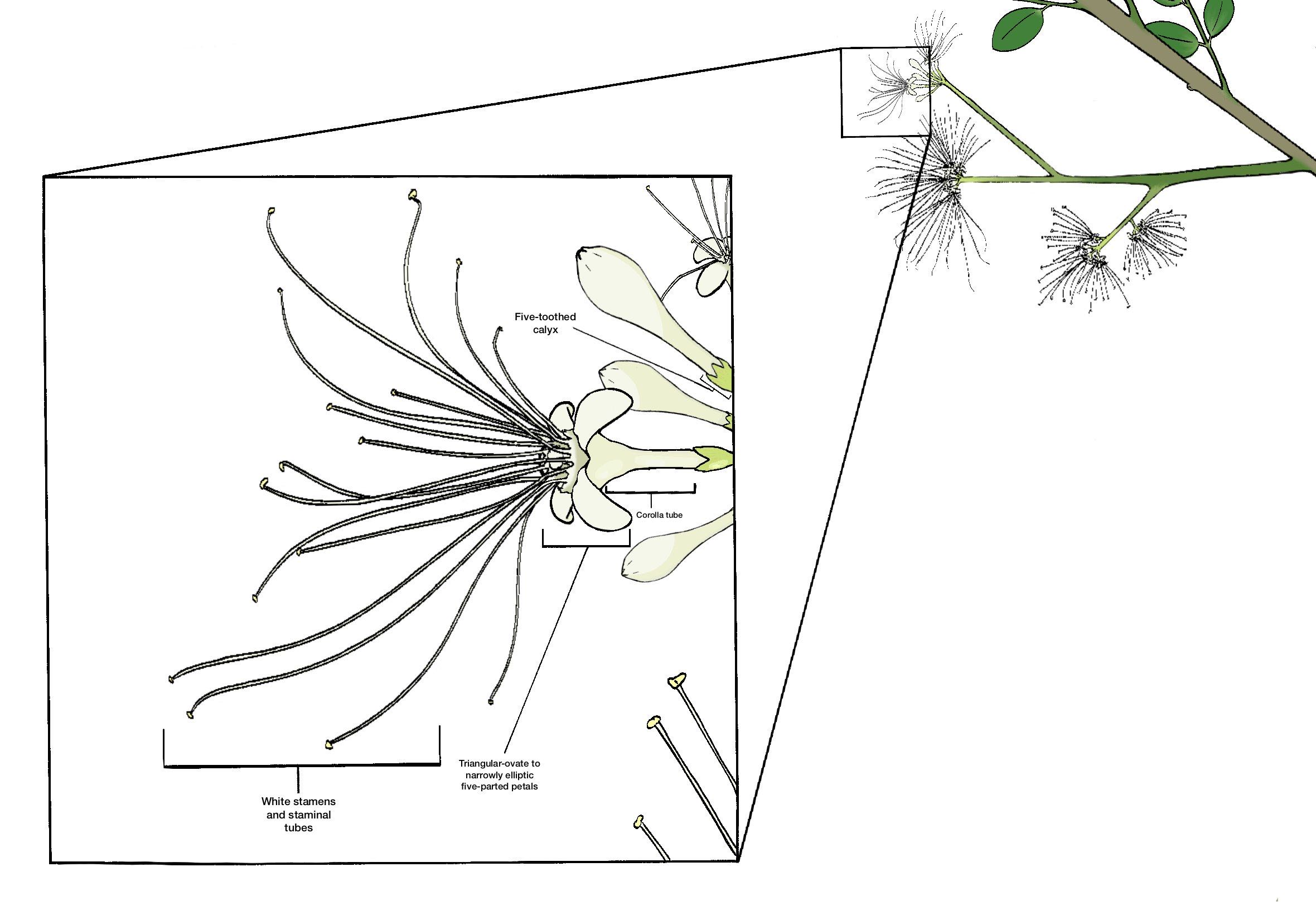
Diagram of a close-up flower of A. bubalinum

=== Pod ===
Seed pods are approximately 1.5 cm in diameter and 5–10 cm in length. They can vary from being straight to slightly curved and cylindrical to slightly compressed in shape. Pods have woody, greenish outsides with a densely puberulous (finely haired) or nearly glabrous (hairless) reddish inside and dehisce along both sutures. Seeds are thick and eliptical or discoid in shape, though terminal seeds are turbinate-truncate (inversely conical) and slightly compressed; both types of seed are around 1.5 cm in diameter. Testa (skin) of immature seeds are creamy yellow in color, while mature testa are black and cover the seeds in a thin, brittle shell. These seeds completely fill the entire cavity of the pod; the central seeds are around 1.2 cm thick, while terminal seeds are 1.5 cm in height. Seeds release a fetid odor comparable to the seeds of Parkia speciosa and Archidendron jiringa, but are edible and consumed in all stages of maturity.

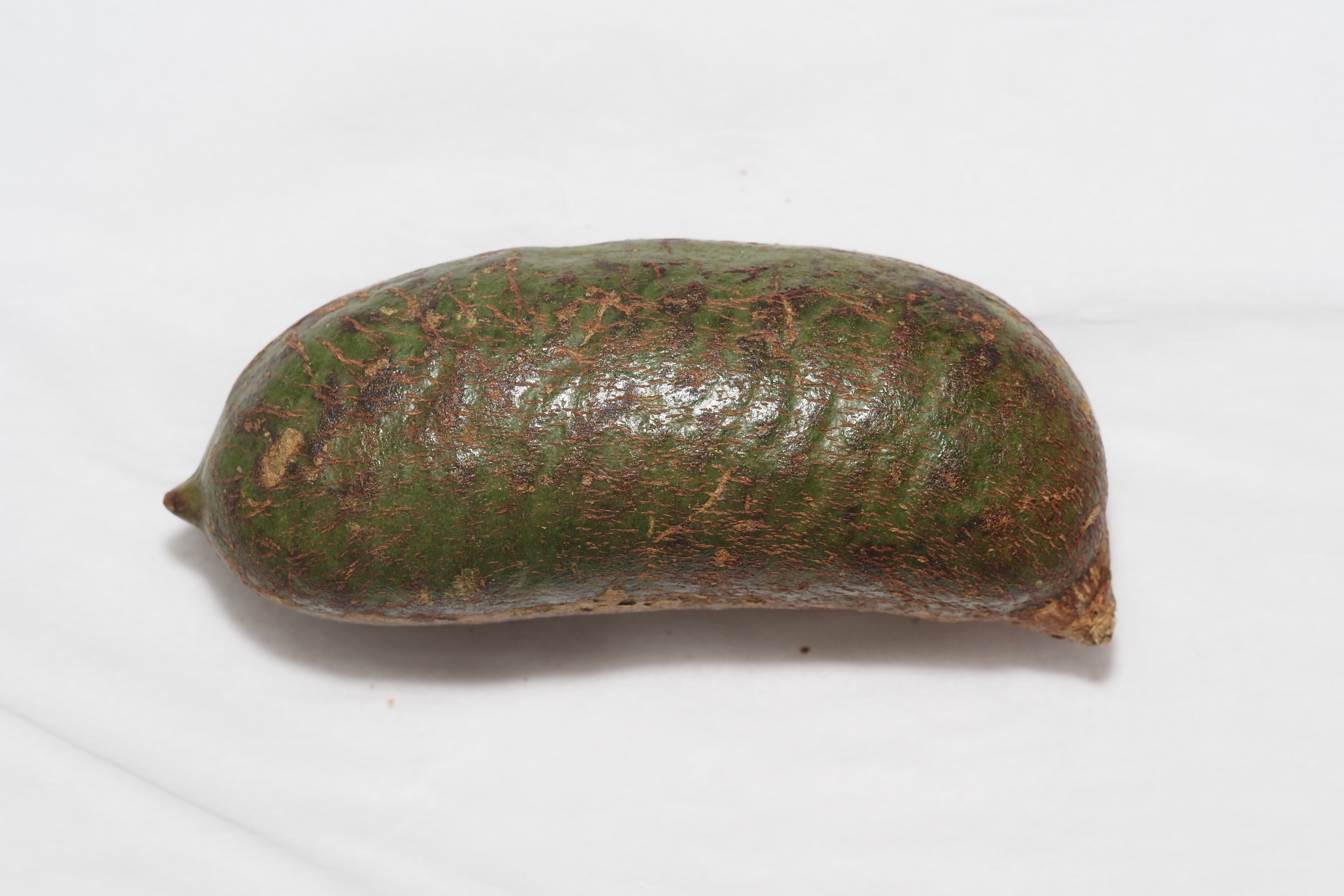
Unopened seed pod

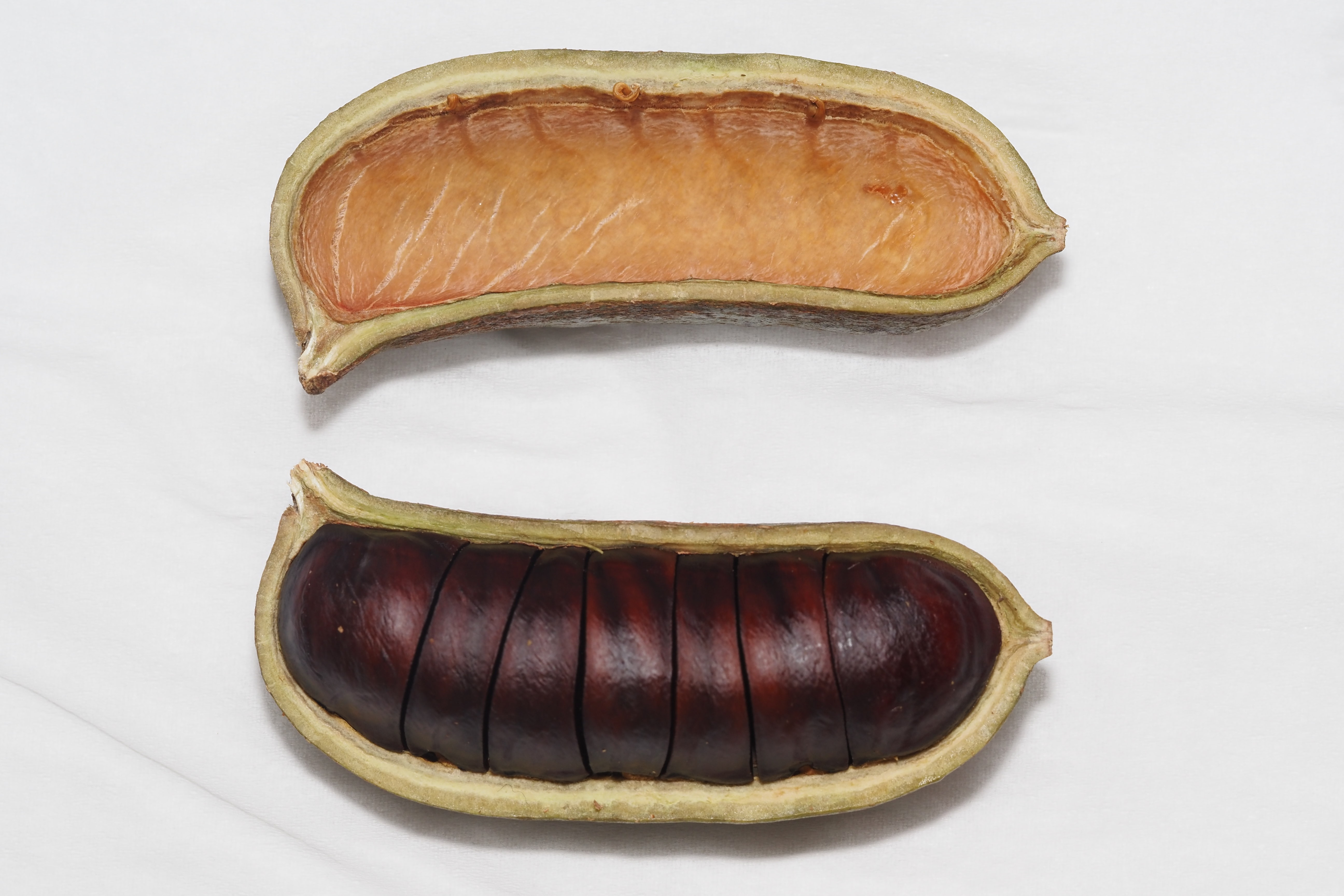
Open seed pod

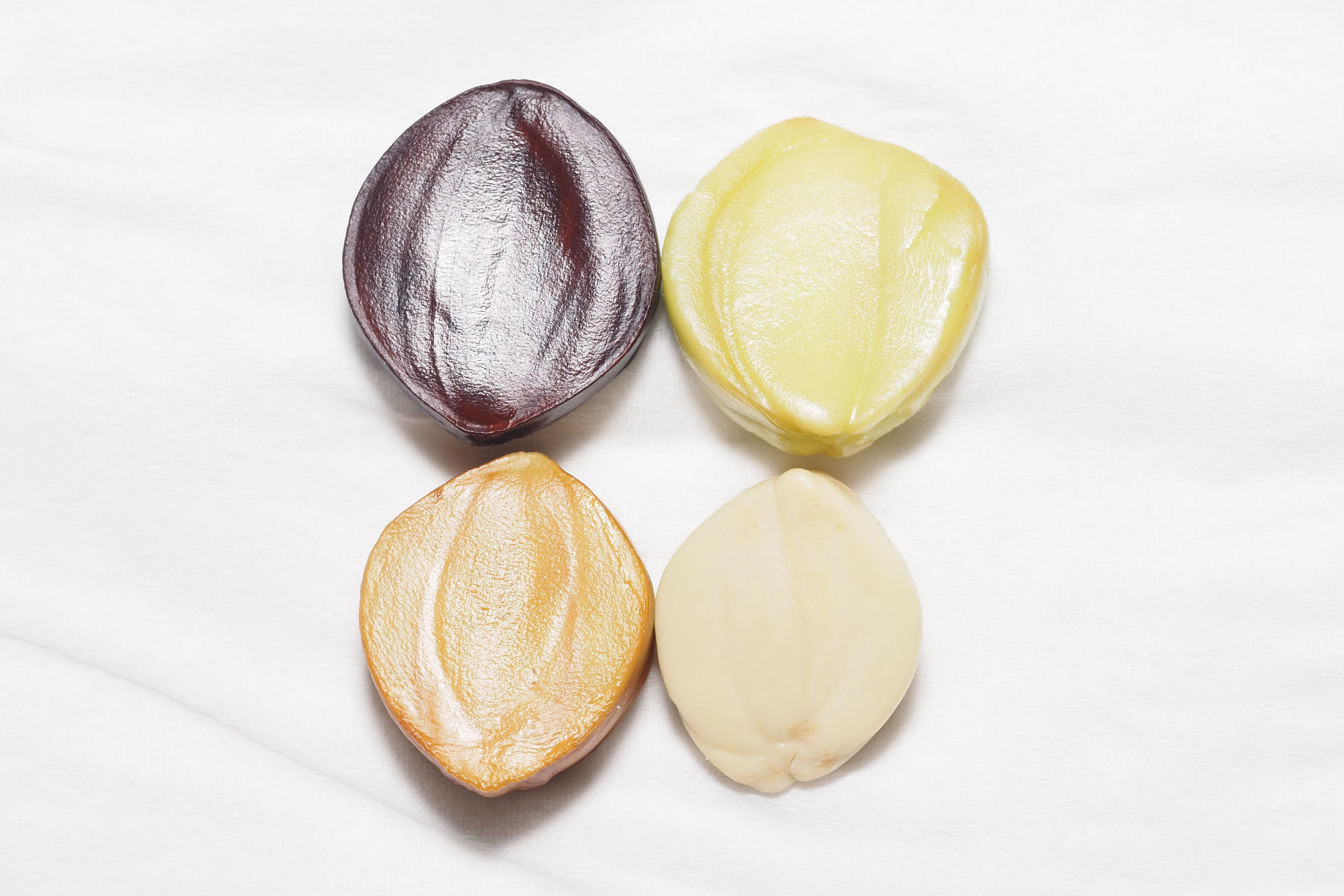
Seeds with testa and no testa

== Habitat and ecology ==
Archidendron bubalinum is native to the tropical forests of southern Thailand, Peninsular Malaysia and Sumatra, but has been introduced to Myanmar, the Andaman Islands and Bangladesh. Trees are usually found growing in lowland primary and secondary forest in sandy loam or lateritic soils. They normally inhabit areas with elevations up to 100 m, but sometimes ascend to elevations of 900 m. A. bubalinum is faced with the threat of habitat loss and decreasing population due to deforestation caused by palm oil plantations.

Trees of A. bubalinum often emerge in early regeneration forest or regrowth, becoming a dominant species within them. Inflorescences are reported to bloom from January to October. The seeds are dispersed by mammals, and along with the foliage, are a recorded food source for the Sumatran orangutan and the Tapanuli orangutan.

== Taxonomy ==
Archidendron bubalinum is a member of the likely polyphyletic Archidendron ser. Clypeariae whose members are mostly found throughout West Malesia, Mainland Southeast Asia and the Philippines. Its closest relative is Archidendron microcarpum.

- Clypeariae
  - A. bigeminum
  - - A. jiringa
    - - A. microcarpum
      - - A. bubalinum
  - - A. clypearia
    - - A. borneense

=== History ===
First described by Scottish botanist William Jack in 1822 with Sumatra as the type locality, it was placed in the genus Inga as Inga bubalina. The type specimen collected is now unknown regarding its whereabouts.

In 1844, English botanist George Bentham then combined Inga bubalina under Pithecellobium bigeminum var. bubalinum, mistakenly based on a specimen of Archidendron microcarpum collected in Penang. However, he believed the seed pod from that specimen belonged to a species of Cassia, near Cassia fistula. This classification was then revised in 1875 when Bentham accepted the pod as belonging to the specimen, while also referring to two other specimens, renamed Pithecellobium bigeminum var. bubalinum as Pithecellobium bubalinum. Tangentially, in 1876, German botanist Wilhelm Sulpiz Kurz misinterpreted Pithecellobium bubalinum as a member of genus Albizzia. Based on it and an additional two different specimens, one actually being a specimen of Archidendron bigeminum from the Nicobar Islands, he referred Pithecellobium bubalinum under Albizzia bubalina.

In a taxonomic revision of the genera Archidendron and Pithecellobium by Danish botanist Ivan Christian Nielsen in 1979, multiple species that were formerly in Pithecellobium were moved to Archidendron. This move included the transfer and renaming of Pithecellobium bubalinum to Archidendron bubalinum.

=== Nomenclature and etymology ===
A. bubalinum is known in Malaysia as kerdas, keredas antan, genuak, or gerduak and in Indonesia as kabau or jolang-jaling.

The specific epithet is from Latin (būbalīna; būbalīnum), derived from its local Malay name, which also means water buffalo (karbau).

== Uses ==
=== Traditional medicine ===
Consumption of the seeds are believed to detoxify the kidneys, help with urinal incontinence by acting as a diuretic, constipation, prevent or lower the risk of diabetes. They are also believed to aid in regulating blood sugar, controlling hypertension, preserving youthfulness, while also reducing the risk of cardiovascular diseases and certain cancers. The bark is also used medicinally, namely as a febrifuge.

In some areas of Indonesia, it is used as a remedy to treat coughs and diseases like smallpox and gout. However, in Malaysia, certain communities of Orang Asli like the Temuan use the roots and seeds as medicine to treat diabetes. The roots are decocted and the seeds are eaten raw, both unripe and ripe, to prevent urination that is believed to be fatal. It is also used for this purpose by the Jambi people in Sumatra by dry roasting cooked seeds, finely grounding them, and then mixing the ground seeds with water. This mixture is drunk two times a day.

=== Culinary ===
==== Nutritional value ====
Fresh Archidendron bubalinum beans
Nutritional value per 100 g (3.5 oz)
- Energy: 130 kcal (540 kJ)
- Carbohydrates: 25.2 g
- Dietary fibre: 2.9 g
- Fat: 0.3 g
- Protein: 6.7 g
Amino acids
Threonine	9 mg
Isoleucine	4.45 mg
Leucine	7.8 mg
Lysine	9.9 mg
Methionine	0.9 mg
Phenylalanine	4.42 mg
Tyrosine	9.9 mg
Valine	4 mg
Arginine	4 mg
Histidine	4.1 mg
Alanine	3 mg
Aspartic acid	11.3 mg
Glutamic acid	17.3 mg
Glycine	6 mg
Serine	10.5 mg
Vitamins and minerals
Vitamins	Quantity %DV^{†}
Vitamin A equiv. beta-Carotene	2% 165 μg
Thiamine (B1)	67% 0.8 mg
Riboflavin (B2)	8% 0.1 mg
Niacin (B3)	2% 0.3 mg
Vitamin C	18% 16 mg
Minerals	Quantity %DV^{†}
Calcium	0% 4 mg
Copper	22% 0.2 mg
Iron	3% 0.5 mg
Phosphorus	16% 204 mg
Potassium	13% 397.8 mg
Sodium	0% 1 mg
Zinc	5% 0.5 mg
- Other constituents: Quantity
- Water: 67.2 g
- ^{†}Percentages estimated using US recommendations for adults, except for potassium, which is estimated based on expert recommendation from the National Academies.

Fresh seeds have a high moisture content, low fat content, and high crude protein content of 6-10% (fresh weight), but a poor chemical score of 32% due to having low amounts of valine and methionine. They are rich in both essential amino acids like threonine and lysine and non-essential amino acids such as aspartic acid and glutamic acid.

The seeds also contain a significant amount of antinutrients, with a tannin content of 0.0002 mg, a trypsin inhibitor content of 0.25 TIU/mg, and a phytic acid content of 2.02 mg in dry matter. Hemagglutinins have also been detected in the seeds.

==== Food ====
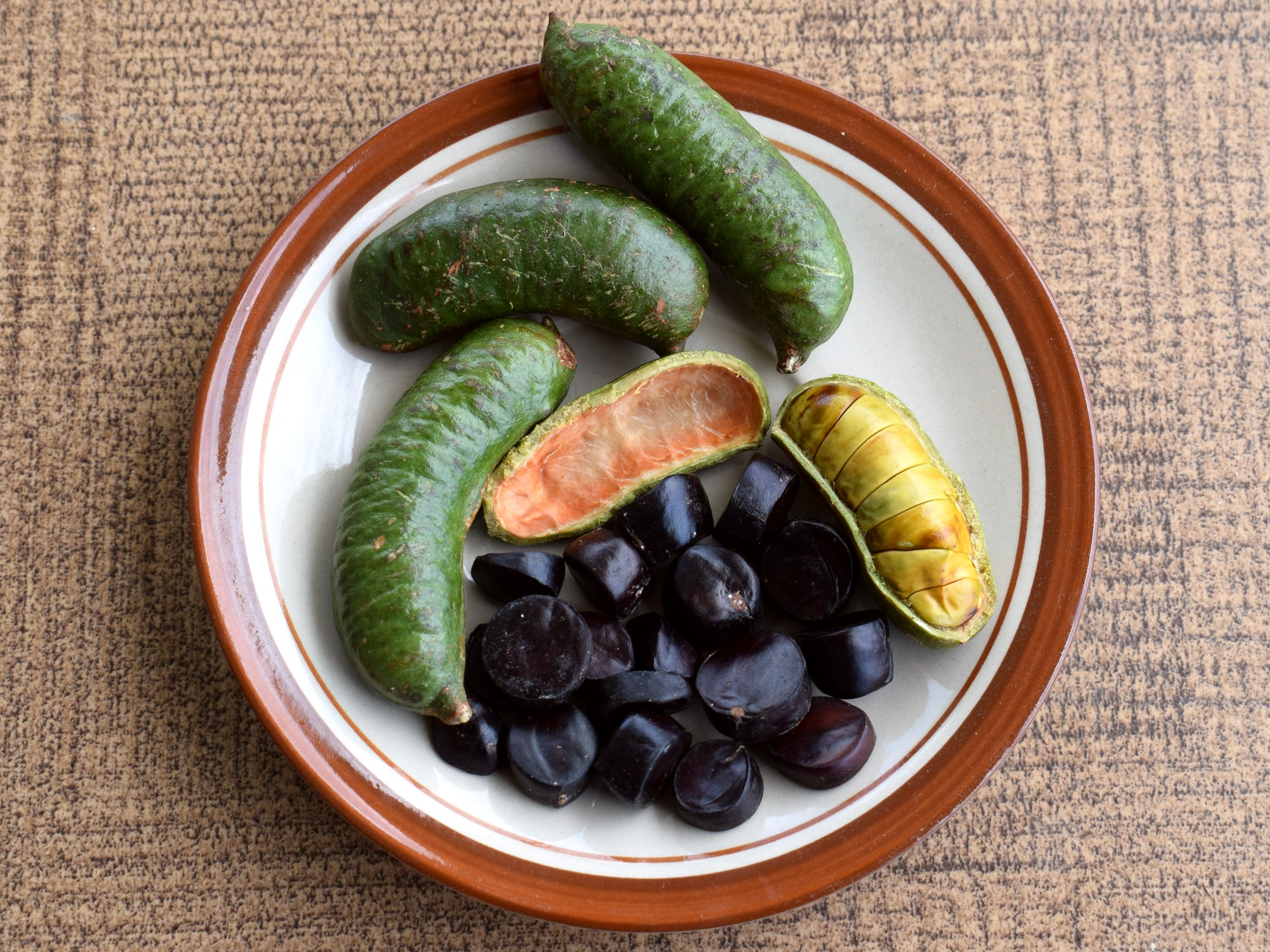
Seeds and seed pods of Archidendron bubalinum served on a plate

Young seeds are traditionally eaten by locals in Malaysia and Indonesia as an appetiser or side dish in the form of a salad known as ulam. They can also be prepared by boiling or frying the seeds, which are then seasoned with salt and spices. Mature seeds are usually roasted and ground and used as a condiment in certain Padang and Malay influenced dishes like curries, gulai, and sambal. Some communities consume sprouted seeds, locally referred to lahang, to reduce the smell. The young leaflets are also eaten as a salad as it has the same aroma profile as the beans. The seeds of this species are less preferred in younger generations due to its off-putting smell.

Similarly to its relative Archidendron jiringa, djenkolic acid, a non-proteinogenic amino acid is present in large amounts within the seeds. Due to its toxic effects, it has to be removed from the seeds via boiling them two or three times.

=== Other uses ===
The tree provides hard, durable wood that is valued in traditional architecture for making canoes, canoe paddles, houseposts, kitchen utensils, knife handles, scabbards, boxes and coffins. It is also used as fuel. The foliage however can be used as animal feed for livestock.

== Gallery ==
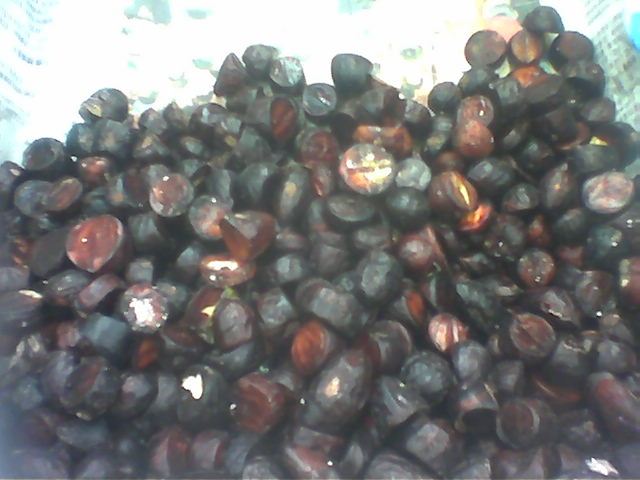
Pile of mature seeds

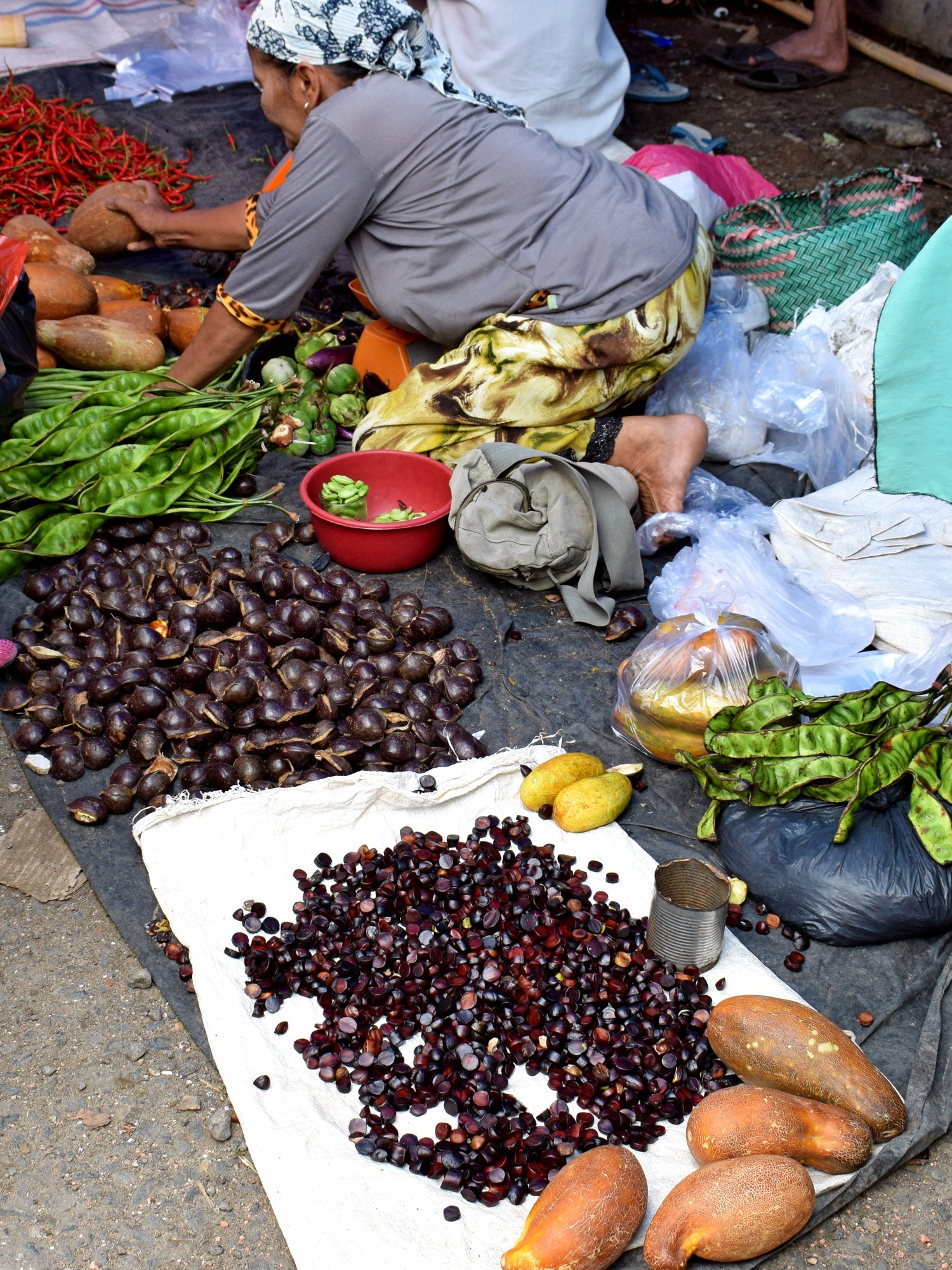
Seeds of Archidendron bubalinum being sold in a market in Bengkulu, Sumatra.

== See also ==
- Legume
