= Ulam (salad) =

Traditional Malay salad

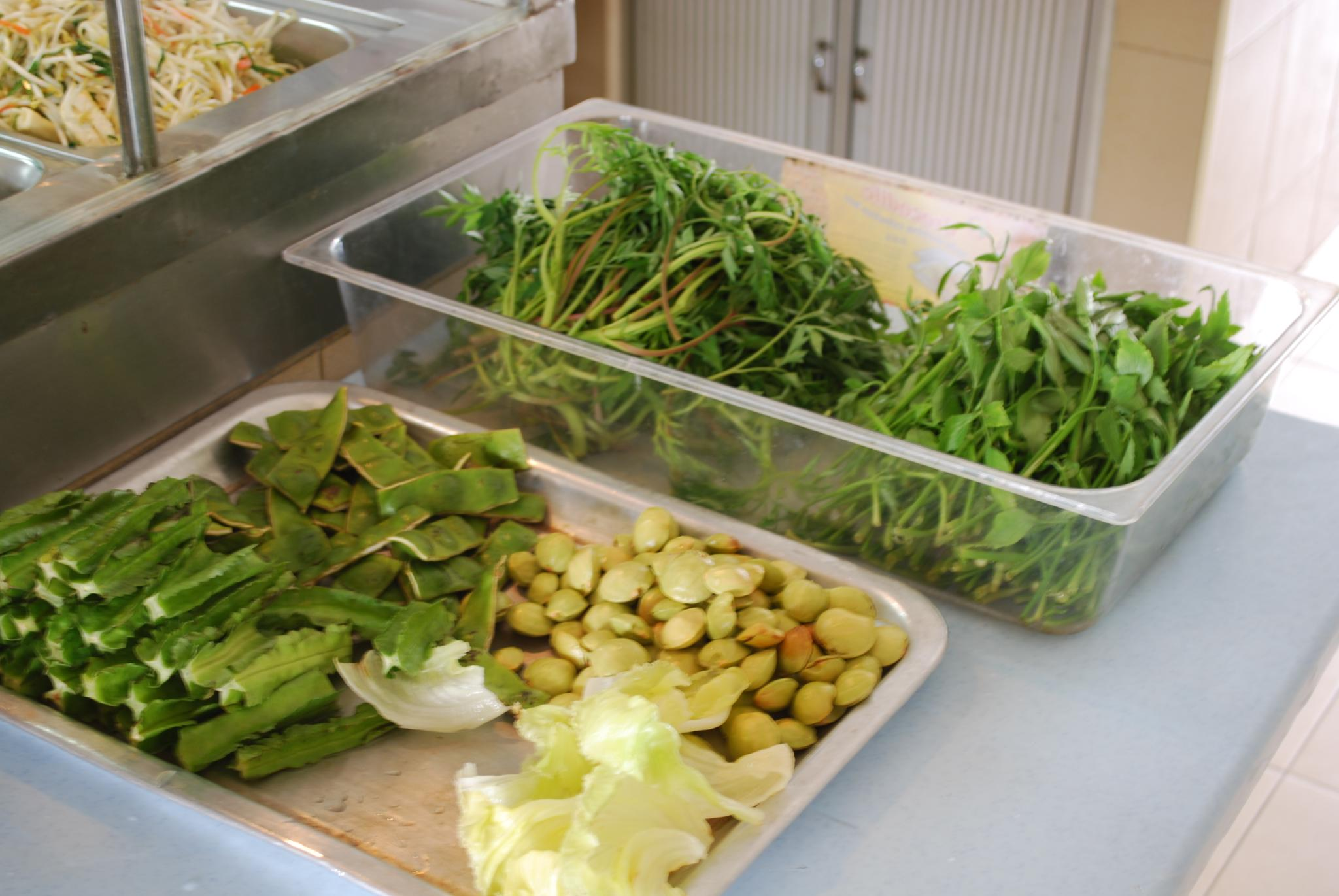
- Raw ulam greens.
- Type: Salad
- Associated cuisine: Indonesia, Malaysia and Singapore
- Created by: Malays
- Main ingredients: vegetables
- Similar dishes: Lalab, Ngapi yay, Nam phrik

Ulam (Jawi: اولم) is a traditional Malay salad produced from foraged leaves, vegetables or fruits which can be eaten raw or blanched e.g. Centella asiatica. It is typically eaten with sauces such as budu, cincalok or sambal. It is popular in rural villages.

Ulam can be eaten simply as it is such as cucumber, cabbage and longbean; they can be also made as ingredients to other dishes, whether in rice dishes such as nasi ulam and nasi kerabu, or with other vegetables. It also has its uses in Ayurvedic and traditional medicine, such as diabetes and high blood pressure.

== Etymology and definition ==
The Malay word ulam derives from Proto-Malayic *hulam, which traces back to the Proto-Malayo-Polynesian *qulam, historically meaning "side dish". This term is first attested in Western lexicons of Malay as olam from Jacob Corneliszoon van Neck's Vocabulaer compiled in Ternate in 1598.

The term encompasses various edible plant parts, including shoots (pucuk), leaves (daun), stems (batang), pods or seeds (biji), fruits (buah), tubers (ubi), and flowers (bunga). While it is traditionally a staple of rural Malay communities, it has become increasingly popular in urban areas. To enhance the flavor of the raw or blanched (celur) vegetables, they are typically paired with traditional dipping sauces (cecahan) such as sambal belacan, budu, or cencaluk; and served alongside rice and other main dishes.

== Health benefits ==
Because ulam is largely consumed raw or only briefly blanched, its essential heat-sensitive nutrients—including fiber, vitamins, and minerals like calcium (Ca), phosphorus (P), iron (Fe), sodium (Na), and potassium (K)—remain intact. For example, wild betel leaf (daun kaduk) contains particularly high levels of calcium and iron compared to other local greens.

In traditional Malay medicine, various types of ulam are consumed for targeted health benefits:

- Pegaga (Centella asiatica): Recognized by the World Health Organization (WHO) for its potential to support cognitive function, improve blood circulation, and maintain skin health.
- Jering (Archidendron jiringa): Contains specific alkaloid compounds that act as a natural diuretic and have traditionally been used to help manage blood sugar levels in diabetes.
- Daun Kaduk (Piper sarmentosum): Rich in calcium, traditionally consumed to help strengthen bone density.

== Classification and types ==
More than 120 plant species across various families are consumed as ulam in Malaysia, ranging from small annual herbs to massive perennial rainforest trees like stink bean (petai) and kerdas (Archidendron bubalinum). They are generally classified into four main categories based on market availability and origin:

- Popular ulam: Highly accessible, frequently cultivated, or found growing wild in both urban and rural areas e.g. ulam raja (Cosmos), pegaga, and bitter melon.
- Less popular ulam: Rarely found in commercial supermarkets but occasionally available at local weekly farmers' markets (pasar tani). These are often foraged or harvested from backyard trees (e.g., cashew and mango shoots).
- Traditional ulam: Indigenous species that have been historically consumed by native populations for generations, typically growing in kampung settings or forests (e.g., jering and petai).
- Non-traditional ulam: Introduced or cultivated agricultural crops that are simply eaten raw as a side dish rather than cooked (e.g., cucumber, cabbage, and long beans).

=== Categories by plant structure ===
Based on traditional agricultural classifications, ulam can be grouped by the physical structure of the source plant:

Plant type	Common examples
Trees	Cashew shoots (pucuk gajus), jering, kerdas, petai, neem (mambu) leaves, and star gooseberry (cermai).
Small trees & shrubs	Papaya leaves (pucuk betik), moringa (kelur), noni leaves (mengkudu), curry leaves, and banana blossom (jantung pisang).
Palms & bamboos	Bamboo shoots (rebung buluh madu), coconut or bayas palm pith (umbut).
Herbs & leafy vegetables	Ulam raja, pegaga, sweet leaf (cekur manis), water dropwort (selom), wild betel (kaduk), laksa leaf (kesum), and ginger rhizomes.
Creepers & vines	Winged bean (kacang botor), long beans, ivy gourd, cucumber, and bitter melon (peria katak).

== See also ==
- Malay cuisine
- List of salads
- Lalab
- Pecel
- Rojak
- Urap
