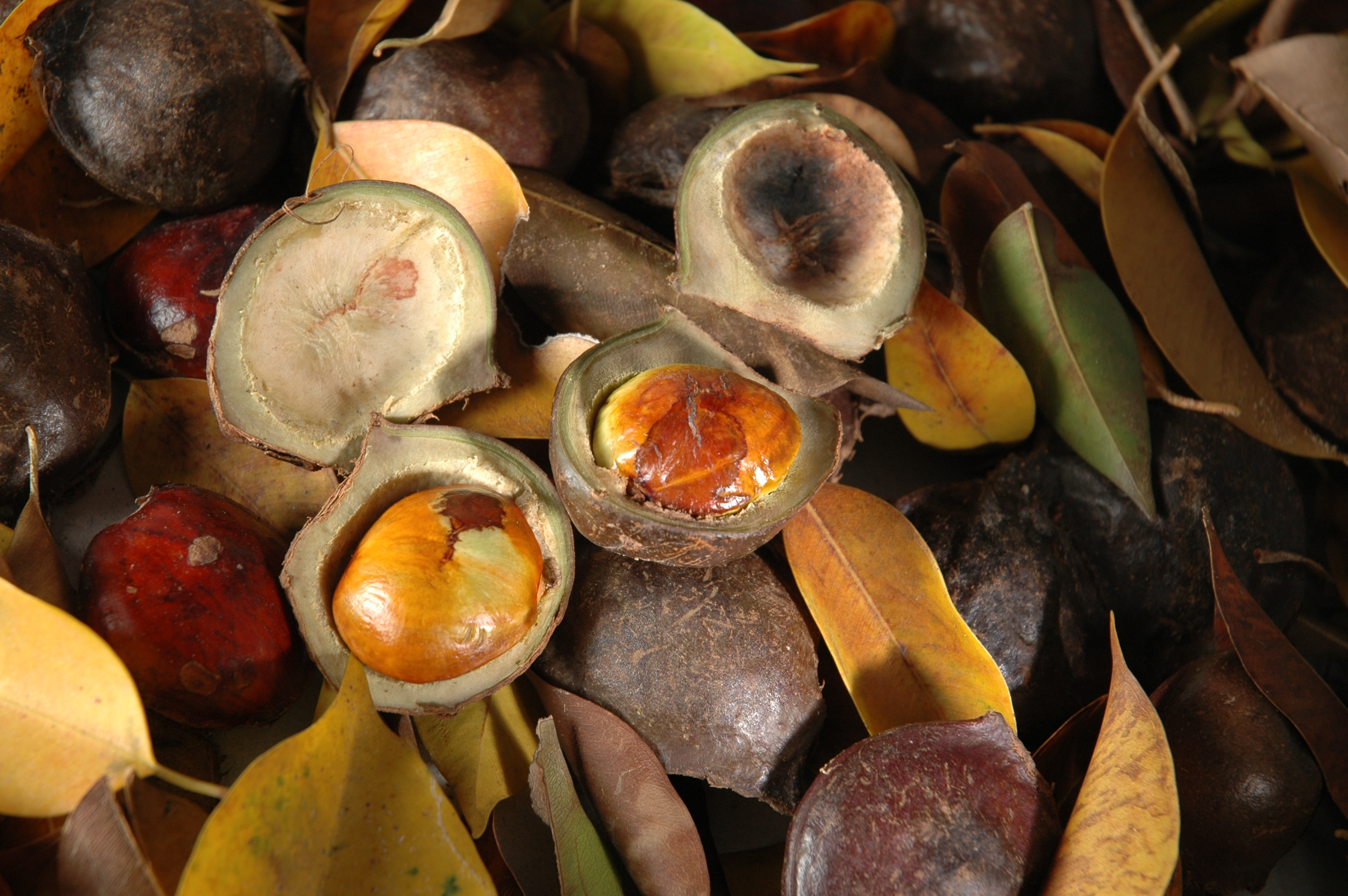
- Archidendron jiringa fruits and seeds

Conservation status
- Least Concern (IUCN 3.1)

Scientific classification
- Kingdom: Plantae
- Clade: Tracheophytes
- Clade: Angiosperms
- Clade: Eudicots
- Clade: Rosids
- Order: Fabales
- Family: Fabaceae
- Subfamily: Caesalpinioideae
- Clade: Mimosoid clade
- Genus: Archidendron
- Species: A. jiringa

Binomial name
- Archidendron jiringa (Jack) I.C.Nielsen

Synonyms
- Albizia jiringa (Jack) Kurz; Feuilleea jiringa (Jack) Kuntze; Inga jiringa (Jack) Jack; Mimosa jiringa Jack; Pithecellobium jiringa (Jack) Prain; Zygia jiriuga (Jack) Kosterm.; Inga attenuata Graham; Inga kaeringa Voigt; Inga koeringa Kostel.; Inga lobata Graham; Mimosa djiringa Roxb.; Mimosa koeringa Roxb.; Pithecellobium lateriflorum Blume ex Miq.; Pithecellobium lobatum Benth.

= Archidendron jiringa =

Species of plant

Archidendron jiringa, commonly known as djenkol, jengkol or jering, is a species of flowering plant in the family Fabaceae. It is native to Southeast Asia, where the seeds are also a popular dish. They are mainly consumed in Indonesia, Thailand, Myanmar, and Vietnam, prepared by frying, boiling, or roasting, and eaten raw. The beans are mildly toxic due to the presence of djenkolic acid, an amino acid that causes djenkolism (djenkol bean poisoning). The beans and leaves of the djenkol tree are traditionally used for medicinal purposes, such as purifying the blood. To date, djenkol is traded on local markets only.

== Vernacular names ==
Common English names are blackbead, dog fruit, jengkol tree, luk nieng tree and ngapi nut. As this plant grows in different countries in Southeast Asia, it has a variety of vernacular names. The common names in Indonesia is jengkol, jinkol, jarung (Sumatra) or jering (Java). It is called krakos in Cambodia, jering in Malaysia, and Thailand. Other vernacular names include luk nieng, cha niang, khang daeng and pha niang. In Myanmar it is called da-nyin-thee or da-nyin-pen.

== Description ==
Archidendron jiringa is a leguminous tree with a size of 18–25 m, has a spreading crown and bipinnate leaves (up to 25 cm) and greyish smooth bark. The young leaves have a wine-red colour and are edible. The flowering time of the tree is between September and January. The white calyx cup-shaped flowers are bisexual and have various yellowish-white stamens.

The fruit (legume) of the tree is a woody, glabrous, deep purple pod. Each Pod contains around three to nine round-shaped seeds. The pods are formed falcate or twisted in a wide spiral. The seed coat of a young seed shows a yellow-green colour and turns dark brown during ripening. Then the ripe fruit dehisces along the ventral suture.

== Habitat and ecology ==
The tree is indigenous to primary and secondary forests in humid, mountainous, and undulating areas as well as on river banks from sea level up to 1600 m elevation in Southeast Asian countries such as Bangladesh, Indonesia (Sumatra, Sulawesi, Kalimantan), Malaysia, Myanmar, and Southern Thailand. Djenkol trees grow best in pervious sandy or lateritic soils and they need a high rainfall guarantee.

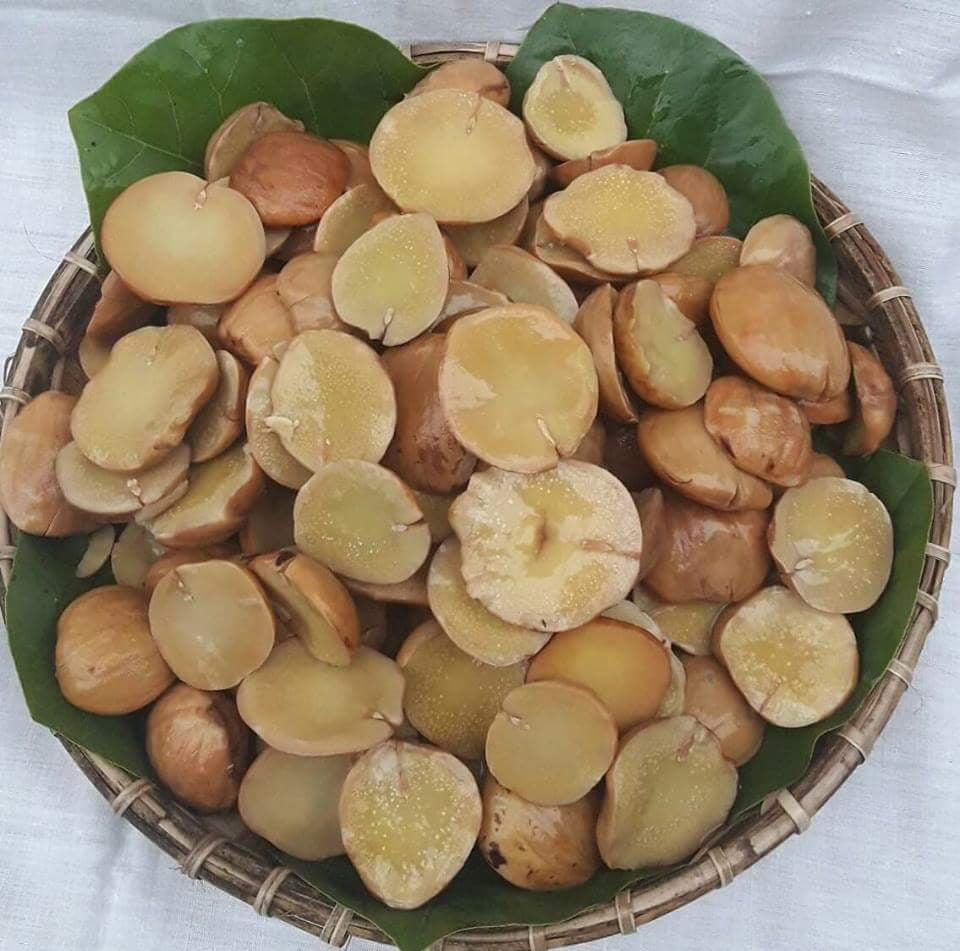
Djenkol Bean

== Toxicity ==
The Djenkol fruit contains djenkolic acid. Eating the djenkol fruit is linked to cases of hematuria. In a study of school children aged 7-11 in Hat-Yai, Thailand who had hematuria, the children were almost four times as likely to have a history of eating djenkol beans. In the cases of eating djenkol, increasing consumption, time since last consumption, or type of preparation (even after adjustment for sex and age) did not change the risk of having hematuria. In that same study, the conclusion was derived that eating djenkol beans may be defined as one of the probable causes of hematuria.

In another report from Indonesia, djenkol consumption can cause hypersaturation of djenkolic acid crystals within the urinary system. That leads to obstructive nephropathy with sludge, stones, or possible spasms. In this report, 96 cases of djenkolism were identified. Recovery for the majority of patients included using hydration, bicarbonate therapy, and pain medication for treatment. Three patients required surgery. Another patient had obstructing djenkolic acid stones and required urethral stinting. Out of the 96 reported cases, four patients died with the final diagnosis as acute kidney failure.

In a different study of Australian acacia seeds (Acacia colei, Acacia elecantha, Acacia tumida, and Acacia saligna), the study focused on processing methods to reduce djenkolic acid in the seeds. The study tested the levels of djenkolic acid in the seeds of each species and reported the levels to be similar to the djenkol bean. The conclusion of that study surmised that djenkolic acid levels can be reduced by over 90% through dry roasting at 180°C. The new lower levels of djenkolic acid were safe for human consumption. However, in the Hat-Yai, Thailand study, different types of preparation did not change the risk of having hematuria.

== Uses ==
=== Culinary ===
==== Nutritional value ====
Djenkol Bean
Nutritional value per 100 g (3.5 oz)
- Carbohydrates: 25.67 g
- Dietary fiber: 1.76 g
- Fat: 1.45 g
- Protein: 14.19 g
- ^{†}Percentages estimated using US recommendations for adults.

The beans of the djenkol tree have a crude carbohydrate content of about 26% which is relatively low compared to other common legumes, such as cowpea, kidney bean, and pea which all contain about 60 - 70%. The crude protein content instead is about 14.2%. This is higher than that of common cereals, such as wheat (13%), rye (11%), or rice (7%). The presence of adequate protein and low-fat contents might be perceived as desirable by consumers. When processed to flour, high moisture content (about 59%) suggests that this seed needs to be further processed to improve its shelf life and overall quality.

==== Ways of preparation ====
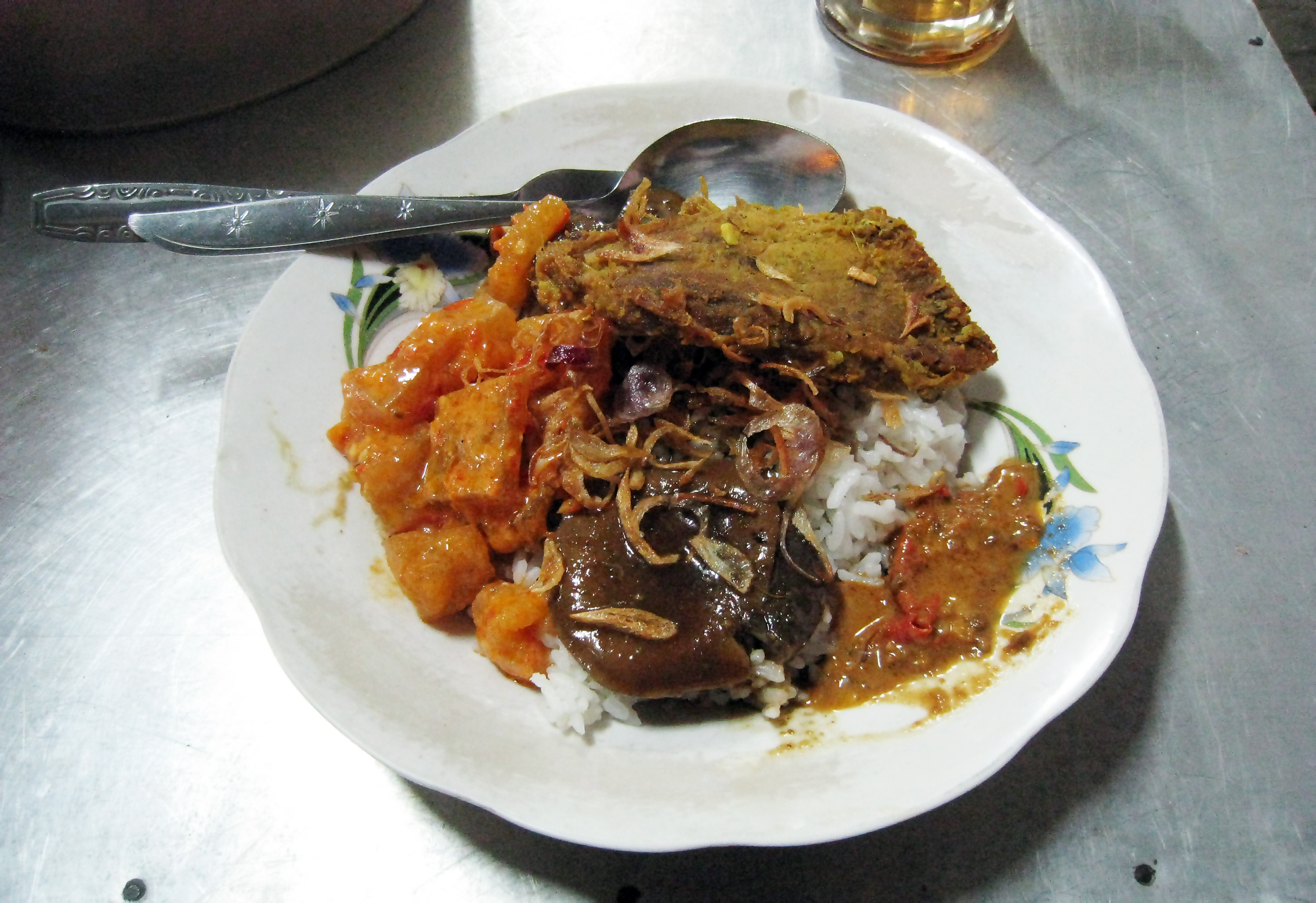
Nasi uduk with jengkol, semur, empal fried beef and krecek (cow skin in spicy coconut milk)

Djenkol beans are 3.0 to 3.5 cm in diameter and 1.5 to 2.0 cm thick and have a reddish-brown color. These beans are prepared by frying, boiling, or roasting and are also eaten raw. They are mainly consumed in Thailand, Malaysia, Myanmar, and Indonesia. The seeds of djenkol are mainly used to add flavour to food, although the crushed seeds give off a mild sulfurous odor which is perceived as rather offensive by some people. Young seeds are often eaten raw as so-called ulam. Mature seeds are prepared in different ways:

- boiled thoroughly until the bad smell has disappeared, then consumed with salt and grated coconut.
- steeped in salted water for some hours, then fried in oil. This also removes most of the offensive smell.
- The seeds can be buried for about 14 days until they germinate. Then they are dug up and eaten after the sprout has been removed. This way of preparation is said to minimize the danger of intoxication by jengkolic acid.

=== Medical ===
==== Folk medicine ====
Different parts of the djenkol tree are applied in traditional medicine in Southeast Asia. The raw seeds are thought to purify the blood or cure dysentery. Compresses with young leaves are used for skin problems, and burnt old leaves are believed to relieve itchy feelings. The powder of burnt young leaves is applied to cuts and wounds.

=== Other uses ===
Archidendron jiringa can also be used for dyeing. The pods of the seeds dye silk purple and the bark of the tree dyes black. The shell is also being used for hair washing, timber as firewood, and for building (e.g. coffins). Due to the content of djenkolic acids in the seeds, the raw seed is also being applied to the production of organic pesticides in combination with other plants to kill and prevent the growth of pests.

== Cultivation ==
=== Forms of cultivation ===
Djenkol trees have often been spared when primary or secondary rainforests have been cut down. Otherwise planting distances are 10–15 m. The plant favours well-drained sandy, lateritic or sandy clay soil. is propagated by Seed. Methods for clonal distribution have not yet been found. In nature, squirrels (Callosciurus notatus) eat the seeds and facilitate their distribution.

=== Harvest and post-harvest treatment ===
A tree produces between 1000 and 4000 seeds per year. The main harvesting time in Java is around July to August and the aftercrop in December to February. Usually, djenkol is sold in the markets by several seeds. For transport, seeds, in particular young ones, should not be removed from the pods to avoid desiccation. One way to store the seeds is by processing them into chips (emping). Another possibility however could be its procession to flour. To date, due to the high moisture content, this is hardly done.

=== Pests and diseases ===
Archidendron jiringa has several pests in common with other leguminous trees and shrubs such as the pod-borers Mussidia pectinicornella and Cryptophlebia ombrodelta or the caterpillars of the leaf-feeder Eurema blanda, one of the most common butterflies in Java.
