= Djenkolic acid =

Names
- IUPAC name (2R)-2-Amino-3-[[(2R)-2-amino-3-hydroxy-3-oxopropyl] sulfanylmethylsulfanyl]propanoic acid
- Other names Djenkolate; Jengkolic acid; S,S'-Methylenebiscysteine

Identifiers
CAS Number	498-59-9
3D model (JSmol)	Interactive image
ChEBI	CHEBI:6211
ChemSpider	61442
ECHA InfoCard	100.007.150
EC Number	207-863-4
KEGG	C08275
PubChem CID	68134
UNII	3QHC9R0YFZ
CompTox Dashboard (EPA)	DTXSID80198075
- InChI: InChI=1S/C7H14N2O4S2/c8-4(6(10)11)1-14-3-15-2-5(9)7(12)13/h4-5H,1-3,8-9H2,(H,10,11)(H,12,13)/t4-,5-/m0/s1 Key: JMQMNWIBUCGUDO-WHFBIAKZSA-N; InChI=1/C7H14N2O4S2/c8-4(6(10)11)1-14-3-15-2-5(9)7(12)13/h4-5H,1-3,8-9H2,(H,10,11)(H,12,13)/t4-,5-/m0/s1 Key: JMQMNWIBUCGUDO-WHFBIAKZBK
- SMILES: O=C(O)[C@@H](N)CSCSC[C@H](N)C(=O)O

Properties
Chemical formula	C_{7}H_{14}N_{2}O_{4}S_{2}
Molar mass	254.33 g/mol
Solubility in water	1.02 g L^{−1} (at 30±0.5°C)
- Except where otherwise noted, data are given for materials in their standard state (at 25 °C [77 °F], 100 kPa). verify (what is ?) Infobox references

Djenkolic acid (or sometimes jengkolic acid) is an naturally occurring organic compound with the formula CH_{2}(SCH_{2}CH(NH_{2})CO_{2}H)_{2}. It is sulfur-containing nonproteinogenic amino acid found in the djenkol beans of the Southeast Asian plant Archidendron jiringa. Its chemical structure is similar to cystine but contains a methylene (single carbon) unit between the two sulfur atoms. Dry djenkol beans contain about 20 grams of djenkolic acid per kilogram. It has also been reported in smaller amounts in the seeds of other leguminous plants such as Leucaena esculenta (2.2 g/kg) and Pithecolobium ondulatum (2.8 g/kg).

== Toxicity ==
The toxicity of djenkolic acid in humans arises from its poor solubility under acidic conditions after consumption of the djenkol bean. The amino acid precipitates into crystals which cause mechanical irritation of the renal tubules and urinary tract, resulting in symptoms such as abdominal discomfort, loin pains, severe colic, nausea, vomiting, dysuria, gross hematuria, and oliguria, occurring 2 to 6 hours after the beans were ingested. Urine analysis of patients reveals erythrocytes, epithelial cells, protein, and the needle-like crystals of djenkolic acid. Urolithiasis can also happen, with djenkolic acid as the nucleus. In young children, it has also been reported to produce painful swelling of the genitalia.

Treatment for this toxicity requires hydration to increase urine flow and alkalinization of urine by sodium bicarbonate. Furthermore, this poisoning can be prevented when consuming djenkol beans by boiling them beforehand, since djenkolic acid is removed from the beans.

== Discovery and synthesis ==
Djenkolic acid was first isolated by Van Veen and Hyman in 1933 from the urine of the natives of Java who had eaten the djenkol bean and were suffering from poisoning. They then isolated the djenkolic acid crystals by treating the djenkol beans with barium hydroxide at 30°C for a prolonged period.

Du Vigneaud and Patterson managed to synthesize djenkolic acid by condensation of methylene chloride with 2 moles of L-cysteine in liquid ammonia. Later on, Armstrong and du Vigneaud prepared djenkolic acid by the direct combination of 1 mole of formaldehyde with 2 moles of L-cysteine in a strongly acidic solution.
