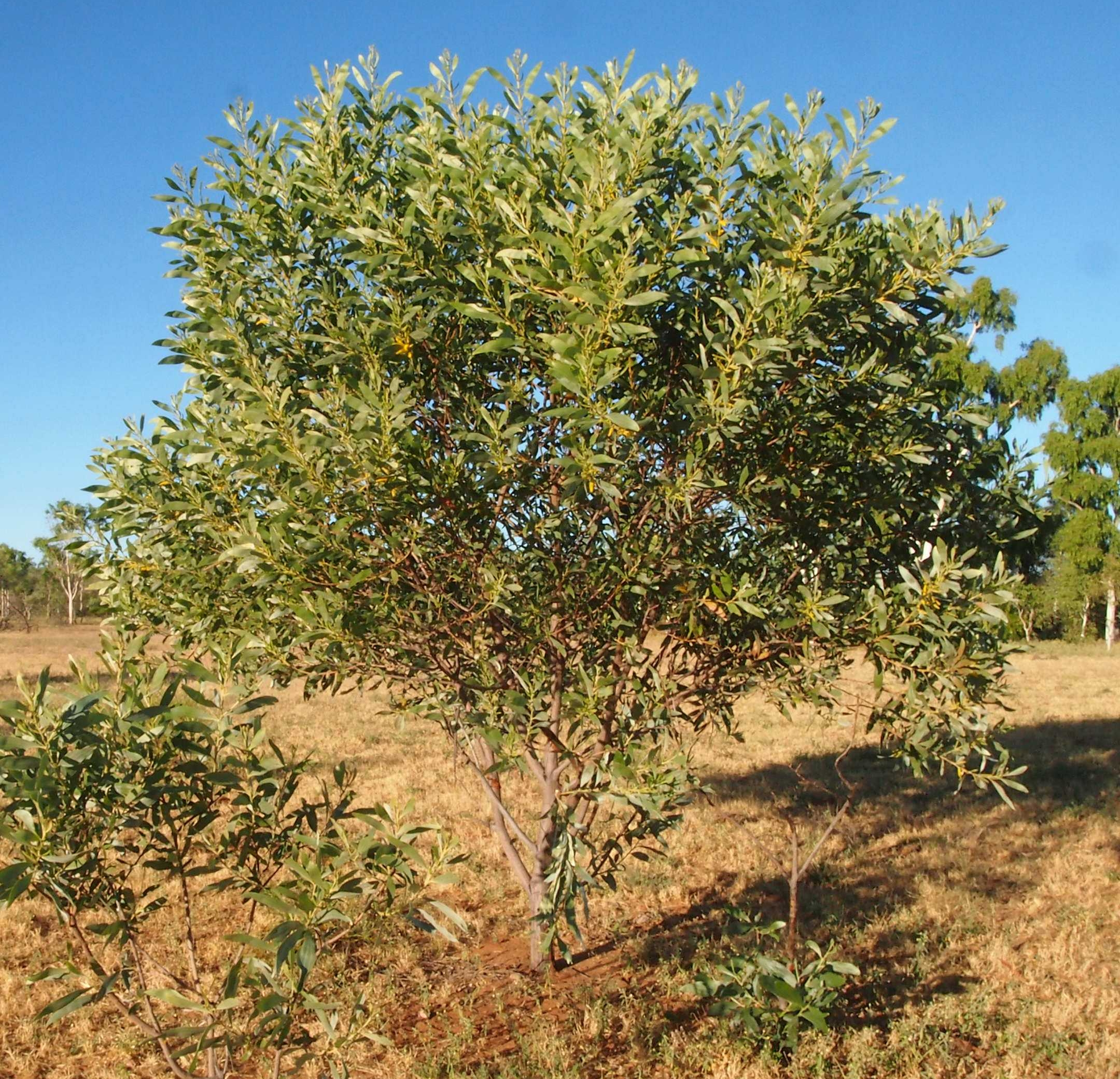

Scientific classification
- Kingdom: Plantae
- Clade: Tracheophytes
- Clade: Angiosperms
- Clade: Eudicots
- Clade: Rosids
- Order: Fabales
- Family: Fabaceae
- Subfamily: Caesalpinioideae
- Clade: Mimosoid clade
- Genus: Acacia
- Species: A. colei

Binomial name
- Acacia colei Maslin & L.A.J. Thomson
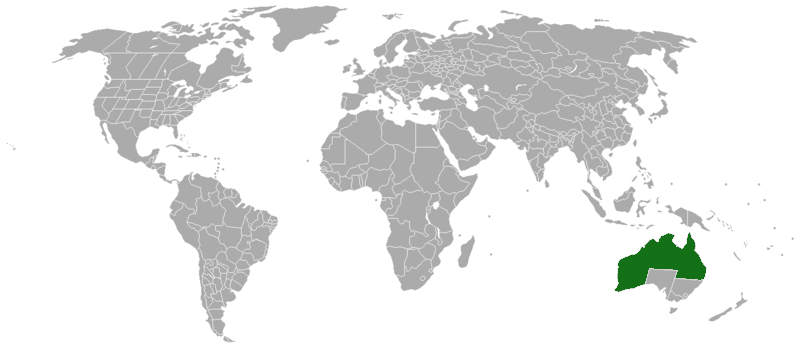
- Range of Acacia colei

Synonyms
- Racosperma colei (Maslin & L.A.J.Thomson) Pedley; Acacia holosericea auct. non A.Cunn. ex G. Don Pedley, L. (1964); Acacia holosericea auct. non A.Cunn. ex G.Don: Maslin, B.R. in Jessop, J.P. (ed.) (1981)

= Acacia colei =

Cole's wattle

Species of legume

Acacia colei, commonly known as Cole's wattle, kalkardi, candelabra wattle or soap wattle, is a species of flowering plant in the family Fabaceae. It forms a spreading shrub or tree with narrowly elliptic, more or less straight phyllodes, spikes of golden yellow flowers, and openly and strongly curved, thinly leathery to crust-like, more or less glabrous pods.

The species is endemic to northern Australia and is adapted to a dry environment. Its seeds are edible.

== Description ==
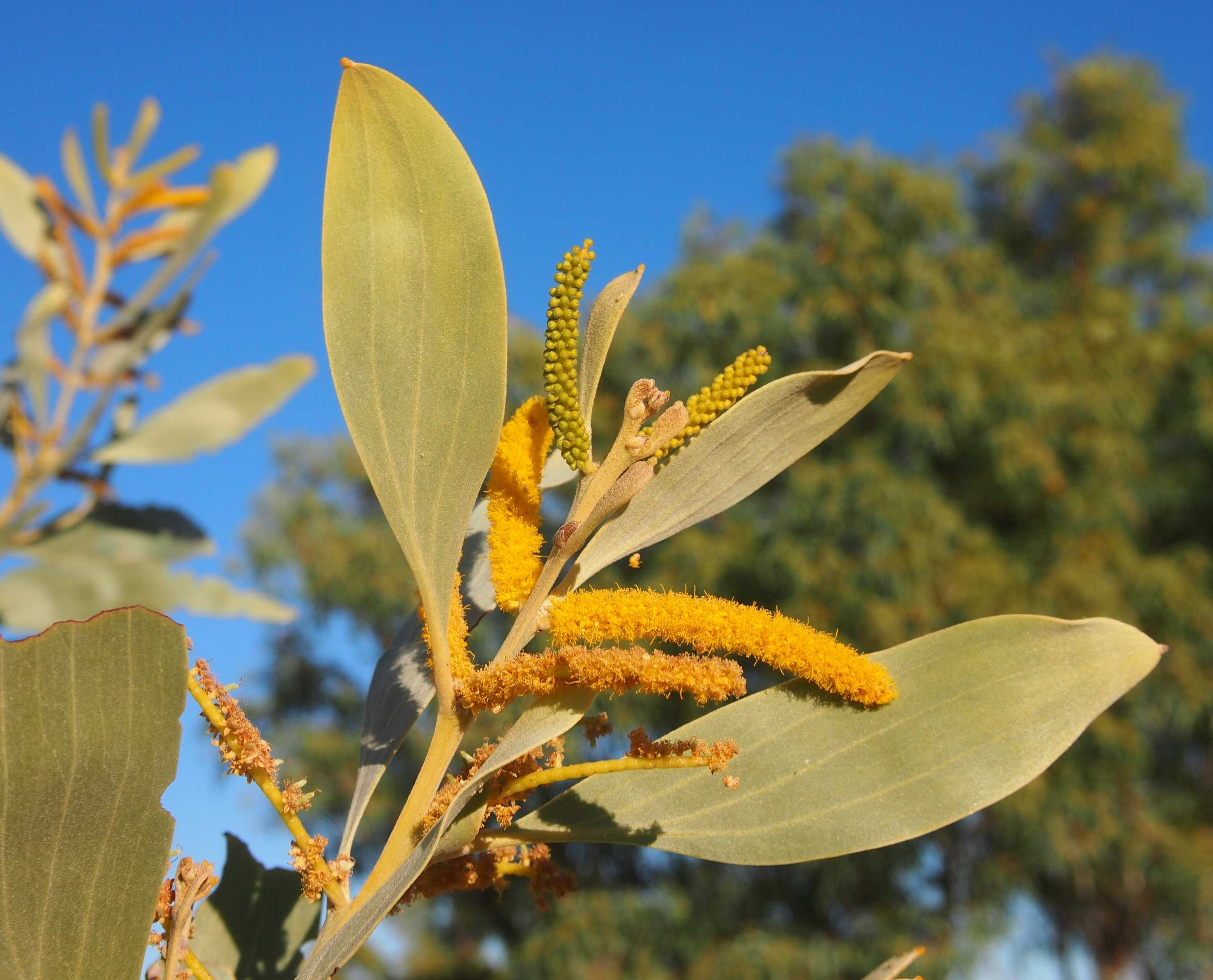
Flowers and foliage

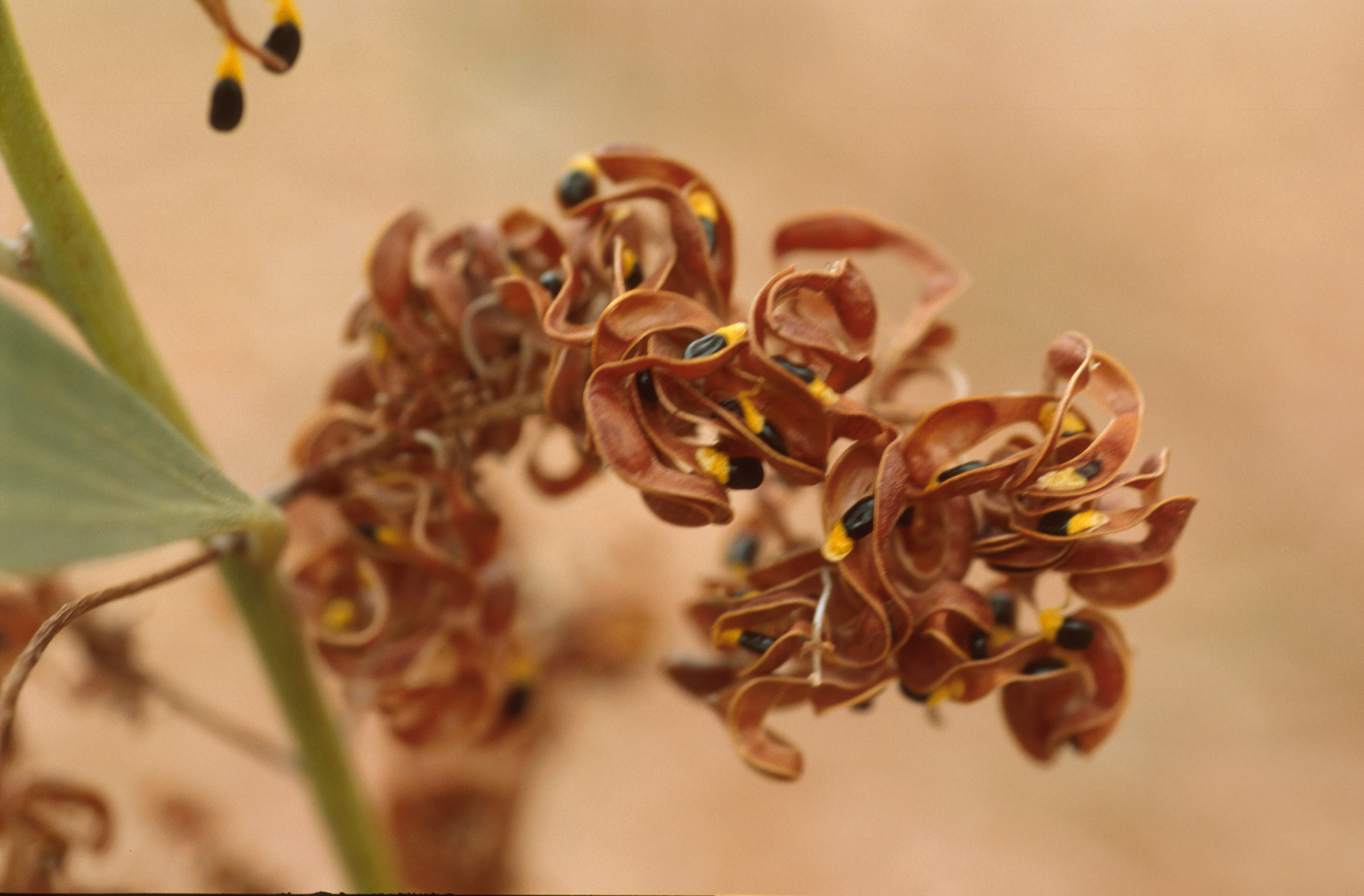
Var. ileocarpa seed pods

Acacia colei is a spreading shrub that typically grows to a height of 2–4 metres (6 1/2–13 ft), sometimes a tree to 9 m (30 ft). Its new shoots are covered with silky, pale yellow-brown hairs that soon age to silvery. The branchlets are covered with silvery, silky hairs. The phyllodes are ascending, narrowly elliptic and more or less straight, 7–23 millimetres (1/4–1 in) long, 10–45 mm (1/2–1 3/4 in) wide, and often shallowly turned down at tip.

The flowers are borne in two spikes in axils on peduncles 3–5 mm (1/8–1/4 in) long, each spike 30–70 mm (1 1/8–2 3/4 in) long with golden yellow flowers. Flowering occurs from May to September, and the pods are curved or coiled depending on subspecies, thinly leathery to crust-like, 3.5–4 mm (1/8–1/8 in) wide. The seeds are oblong, glossy, very dark brown to black with a bright yellow aril.

== Taxonomy ==
Acacia colei was first formally described in 1992 by Bruce Maslin and Lex Thomson in the journal Australian Systematic Botany from specimens collected in the Broome townsite in 1991. The specific epithet (colei) honours the CSIRO seed collector, Mr E.G. (Jerry) Cole, "who assisted in extensive botanical and seed collections of A. colei in 1984".

In 1997, Maurice W. McDonald and Bruce Maslin described var. ileocarpa, and its name and that of the autonym are accepted by the Australian Plant Census:

- Acacia colei Maslin & L.A.J.Thomson var. colei (the autonym) has phyllodes 20–45 mm (0.79–1.77 in) wide, curved pods, sometimes into an open circle, and seeds 3.5–4.0 mm (0.14–0.16 in) long.
- Acacia colei var. ileocarpa M.W.McDonald & Maslin has phyllodes 10–25 mm (0.39–0.98 in) wide, tightly and irregularly coiled or twisted pods, and seeds 3.0–3.5 mm (0.12–0.14 in) long.

== Distribution and habitat ==
Cole's wattle is found throughout northern Australia between latitudes of 16°S and 22°S from the Pilbara and Kimberley regions of Western Australia in the west extending east through the Tanami Desert and Great Sandy Deserts in the Northern Territory and into the Simpson Desert and Gulf Country of western Queensland. It is well adapted to an arid environment and is found in a variety of habitats including stony hills and ridges, sandplains, floodplains and along drainage lines growing in stony, sandy, clay-loam soils.

Variety ileocarpa has a scattered distribution in the southern Kimberley region and adjacent parts of western Northern Territory, and a restricted distribution in the Pilbara region.

== Uses ==
Its uses include environmental management, forage, and wood. The seeds have a good taste and can be eaten raw, cooked, or ground into flour. The results of tests in Nigeria for the feasibility of raising the tree as a drought-resistant food crop came out very positively.

== Chemistry ==
There are some recent reports that up to 1.8% dimethyltryptamine (DMT) is present in the bark of Acacia colei.

== In culture ==
The Walmadjari people in the Kimberley call this wattle, parta, the Djaru people call it barrawi or barrabi.

== See also ==
- List of Acacia species
