= Archidendron microcarpum =

Scientific classification
- Kingdom: Plantae
- Clade: Tracheophytes
- Clade: Angiosperms
- Clade: Eudicots
- Clade: Rosids
- Order: Fabales
- Family: Fabaceae
- Subfamily: Caesalpinioideae
- Clade: Mimosoid clade
- Genus: Archidendron
- Species: A. microcarpum

Binomial name
- Archidendron microcarpum (Benth.) I.C.Nielsen

Synonyms
- Abarema microcarpa (Benth.) Kosterm.; Feuilleea microcarpa (Benth.) Kuntze; Pithecellobium microcarpum Benth.

Species of legume

Archidendron microcarpum, kabau in Indonesia, is a flowering plant in the family Fabaceae. It is native to Sumatra, Borneo and Peninsular Malaysia. It is a shade tree for shade-grown coffee in Indonesia.
