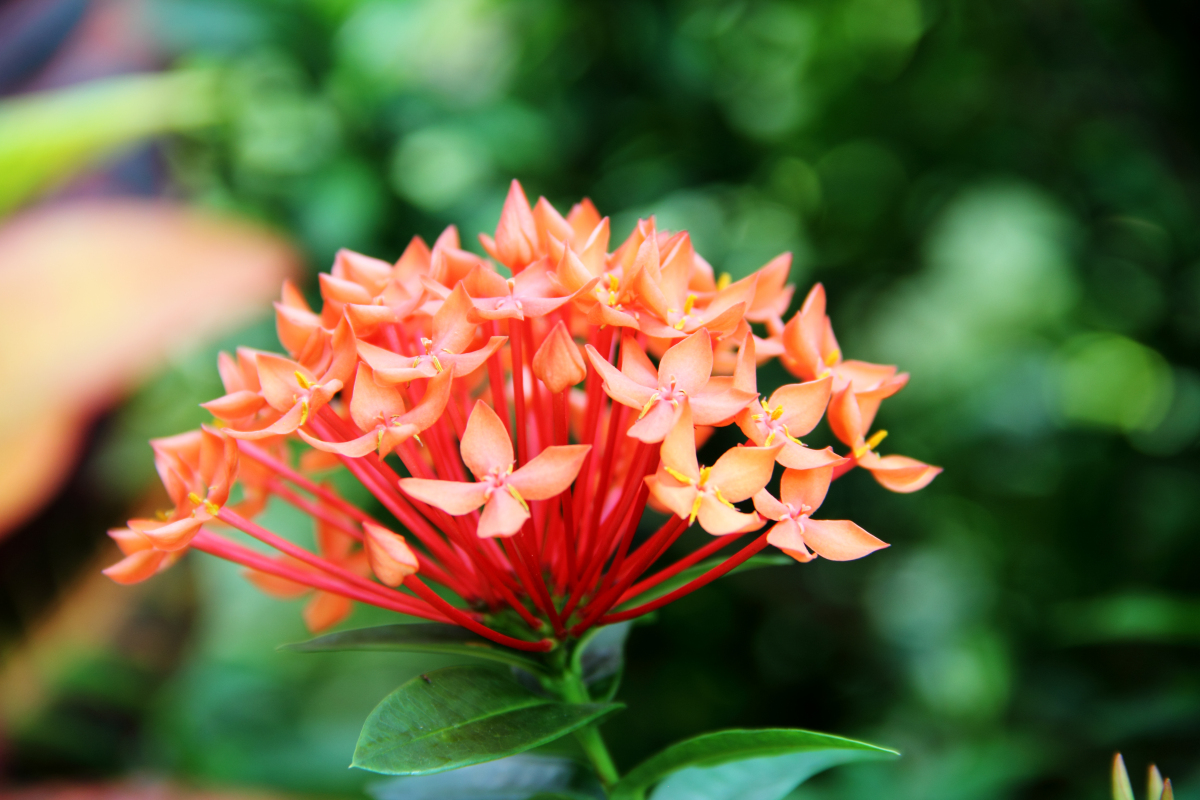

Conservation status
- Least Concern (IUCN 3.1)

Scientific classification
- Kingdom: Plantae
- Clade: Tracheophytes
- Clade: Angiosperms
- Clade: Eudicots
- Clade: Asterids
- Order: Gentianales
- Family: Rubiaceae
- Genus: Ixora
- Species: I. chinensis

Binomial name
- Ixora chinensis Lam.

Synonyms
- See text

= Ixora chinensis =

Species of plant

Ixora chinensis, commonly known as Chinese ixora, is a species of plant of the genus Ixora. It is a shrub native to southeastern China, Indochina, and the Philippines.

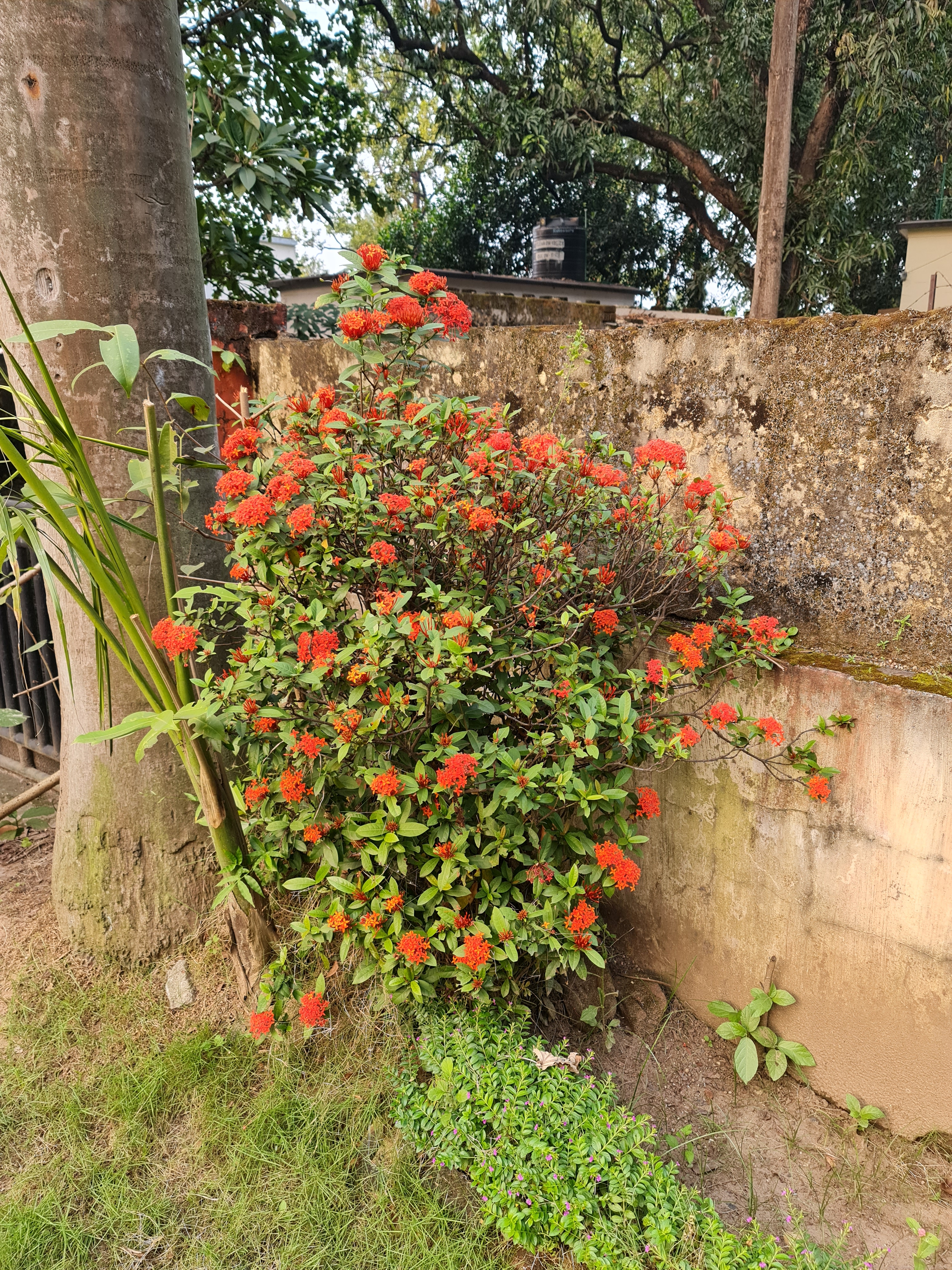
Ixora chinensis in bloom

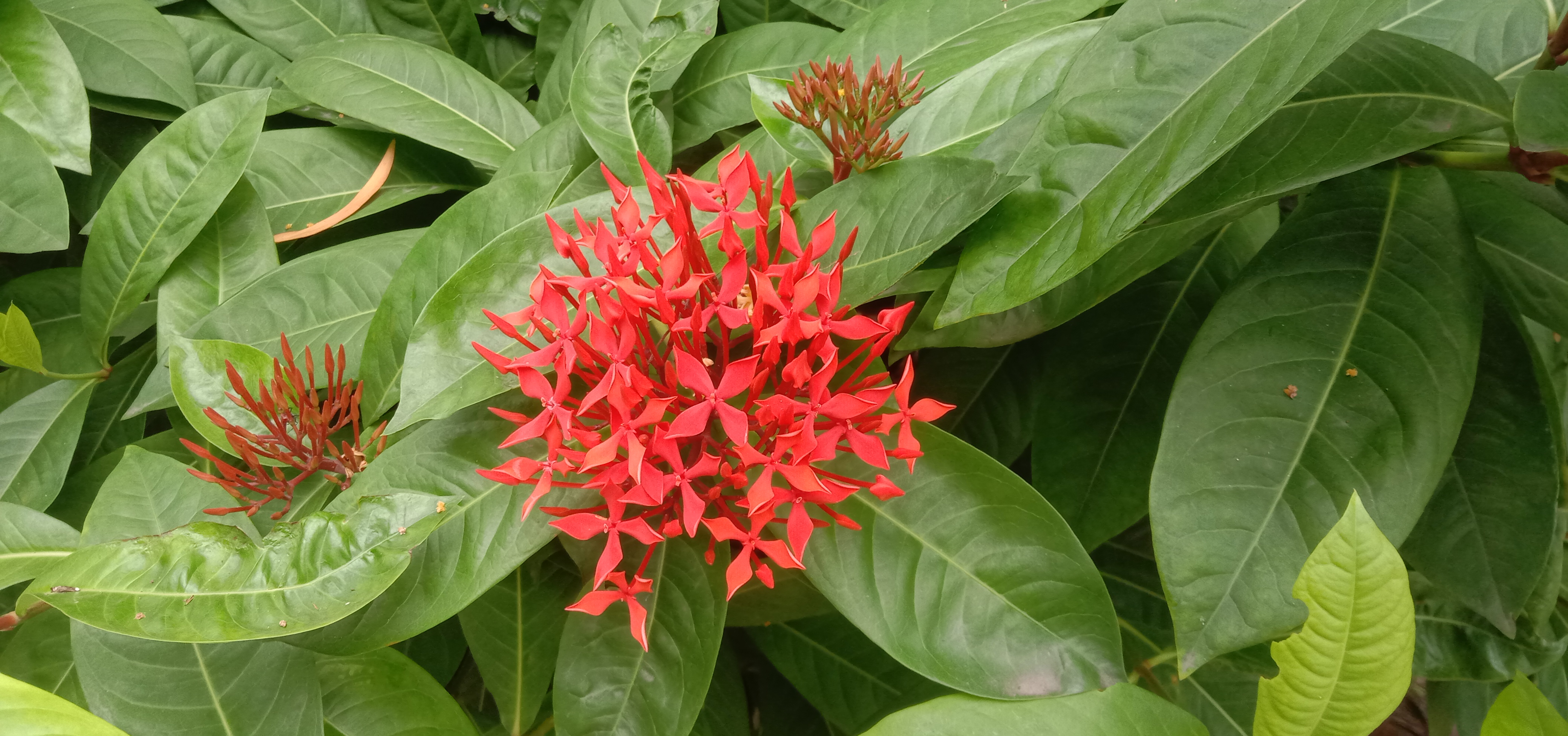
Flowers of Chinese ixora at the campus of Ramakrishna Mission Shikshanamandira in Belur, Howrah.

== Distribution ==
This species is native to Cambodia, southeastern China, Laos, Myanmar, the Philippines, Thailand and Vietnam. It has been introduced into Bangladesh, the Caroline Islands, Colombia, Peninsular Malaysia, and the Marianas.

== Growth form and ecology ==
Ixora chinensis is a shrub and grows primarily in the wet tropical biome.

== Synonyms ==
The Catalogue of Life recognises the following synonyms:

- Bemsetia paniculata Raf.
- Gaertnera hongkongensis Seem.
- Ixora blanda Ker Gawl.
- Ixora coccinea Curtis, nom. illeg.
- Ixora colei W.Bull
- Ixora crocata Lindl.
- Ixora dixiana W.Bull
- Ixora dubia Schult. & Schult.f.
- Ixora flammea Salisb.
- Ixora incarnata Roxb. ex Sm.
- Ixora kroneana (Miq.) Bremek.
- Ixora pallida Reinw. ex Miq.
- Ixora rosea Sims, nom. illeg.
- Ixora speciosa Willd.
- Ixora stricta Roxb.
- Ixora stricta var. mekongensis Pierre ex Pit.
- Pavetta arborea Blanco
- Pavetta chinensis (Lam.) Roem. & Schult.
- Pavetta kroneana Miq.
- Pavetta stricta (Roxb.) Blume
- Sykesia hongkongensis (Seem.) Kuntze
- Tsiangia hongkongensis (Seem.) But, H.H.Hsue & P.T.Li
