= Ixora saulierei =

Conservation status
- Endangered (IUCN 2.3)

Scientific classification
- Kingdom: Plantae
- Clade: Tracheophytes
- Clade: Angiosperms
- Clade: Eudicots
- Clade: Asterids
- Order: Gentianales
- Family: Rubiaceae
- Genus: Ixora
- Species: I. saulierei

Binomial name
- Ixora saulierei Gamble

Species of plant

Ixora saulierei is a species of flowering plant in the family Rubiaceae. It is endemic to the Palani Hills of Tamil Nadu in southern India, where it grows in the understory of moist montane forest.
