= Ixora lawsonii =

Conservation status
- Endangered (IUCN 2.3)

Scientific classification
- Kingdom: Plantae
- Clade: Tracheophytes
- Clade: Angiosperms
- Clade: Eudicots
- Clade: Asterids
- Order: Gentianales
- Family: Rubiaceae
- Genus: Ixora
- Species: I. lawsonii

Binomial name
- Ixora lawsonii Gamble

Synonyms
- Ixora manantoddii T.Husain & S.R.Paul

Species of plant

Ixora lawsonii is a species of flowering plant in the family Rubiaceae. It is a small tree native to the Western Ghats of Karnataka and Kerala in southwestern India, where it grows in submontane evergreen moist forest.
