= Ixora calycina =

Conservation status
- Endangered (IUCN 2.3)

Scientific classification
- Kingdom: Plantae
- Clade: Tracheophytes
- Clade: Angiosperms
- Clade: Eudicots
- Clade: Asterids
- Order: Gentianales
- Family: Rubiaceae
- Genus: Ixora
- Species: I. calycina

Binomial name
- Ixora calycina Thwaites

Species of plant

Ixora calycina is a species of flowering plant in the family Rubiaceae. It is endemic to Sri Lanka.
