= Ixora setchellii =

Conservation status
- Least Concern (IUCN 2.3)

Scientific classification
- Kingdom: Plantae
- Clade: Tracheophytes
- Clade: Angiosperms
- Clade: Eudicots
- Clade: Asterids
- Order: Gentianales
- Family: Rubiaceae
- Genus: Ixora
- Species: I. setchellii

Binomial name
- Ixora setchellii Fosberg

Species of plant

Ixora setchellii is a species of flowering plant in the family Rubiaceae. It is endemic to the Society Islands of French Polynesia.
