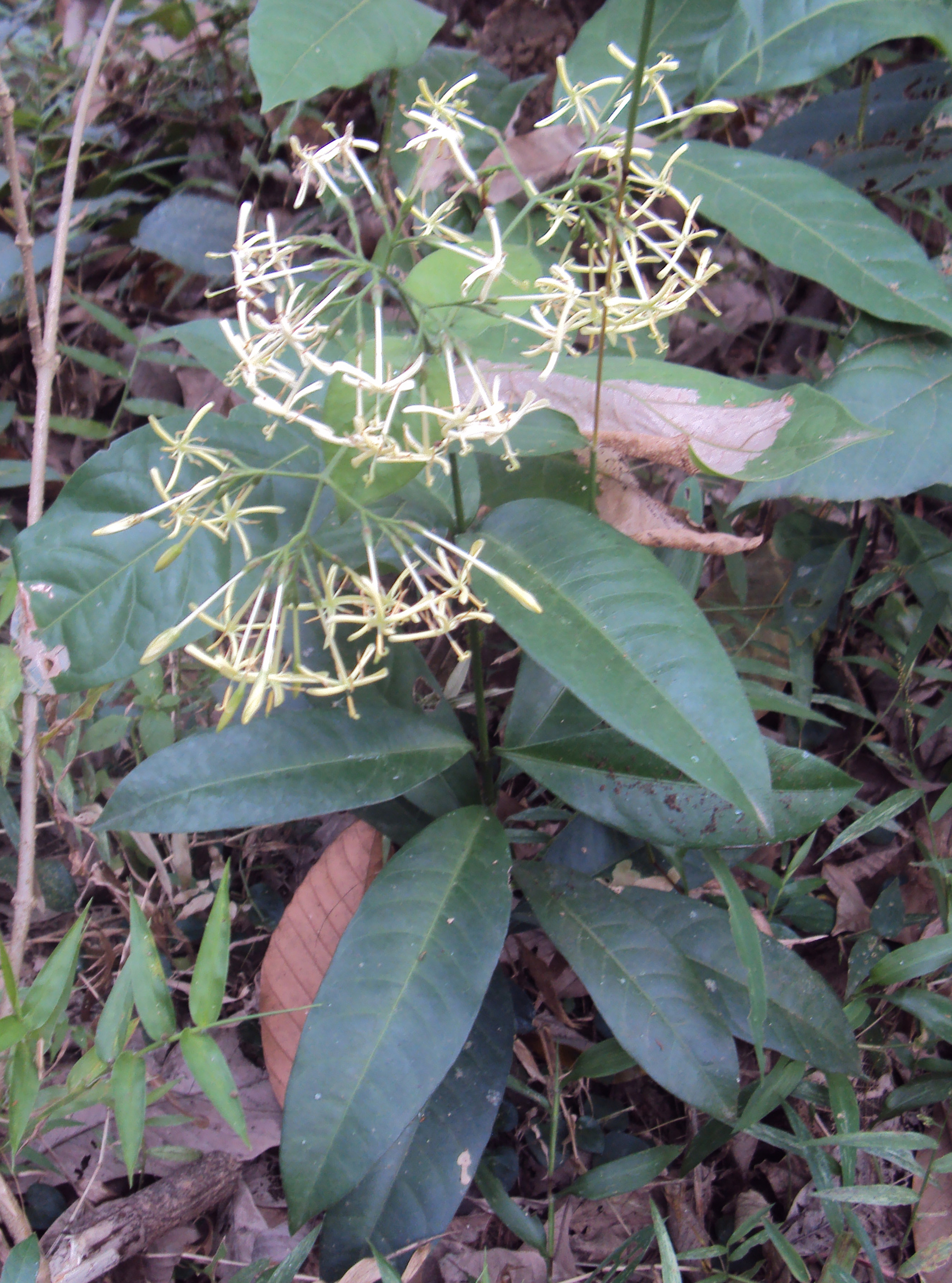
- Ixora malabarica - Small plant with flowers at Peravoor

Conservation status
- Vulnerable (IUCN 2.3)

Scientific classification
- Kingdom: Plantae
- Clade: Tracheophytes
- Clade: Angiosperms
- Clade: Eudicots
- Clade: Asterids
- Order: Gentianales
- Family: Rubiaceae
- Genus: Ixora
- Species: I. malabarica

Binomial name
- Ixora malabarica (Dennst.) Mabb.

= Ixora malabarica =

Species of plant

Ixora malabarica is a species of flowering plant in the family Rubiaceae. It is native to Karnataka and Kerala in India.
