= Ixora raiateensis =

Conservation status
- Critically Endangered (IUCN 3.1)

Scientific classification
- Kingdom: Plantae
- Clade: Tracheophytes
- Clade: Angiosperms
- Clade: Eudicots
- Clade: Asterids
- Order: Gentianales
- Family: Rubiaceae
- Genus: Ixora
- Species: I. raiateensis

Binomial name
- Ixora raiateensis J.W.Moore

Species of plant

Ixora raiateensis is a species of flowering plant in the family Rubiaceae. It is a shrub endemic to Raiatea in the Society Islands of French Polynesia, hence its name.
