= Ixora temehaniensis =

Conservation status
- Critically Endangered (IUCN 3.1)

Scientific classification
- Kingdom: Plantae
- Clade: Embryophytes
- Clade: Tracheophytes
- Clade: Angiosperms
- Clade: Eudicots
- Clade: Asterids
- Order: Gentianales
- Family: Rubiaceae
- Genus: Ixora
- Species: I. temehaniensis

Binomial name
- Ixora temehaniensis J.W.Moore (1933)

Species of plant

Ixora temehaniensis is a species of flowering plant in the family Rubiaceae. It is a shrub or tree endemic to the island Raiatea in the Society Islands of French Polynesia.
