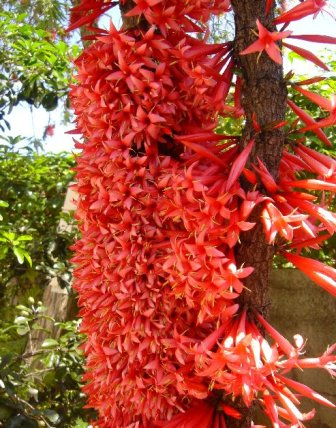

Conservation status
- Vulnerable (IUCN 3.1)

Scientific classification
- Kingdom: Plantae
- Clade: Tracheophytes
- Clade: Angiosperms
- Clade: Eudicots
- Clade: Asterids
- Order: Gentianales
- Family: Rubiaceae
- Genus: Ixora
- Species: I. margaretae

Binomial name
- Ixora margaretae (N.Hallé) Mouly & B.Bremer

Synonyms
- Captaincookia margaretae N.Hallé

= Ixora margaretae =

Species of plant

Ixora margaretae is a species of plant in the family Rubiaceae. It is endemic to New Caledonia. It is threatened by habitat loss.
