= Ixora brevipedunculata =

Conservation status
- Data Deficient (IUCN 2.3)

Scientific classification
- Kingdom: Plantae
- Clade: Tracheophytes
- Clade: Angiosperms
- Clade: Eudicots
- Clade: Asterids
- Order: Gentianales
- Family: Rubiaceae
- Genus: Ixora
- Species: I. brevipedunculata

Binomial name
- Ixora brevipedunculata Fosberg (1937)

Species of plant

Ixora brevipedunculata is a species of flowering plant in the family Rubiaceae. It is a tree endemic to the Tubuai Islands in French Polynesia.
