= Ixora mooreensis =

Conservation status
- Least Concern (IUCN 2.3)

Scientific classification
- Kingdom: Plantae
- Clade: Tracheophytes
- Clade: Angiosperms
- Clade: Eudicots
- Clade: Asterids
- Order: Gentianales
- Family: Rubiaceae
- Genus: Ixora
- Species: I. mooreensis

Binomial name
- Ixora mooreensis (Nadeaud) Fosberg

Species of plant

Ixora mooreensis is a species of flowering plant in the family Rubiaceae. It is endemic to the island of Moorea in the Society Islands of French Polynesia, hence its name.
