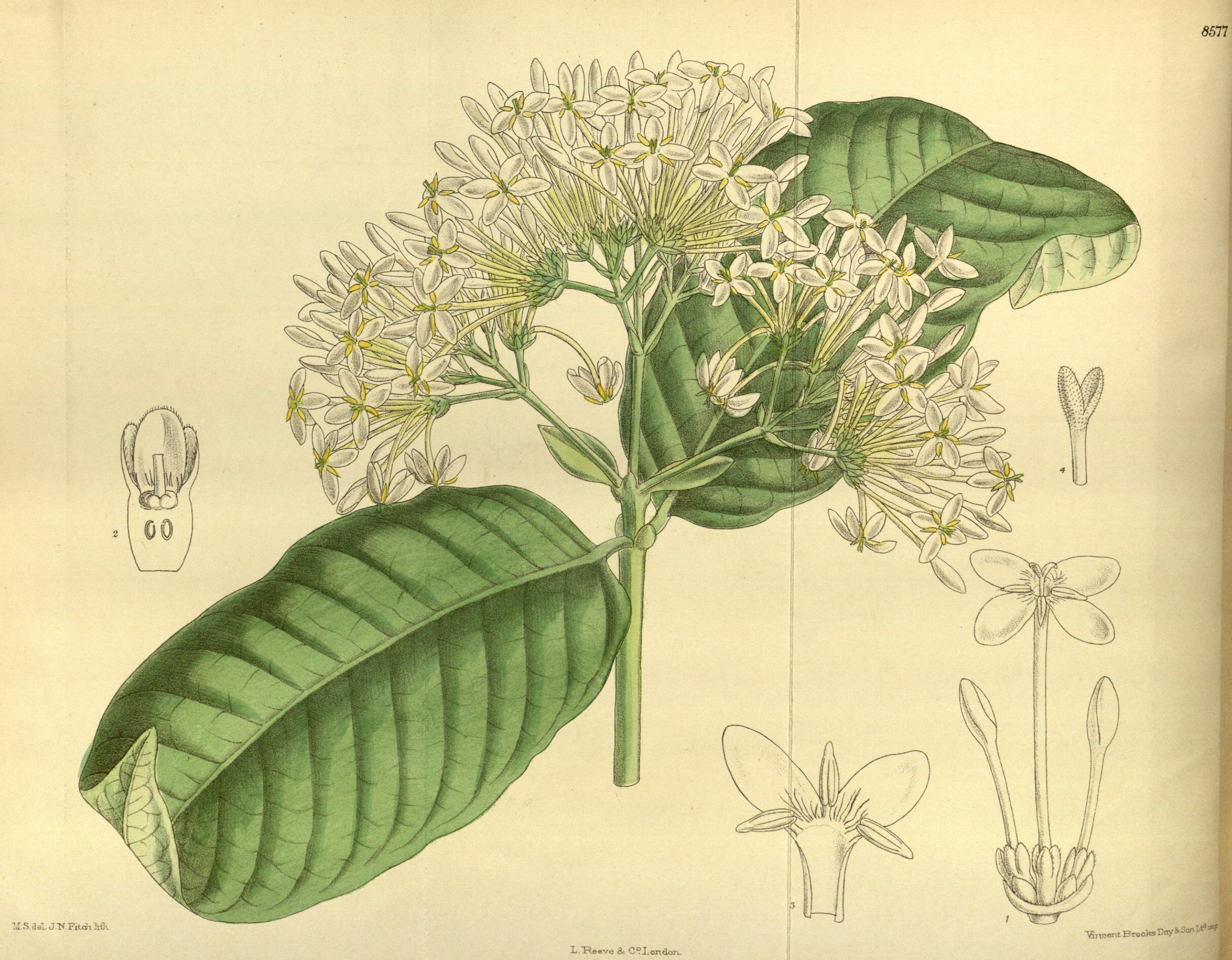

Scientific classification
- Kingdom: Plantae
- Clade: Tracheophytes
- Clade: Angiosperms
- Clade: Eudicots
- Clade: Asterids
- Order: Gentianales
- Family: Rubiaceae
- Genus: Ixora
- Species: I. umbellata

Binomial name
- Ixora umbellata Valeton ex Koord. & Valeton

= Ixora umbellata =

Species of plant

Ixora umbellata is a species of flowering plant in the family Rubiaceae. It is found from southern Indo-China to western Malaysia.
