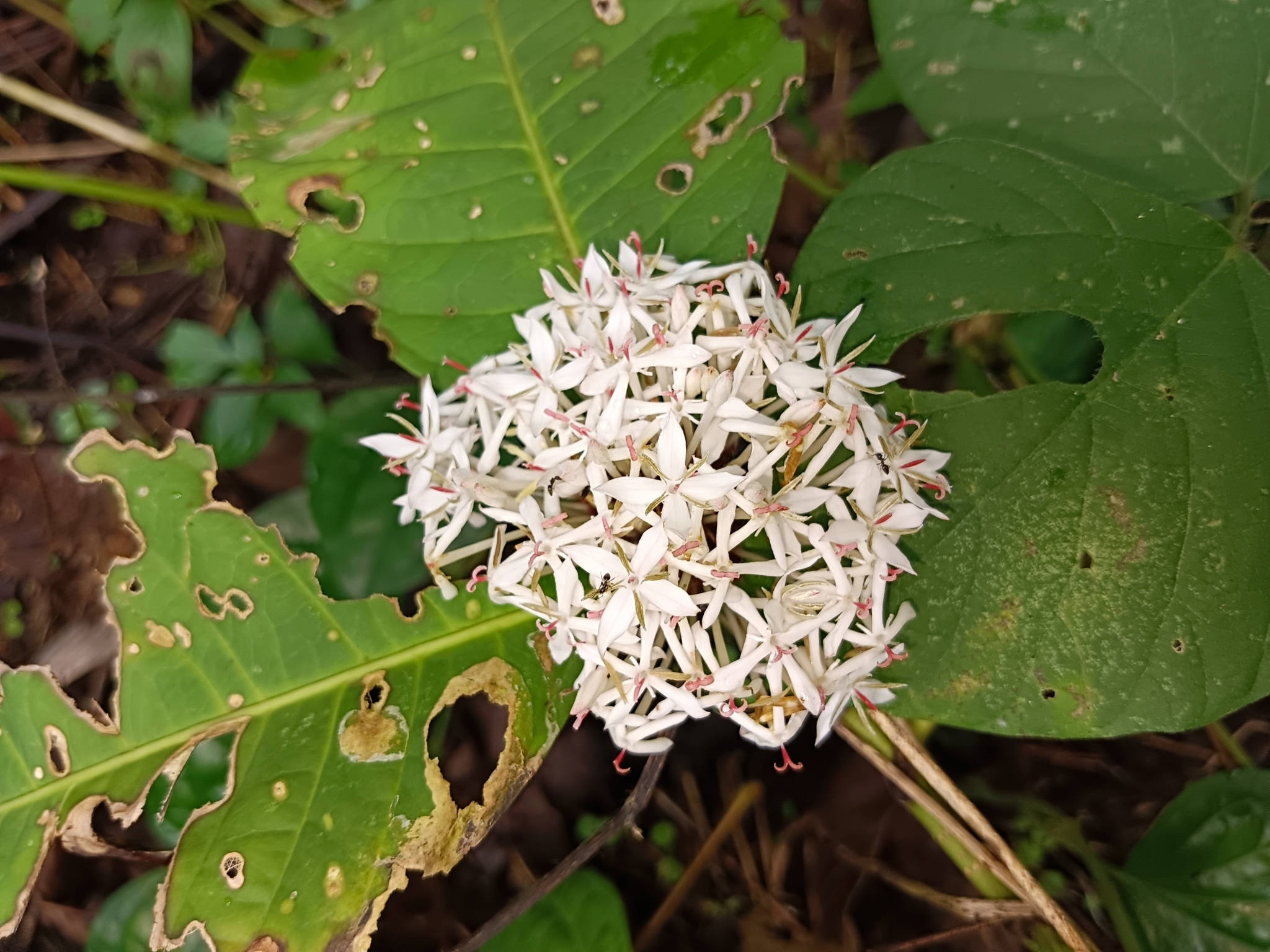

Conservation status
- Critically Endangered (IUCN 2.3)

Scientific classification
- Kingdom: Plantae
- Clade: Tracheophytes
- Clade: Angiosperms
- Clade: Eudicots
- Clade: Asterids
- Order: Gentianales
- Family: Rubiaceae
- Genus: Ixora
- Species: I. johnsonii

Binomial name
- Ixora johnsonii Hook.f.

= Ixora johnsonii =

Species of plant

Ixora johnsonii is a species of flowering plant in the family Rubiaceae. It is a shrub or tree endemic to Ernakulam District of central Kerala state in southwestern India, where it grows in coastal moist forest.

The species was first described by Joseph Dalton Hooker in 1880.
