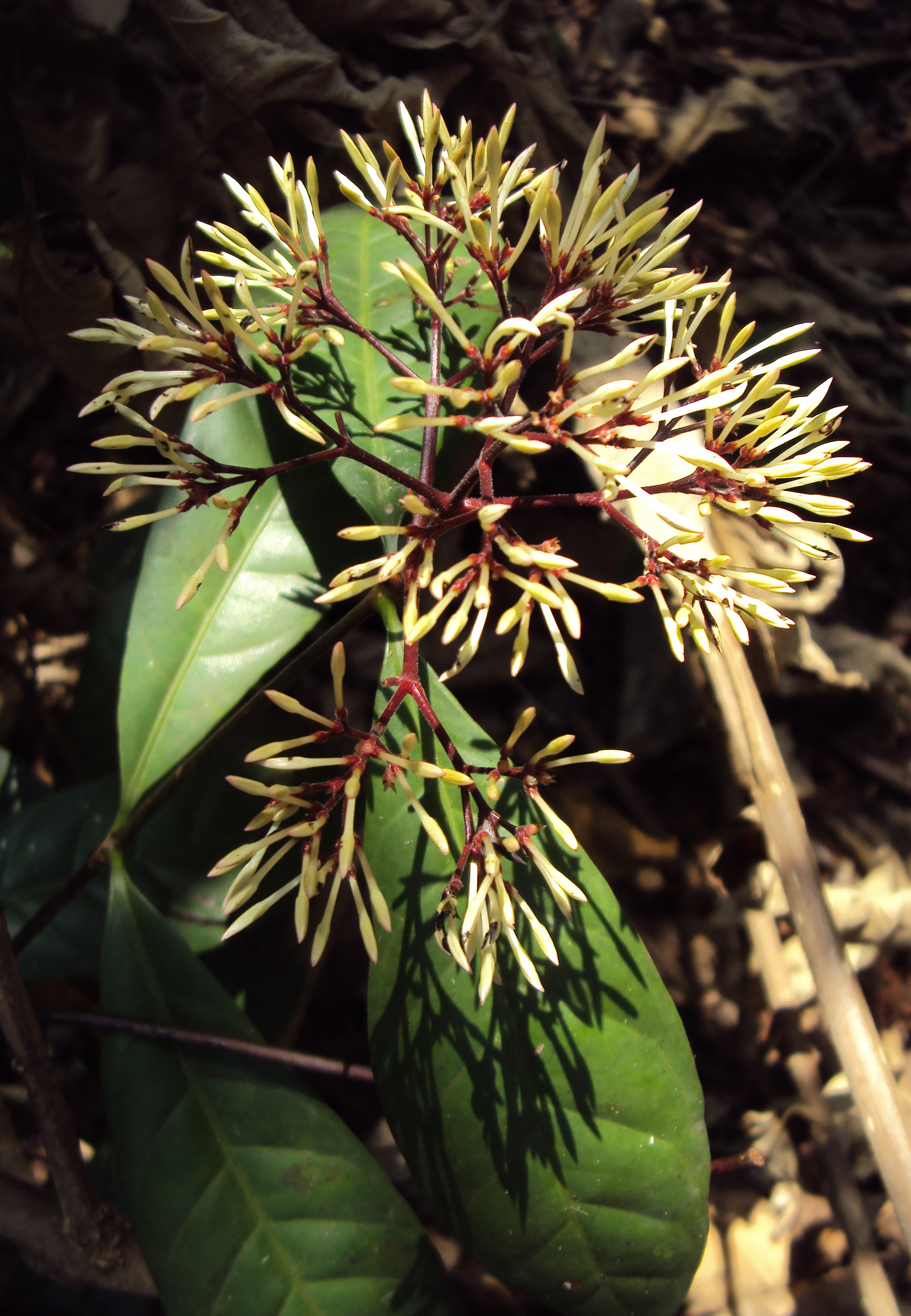
- Flower buds

Scientific classification
- Kingdom: Plantae
- Clade: Tracheophytes
- Clade: Angiosperms
- Clade: Eudicots
- Clade: Asterids
- Order: Gentianales
- Family: Rubiaceae
- Genus: Ixora
- Species: I. nigricans

Binomial name
- Ixora nigricans R.Br. ex Wight & Arn. (1834)

Synonyms
- Ixora affinis Wall. ex Craib; Ixora affinis var. arguta (Hook.f.) Craib; Ixora affinis var. plumea (Ridl.) Craib; Ixora arguta (Hook.f.) King & Gamble; Ixora densa R.Br. ex Wall. [Invalid]; Ixora erubescens Wall. ex G.Don; Ixora memecylifolia Kurz; Ixora nigricans var. arguta Hook.f.; Ixora nigricans var. erubrescens (Wall. ex G.Don) Kurz; Ixora nigricans var. ovalis Pierre ex Pit.; Ixora plumea Ridl.; Pavetta erubescens (Wall. ex G.Don) Miq.

= Ixora nigricans =

Black ixora

Species of plant

Ixora nigricans, or black ixora, is a plant growing up to a height of 5 metres (16 ft). It is found as common undergrowth in evergreen forests to dry evergreen forests up to 1,900 m (6,230 ft). Black ixora is found in throughout the forests of the Western Ghats of India.
