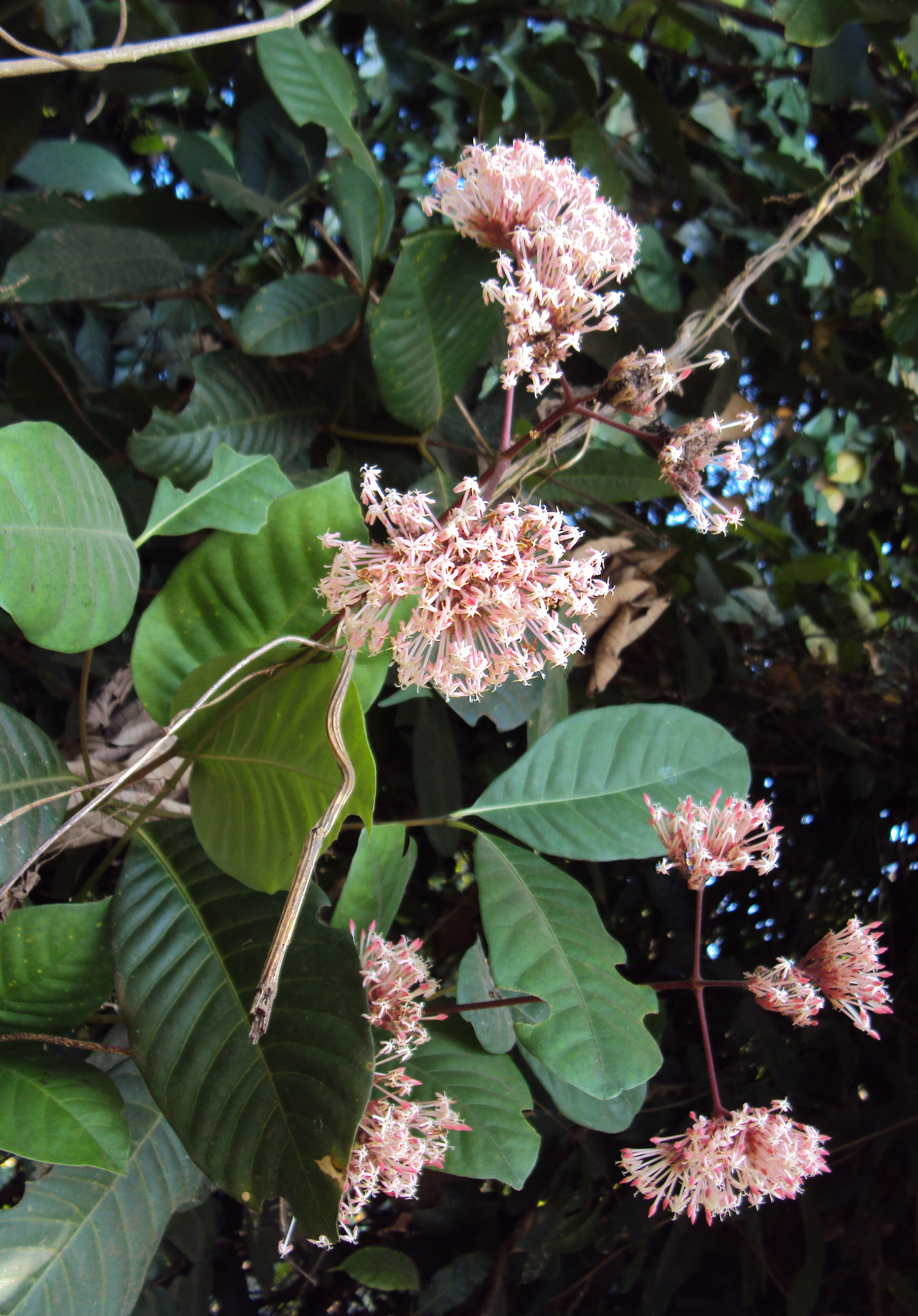
- Flowers

Scientific classification
- Kingdom: Plantae
- Clade: Tracheophytes
- Clade: Angiosperms
- Clade: Eudicots
- Clade: Asterids
- Order: Gentianales
- Family: Rubiaceae
- Genus: Ixora
- Species: I. elongata

Binomial name
- Ixora elongata B.Heyne ex G.Don

SynonymsFrom theplantlist.org
- Ixora pedunculata Dalzell

= Ixora elongata =

Species of plant

Ixora elongata, the rosy ixora, is a small tree endemic to the Western Ghats of India. They are found as undergrowth in evergreen to dry evergreen and semi-evergreen forests between 300 and 900 m.
