= Ixora nigerica =

Conservation status
- Vulnerable (IUCN 2.3)

Scientific classification
- Kingdom: Plantae
- Clade: Tracheophytes
- Clade: Angiosperms
- Clade: Eudicots
- Clade: Asterids
- Order: Gentianales
- Family: Rubiaceae
- Genus: Ixora
- Species: I. nigerica

Binomial name
- Ixora nigerica Keay

Species of plant

Ixora nigerica is a species of flowering plant in the family Rubiaceae. It is found in west tropical Africa.

The scientific name for the taxon was first published in 1957 by Ronald William John Keay.
