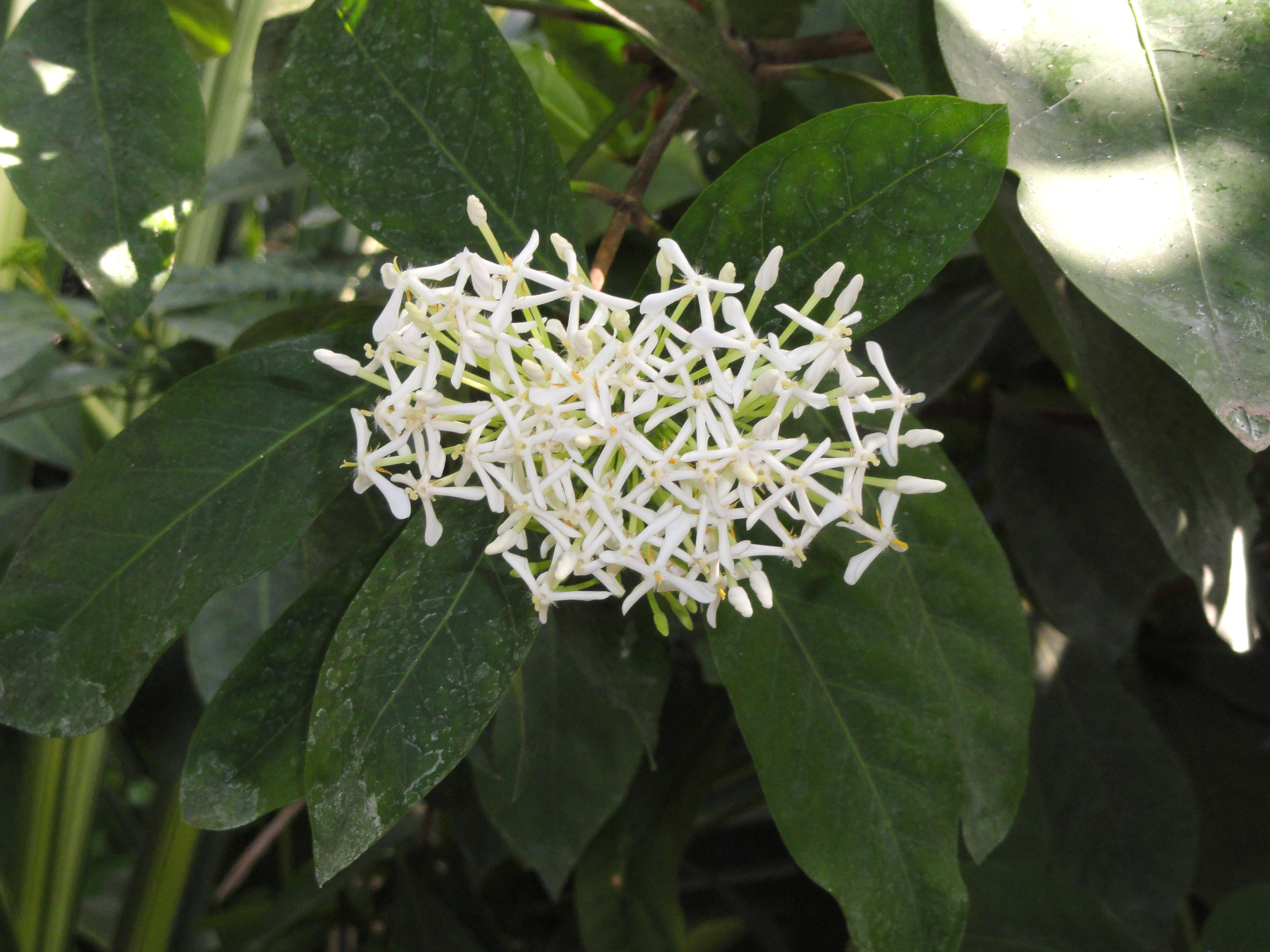

Scientific classification
- Kingdom: Plantae
- Clade: Tracheophytes
- Clade: Angiosperms
- Clade: Eudicots
- Clade: Asterids
- Order: Gentianales
- Family: Rubiaceae
- Genus: Ixora
- Species: I. finlaysoniana

Binomial name
- Ixora finlaysoniana Wall. ex G.Don

Synonyms
- Ixora denticulata Pierre ex Pit.; Ixora findlayana B.S.Williams; Ixora merguensis var. parvifolia F.N.Williams

= Ixora finlaysoniana =

Species of plant

Ixora finlaysoniana is a species of shrub in the family Rubiaceae. It is native to Southeast Asia, China, NE India and Philippines.
