= Ixora pudica =

Conservation status
- Near Threatened (IUCN 3.1)

Scientific classification
- Kingdom: Plantae
- Clade: Embryophytes
- Clade: Tracheophytes
- Clade: Spermatophytes
- Clade: Angiosperms
- Clade: Eudicots
- Clade: Asterids
- Order: Gentianales
- Family: Rubiaceae
- Genus: Ixora
- Species: I. pudica

Binomial name
- Ixora pudica Baker

Species of plant

Ixora pudica is a species of flowering plant in the family Rubiaceae. It is endemic to Seychelles.
