= Ixora killipii =

Scientific classification
- Kingdom: Plantae
- Clade: Tracheophytes
- Clade: Angiosperms
- Clade: Eudicots
- Clade: Asterids
- Order: Gentianales
- Family: Rubiaceae
- Genus: Ixora
- Species: I. killipii

Binomial name
- Ixora killipii Standl.

Species of tree

Ixora killipii is a species of shrub or small tree in the family Rubiaceae. It is native to South America.
