= Ixora ooumuensis =

Conservation status
- Data Deficient (IUCN 2.3)

Scientific classification
- Kingdom: Plantae
- Clade: Tracheophytes
- Clade: Angiosperms
- Clade: Eudicots
- Clade: Asterids
- Order: Gentianales
- Family: Rubiaceae
- Genus: Ixora
- Species: I. ooumuensis

Binomial name
- Ixora ooumuensis J.Florence (1986)

Species of plant

Ixora ooumuensis is a species of flowering plant in the family Rubiaceae. It is endemic to the island of Nuku Hiva in the Marquesas Islands of French Polynesia.
