= Ixora panurensis =

Scientific classification
- Kingdom: Plantae
- Clade: Tracheophytes
- Clade: Angiosperms
- Clade: Eudicots
- Clade: Asterids
- Order: Gentianales
- Family: Rubiaceae
- Genus: Ixora
- Species: I. panurensis

Binomial name
- Ixora panurensis Müll. Arg.

Species of tree

Ixora panurensis is a species of shrub or tree in the family Rubiaceae. It is native to South America.
