= Ixora st-johnii =

Conservation status
- Data Deficient (IUCN 3.1)

Scientific classification
- Kingdom: Plantae
- Clade: Embryophytes
- Clade: Tracheophytes
- Clade: Angiosperms
- Clade: Eudicots
- Clade: Asterids
- Order: Gentianales
- Family: Rubiaceae
- Genus: Ixora
- Species: I. st-johnii

Binomial name
- Ixora st-johnii Fosberg

Species of plant

Ixora st-johnii is a species of flowering plant in the family Rubiaceae. It is a tree endemic to the island Huahine in French Polynesia.
