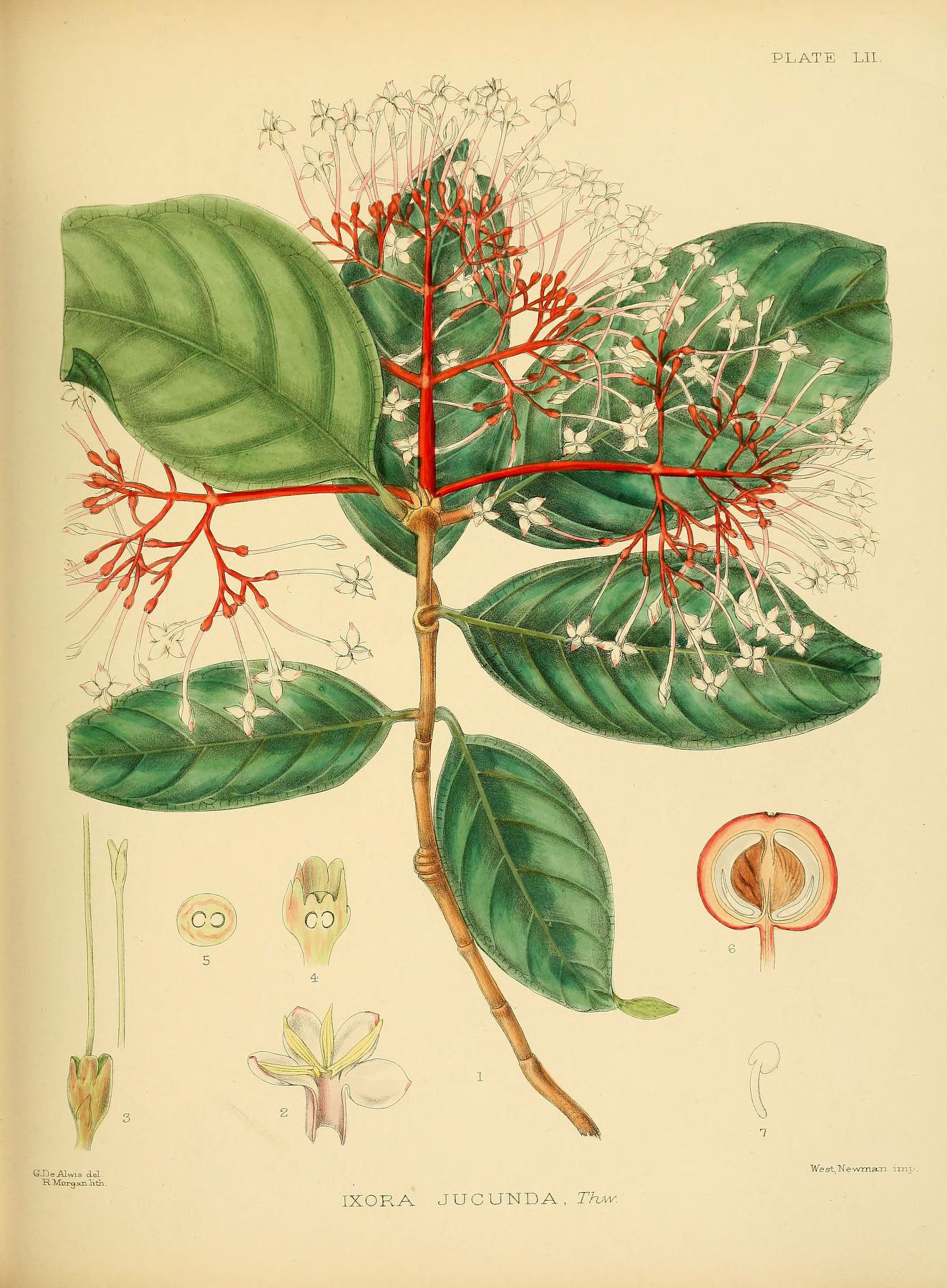

Conservation status
- Vulnerable (IUCN 2.3)

Scientific classification
- Kingdom: Plantae
- Clade: Tracheophytes
- Clade: Angiosperms
- Clade: Eudicots
- Clade: Asterids
- Order: Gentianales
- Family: Rubiaceae
- Genus: Ixora
- Species: I. jucunda

Binomial name
- Ixora jucunda Thwaites

= Ixora jucunda =

Species of plant

Ixora jucunda is a species of flowering plant in the family Rubiaceae. It is endemic to Sri Lanka.

== Leaves ==
Large, oval to lanceolate, acute ends.

== Trunk ==
Branchlets stout with nodal thickenings.

== Flowers ==
White or pink, sweet-scented, calyx often red; Inflorescenece - large cymes.

== Fruits ==
Globose berry.

== Ecology ==
Rain forest understory of wet zone.

== Uses ==
Ornamental.
