= Ixora beckleri =

Scientific classification
- Kingdom: Plantae
- Clade: Tracheophytes
- Clade: Angiosperms
- Clade: Eudicots
- Clade: Asterids
- Order: Gentianales
- Family: Rubiaceae
- Genus: Ixora
- Species: I. beckleri

Binomial name
- Ixora beckleri Benth.

Species of plant

Ixora beckleri, commonly known as brown coffeewood, is a species of flowering plant in the family Rubiaceae. It is endemic to rainforests of eastern Australia, south to Forster in New South Wales.
