= Ixora foliosa =

Conservation status
- Vulnerable (IUCN 3.1)

Scientific classification
- Kingdom: Plantae
- Clade: Tracheophytes
- Clade: Angiosperms
- Clade: Eudicots
- Clade: Asterids
- Order: Gentianales
- Family: Rubiaceae
- Genus: Ixora
- Species: I. foliosa

Binomial name
- Ixora foliosa Hiern

Species of plant

Ixora foliosa is a species of flowering plant in the family Rubiaceae. It is found in western Cameroon and eastern Nigeria. Its natural habitats are subtropical or tropical moist lowland forests and subtropical or tropical moist montane forests. It is threatened by habitat loss.
