= Ixora euosmia =

Conservation status
- Near Threatened (IUCN 3.1)

Scientific classification
- Kingdom: Plantae
- Clade: Tracheophytes
- Clade: Angiosperms
- Clade: Eudicots
- Clade: Asterids
- Order: Gentianales
- Family: Rubiaceae
- Genus: Ixora
- Species: I. euosmia

Binomial name
- Ixora euosmia K.Schum.

Synonyms
- Ixora degemensis Hutch. & Dalziel

Species of plant

Ixora euosmia is a species of flowering plant in the family Rubiaceae. It is endemic to southern Nigeria and southwestern Cameroon.
