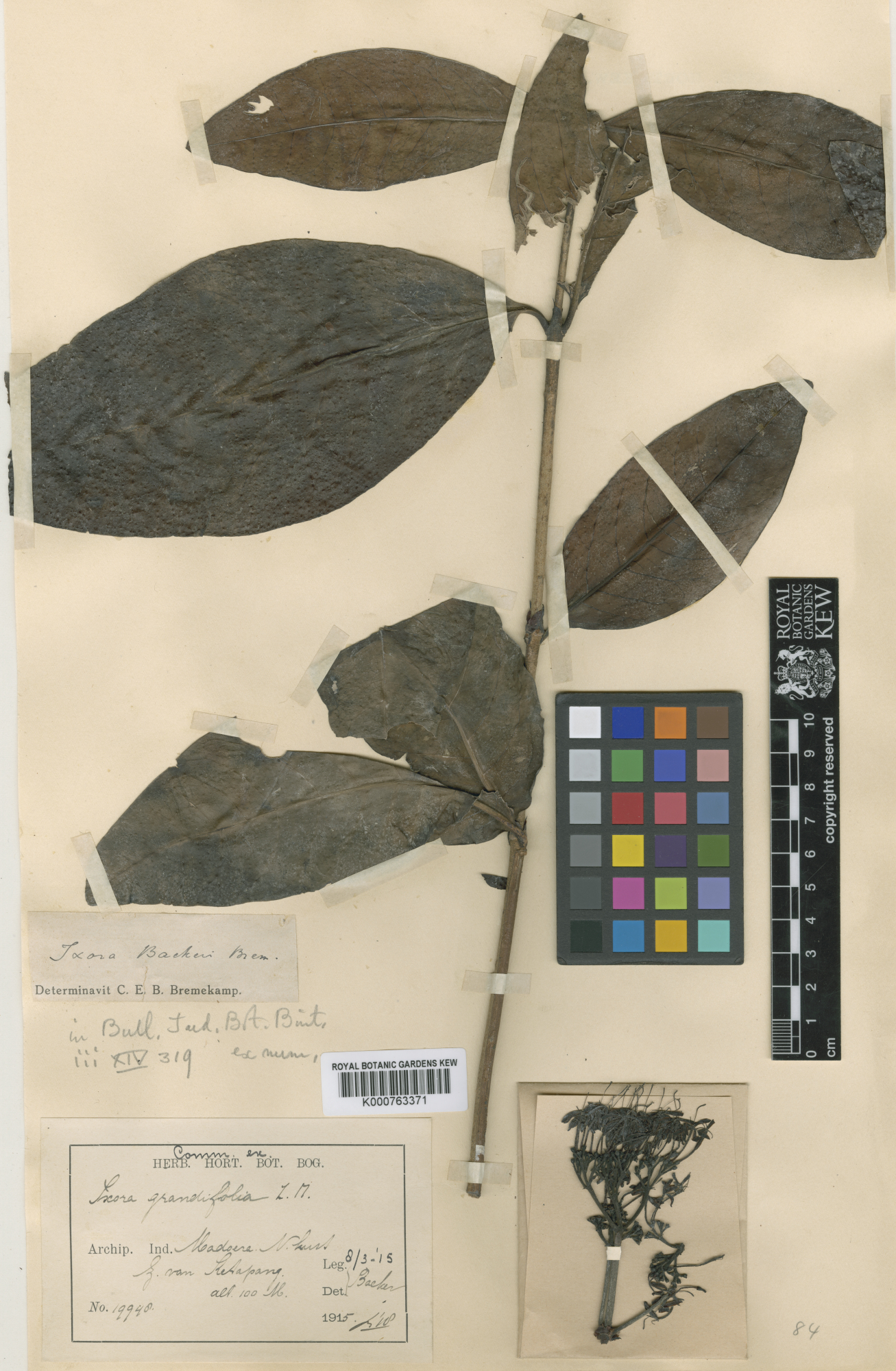
- Leafs of Ixora backeri collected in 1915

Scientific classification
- Kingdom: Plantae
- Clade: Tracheophytes
- Clade: Angiosperms
- Clade: Eudicots
- Clade: Asterids
- Order: Gentianales
- Family: Rubiaceae
- Genus: Ixora
- Species: I. backeri

Binomial name
- Ixora backeri Bremek.

= Ixora backeri =

Black ixora

Species of plant

Ixora backeri is a shrub that grows primarily in the wet tropical biome of the Indonesian islands of Java and Madura.
