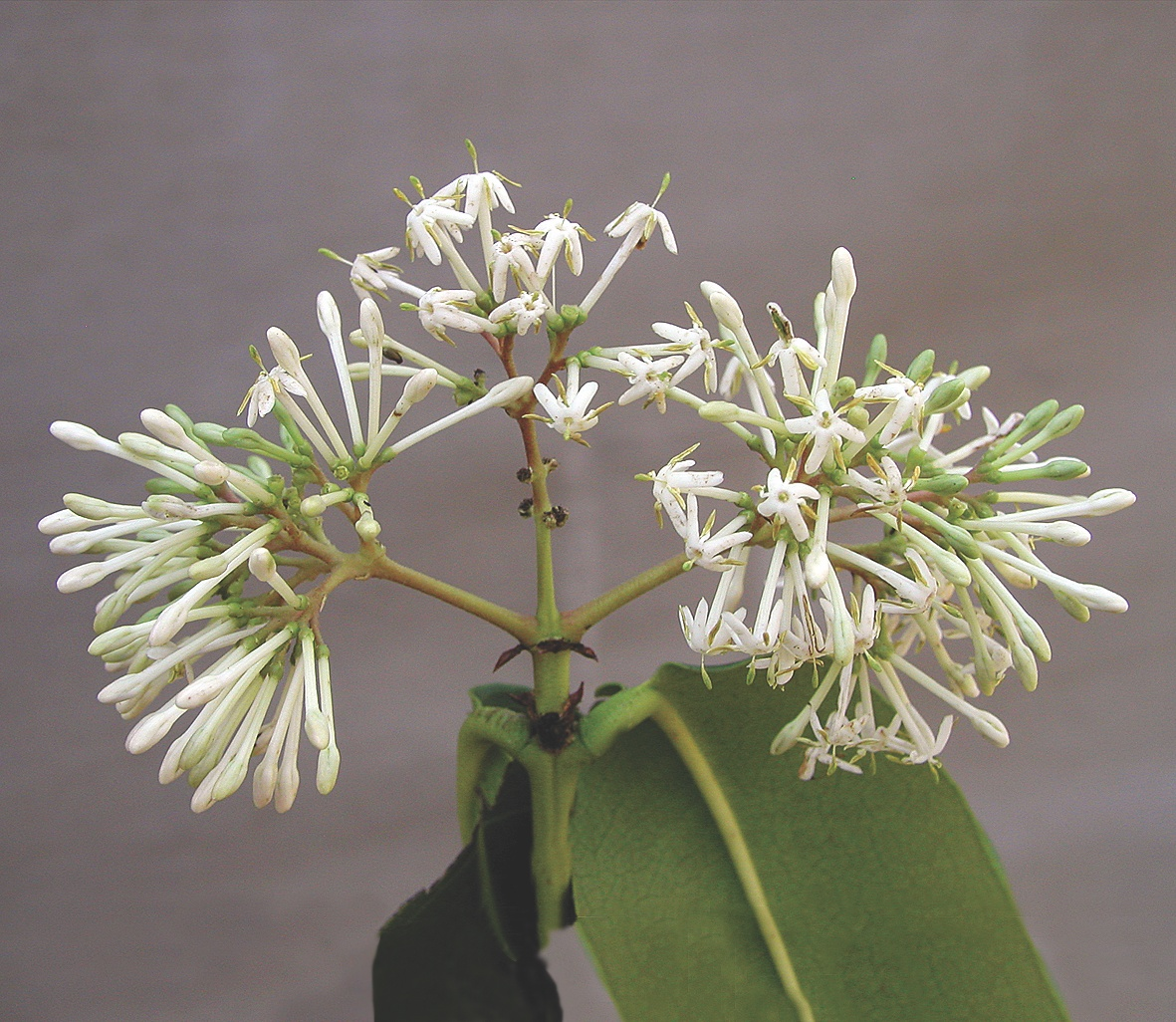
- Ixora pavetta flower

Scientific classification
- Kingdom: Plantae
- Clade: Tracheophytes
- Clade: Angiosperms
- Clade: Eudicots
- Clade: Asterids
- Order: Gentianales
- Family: Rubiaceae
- Genus: Ixora
- Species: I. pavetta

Binomial name
- Ixora pavetta Andrews

= Ixora pavetta =

Species of plant

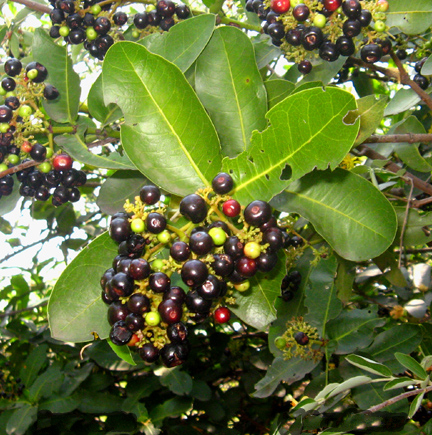
Ixora pavetta - fruits seen in Daroji Bear Sanctuary in April 2015

Ixora pavetta, the torch tree, is a plant in the family Rubiaceae. This species is found in South Asia. The species is commonly seen in Ballari district of Karnataka, India. People use the branches of this tree for making walls and paste with mud for their thatched huts in villages, but now this practice has become obsolete owing to modern housing materials.

Summer is the fruiting season and the fruits are globose, 2-seeded, become black when ripened. Indian sloth bears eat the fruits and the seeds are dispersed through its scat.

It is a shrub or small tree native to South Asia, including India, Sri Lanka, Bangladesh, Myanmar, and the Nicobar Islands. The species is commonly known as the torch tree due to its clusters of small white flowers.

== Description ==
Ixora pavetta grows as an evergreen shrub or small tree. The leaves are simple, opposite, glossy, and elliptic to lanceolate in shape. The plant produces dense terminal clusters of fragrant white flowers. The fruits are globose berries that turn black when ripe and usually contain two seeds.

== Distribution and habitat ==
The species is native to tropical regions of South Asia and grows mainly in wet tropical biomes. It occurs in forests and moist habitats and is distributed in India, Sri Lanka, Bangladesh, Myanmar, and the Nicobar Islands.

== Traditional uses ==
Various parts of the plant have been used in traditional medicine systems such as Ayurveda and Siddha. Ethnobotanical reports describe the use of the species for treating wounds, skin infections, diarrhoea, dysentery, and urinary disorders.

== Taxonomy ==
The species was first described by Henry Andrews in 1799. Synonyms of the species include Ixora arborea Roxb. ex Sm. and Ixora decipiens DC.
