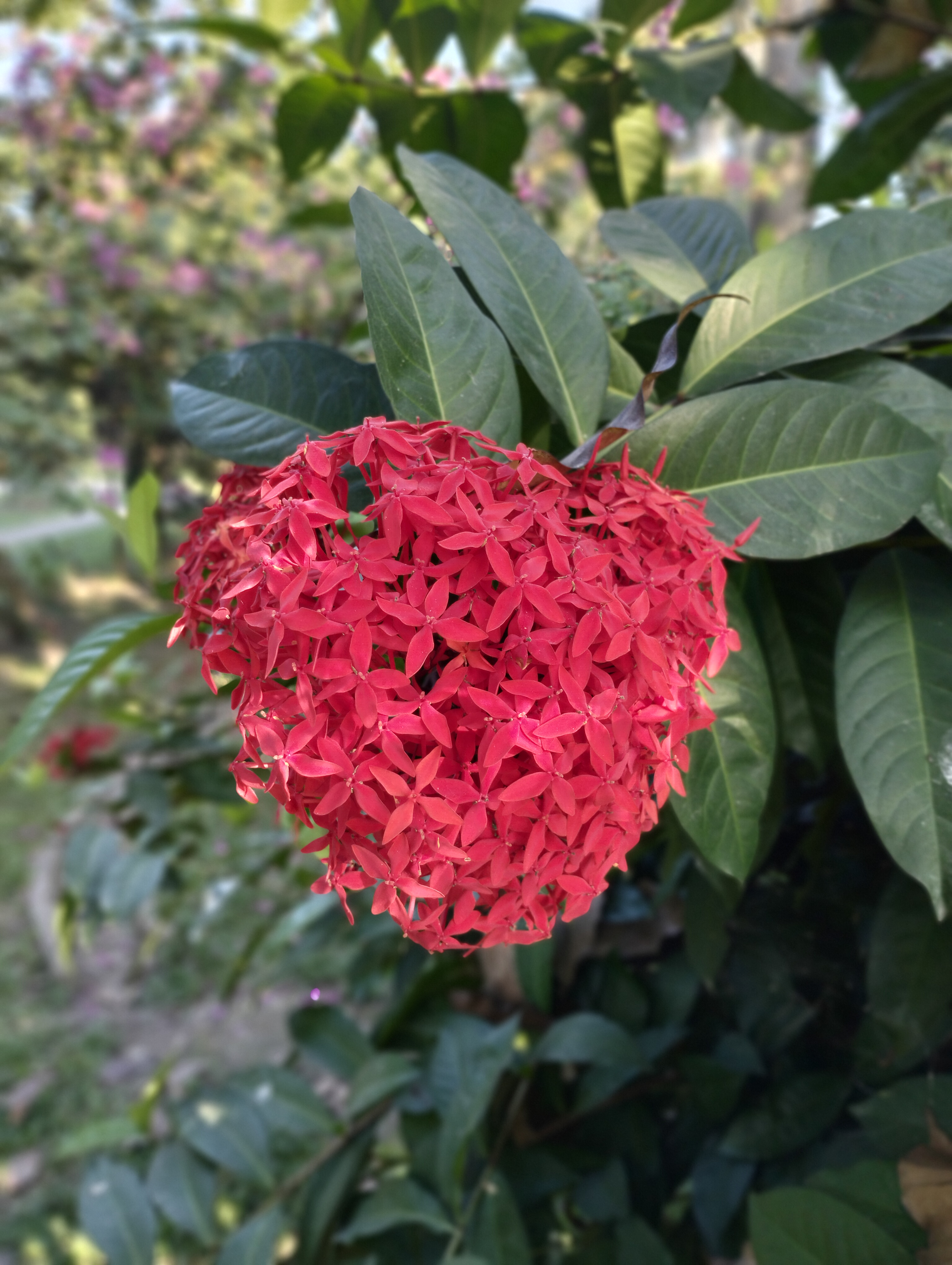
- Chinese ixora

Scientific classification
- Kingdom: Plantae
- Clade: Embryophytes
- Clade: Tracheophytes
- Clade: Spermatophytes
- Clade: Angiosperms
- Clade: Eudicots
- Clade: Asterids
- Order: Gentianales
- Family: Rubiaceae
- Subfamily: Ixoroideae
- Tribe: Ixoreae
- Genus: Ixora; L.

Type species
- Ixora coccinea L.

Species
- About 544, see List of Ixora species

Synonyms
- Becheria Ridl.; Bemsetia Raf.; Captaincookia N.Hallé; Charpentiera Vieill.; Doricera Verdc.; Hitoa Nadeaud; Myonima Comm. ex A.Juss.; Panchezia Montrouz.; Patabea Aubl.; Schetii Adans.; Siderodendrum Schreb.; Sideroxyloides Jacq.; Thouarsiora Homolle ex Arènes; Tsiangia H.H.Hsue & P.T.Li; Versteegia Valeton

= Ixora =

Genus of plants

Ixora is a genus of flowering plants in the family Rubiaceae. It is the only genus in the tribe Ixoreae. It consists of tropical evergreen trees and shrubs and holds around 544 species. Though native to the tropical and subtropical areas throughout the world, its centre of diversity is in Tropical Asia. Ixora also grows commonly in subtropical climates in the United States, such as Florida where it is commonly known as West Indian jasmine.

== Name ==
Ixora is Latinized from Sanskrit Ishwara, one of the names of the Hindu god Shiva. The genus was formally created by Linnaeus in 1753, as it was noted by Hendrik van Rheede that the flowers of what he noted as schetti (and named by Rheede as Ixora coccinea) were offered in temples in the Malabar.

Other common names include viruchi, kiskaara, kepale, rangan, kheme, ponna, chann tanea, techi, pan, siantan, jarum-jarum/jejarum, cây trang thái, jungle flame, jungle geranium, and cruz de Malta, among others.

== Description ==
The plants possess leathery leaves, ranging from 7.6 to 15.2 cm (3 to 6 in) in length, and produce large clusters of tiny flowers in the summer. Members of Ixora prefer acidic soil, and are suitable choices for bonsai. It is also a popular choice for hedges in parts of South East Asia. In tropical climates, they flower year round and are commonly used in Hindu worship, as well as in ayurveda and Indian folk medicine.

== Pests and diseases ==
In Brazil, fungal species Pseudocercospora ixoricola was found to be causing leaf spots on Ixora coccinea. Then in 2018, in Taiwan, during a fungal study, it was found that the species Pseudopestalotiopsis ixorae and Pseudopestalotiopsis taiwanensis caused leaf spots on species of Ixora, which is a popular garden plant in Taiwan.

== Selected species ==
- Ixora albersii K.Schum.
- Ixora backeri Bremek.
- Ixora beckleri Benth.
- Ixora brevipedunculata Fosberg
- Ixora calycina Thwaites
- Ixora chinensis Lam.
- Ixora coccinea L.
- Ixora elongata B.Heyne ex G.Don
- Ixora euosmia K.Schum.
- Ixora finlaysoniana Wall. ex G.Don
- Ixora foliosa Hiern
- Ixora johnsonii Hook.f.
- Ixora jucunda Thwaites
- Ixora killipii Standl.
- Ixora lawsonii Gamble
- Ixora malabarica (Dennst.) Mabb.
- Ixora margaretae (N.Hallé) Mouly & B.Bremer
- Ixora marquesensis F.Br.
- Ixora mooreensis (Nadeaud) Fosberg
- Ixora nigerica Keay
- Ixora nigricans R.Br. ex Wight & Arn.
- Ixora ooumuensis J.Florence
- Ixora panurensis Müll.Arg.
- Ixora pavetta Andr.
- Ixora peruviana (Spruce ex K.Schum.) Standl.
- Ixora pudica Baker
- Ixora raiateensis J.W.Moore
- Ixora raivavaensis Fosberg
- Ixora rufa Müll.Arg.
- Ixora saulierei Gamble
- Ixora setchellii Fosberg
- Ixora st-johnii Fosberg
- Ixora stokesii F.Br.
- Ixora temehaniensis J.W.Moore
- Ixora ulei K.Krause
- Ixora umbellata Valeton
- Ixora yavitensis Steyerm.

== Gallery ==
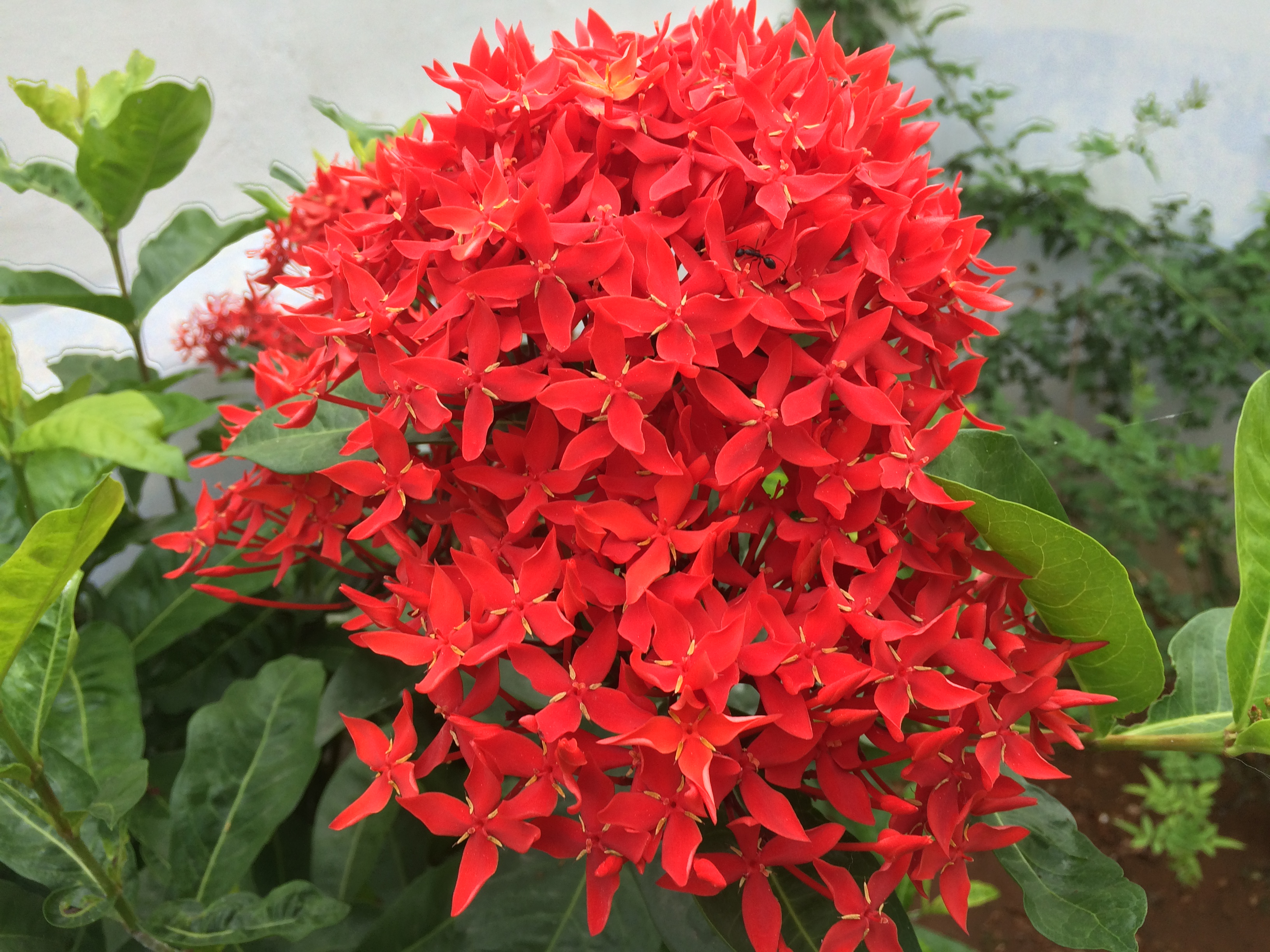
Ixora coccinea

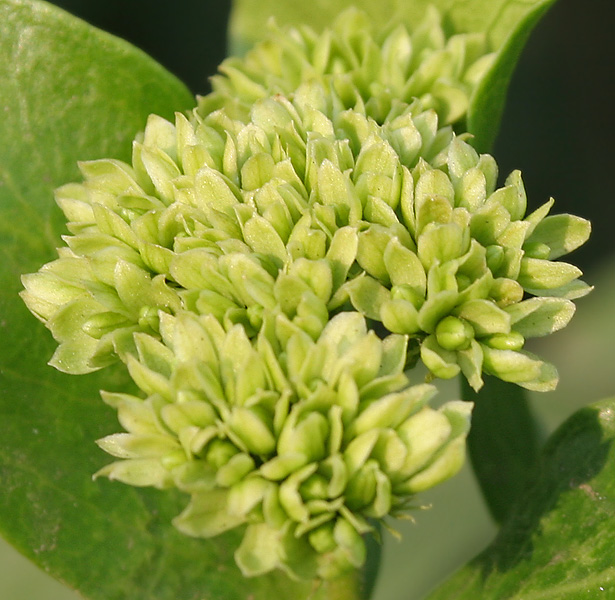
Ixora pavetta

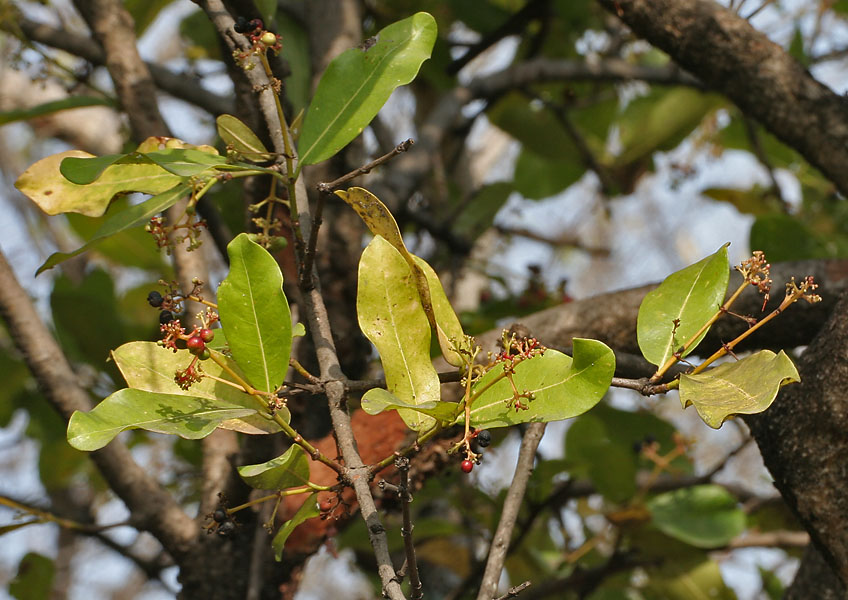
Ixora pavetta

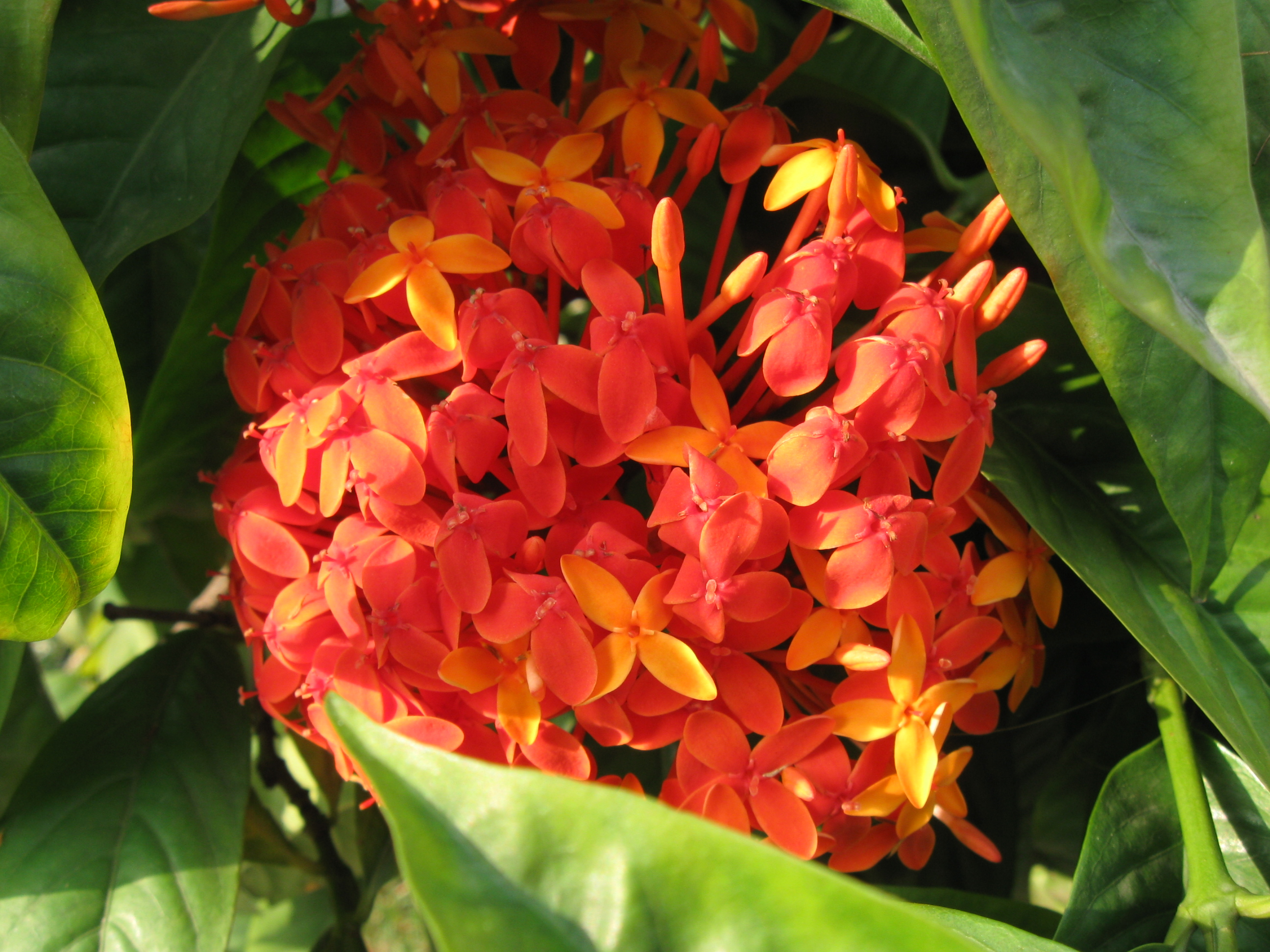
Ixora pavetta

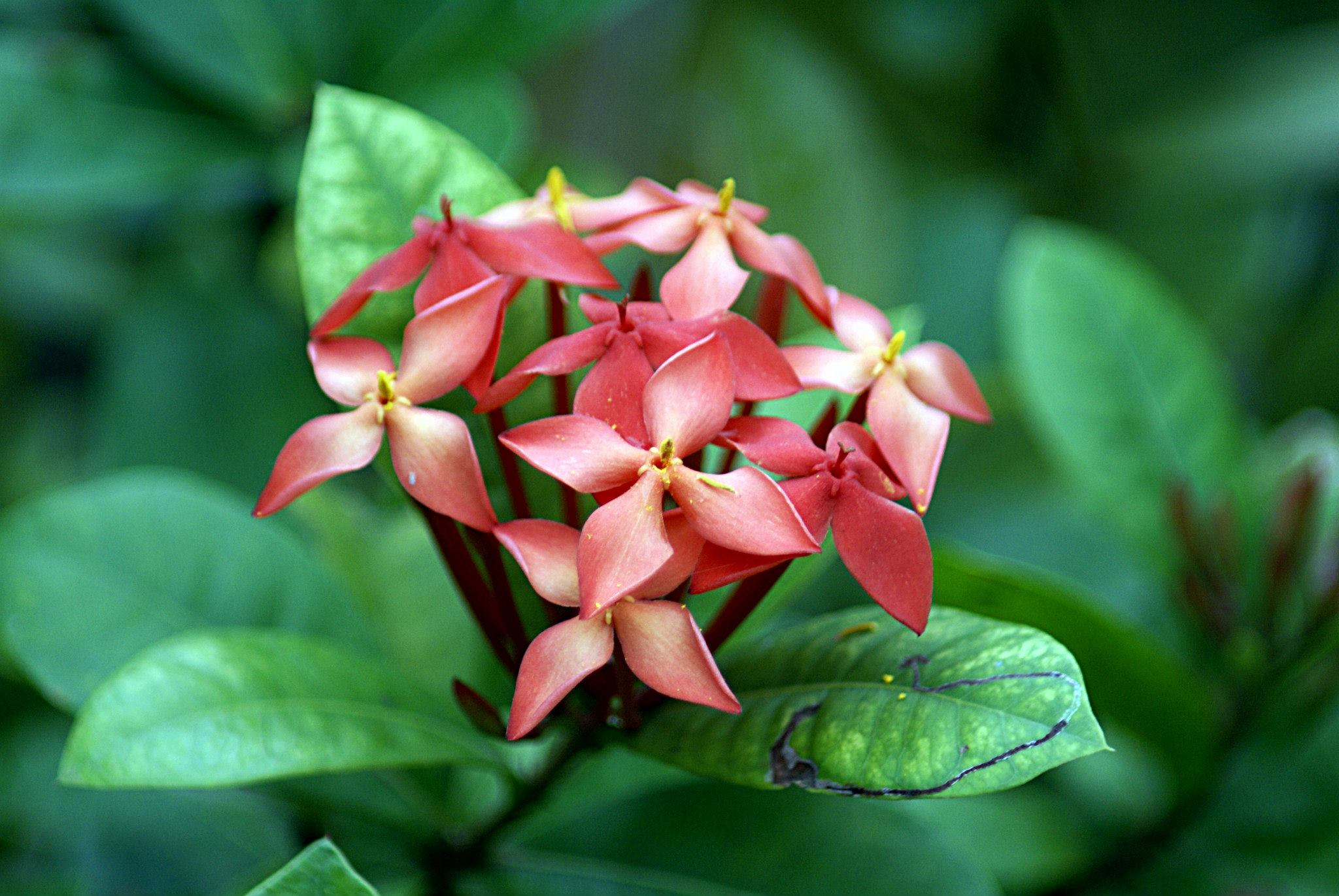
Ixora coccinea

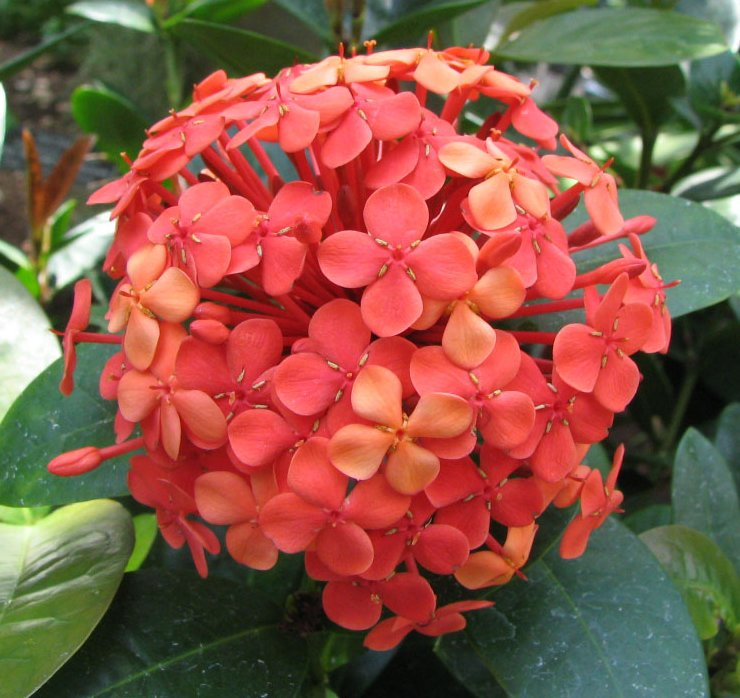
Ixora coccinea

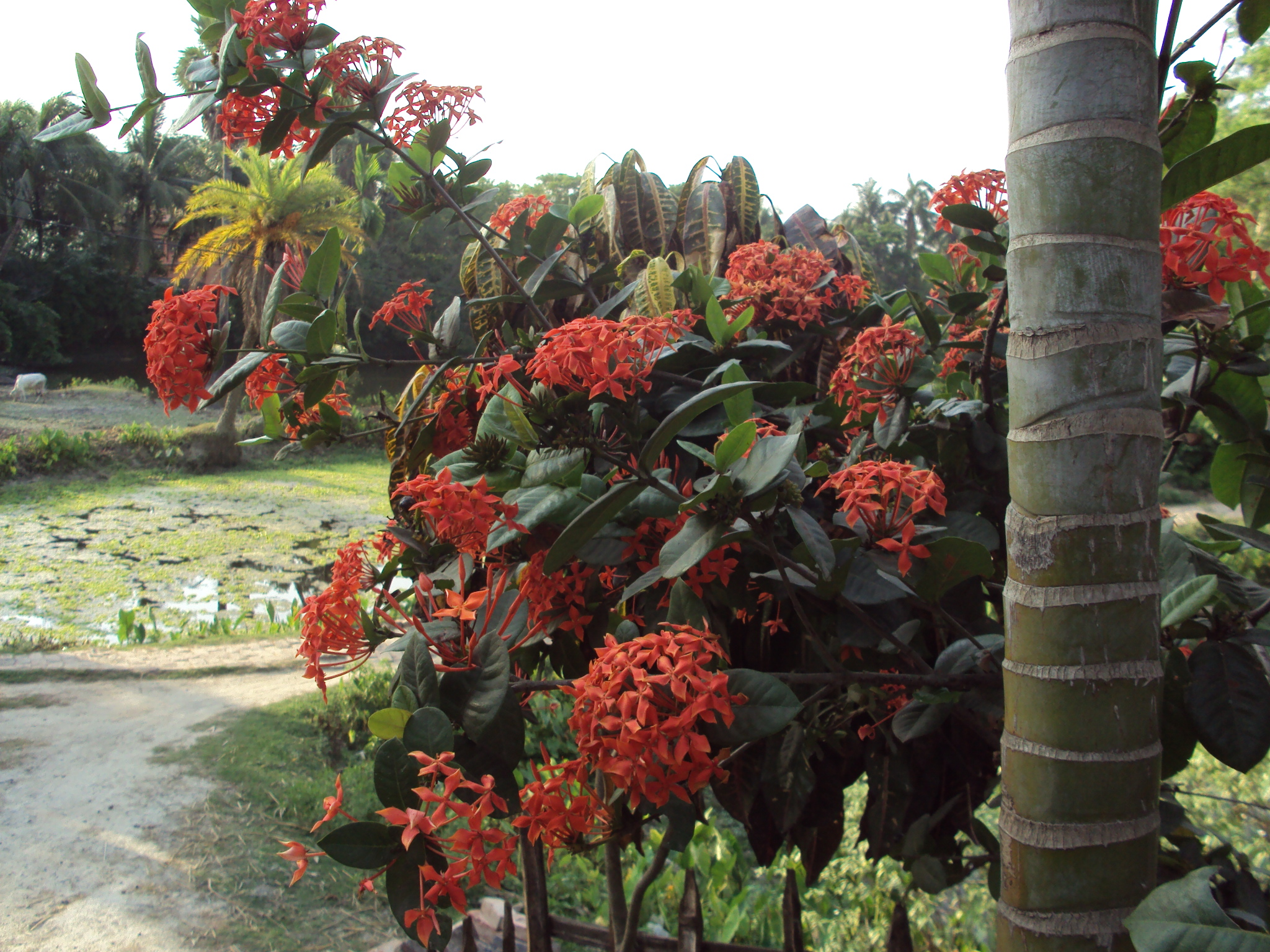
Ixora coccinea

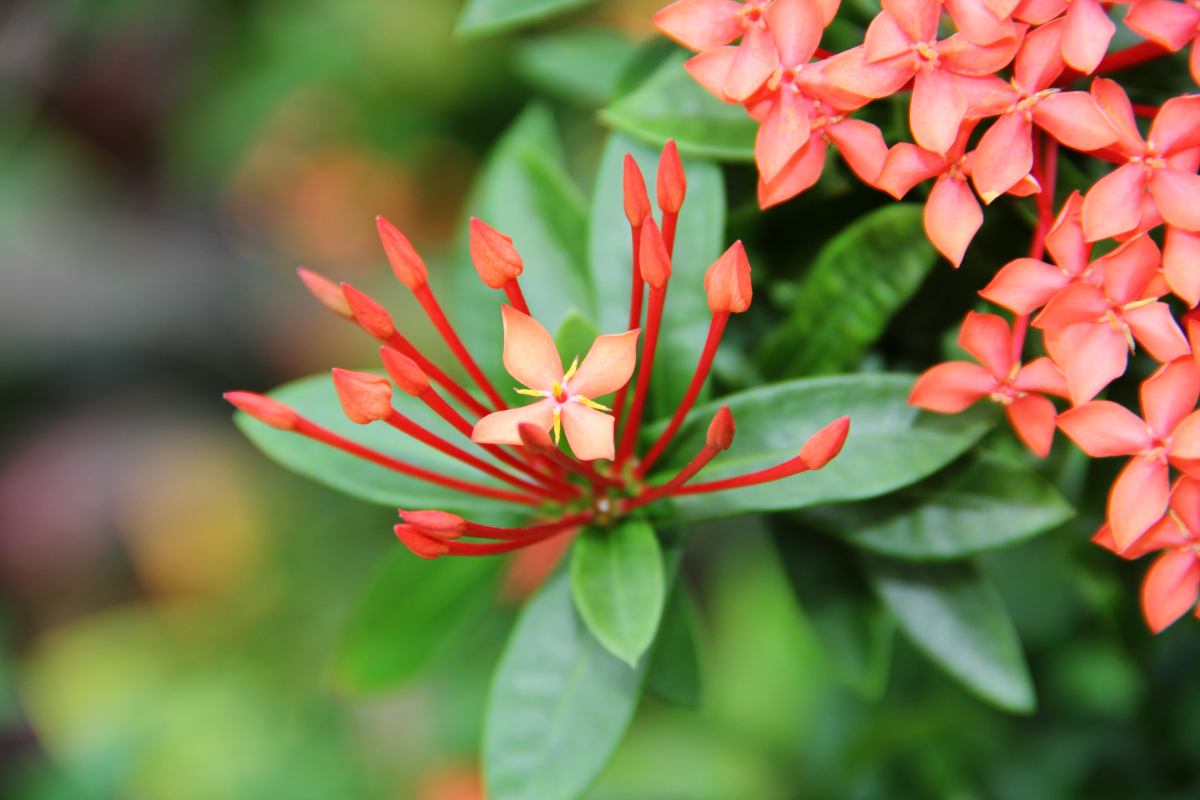
Ixora chinensis

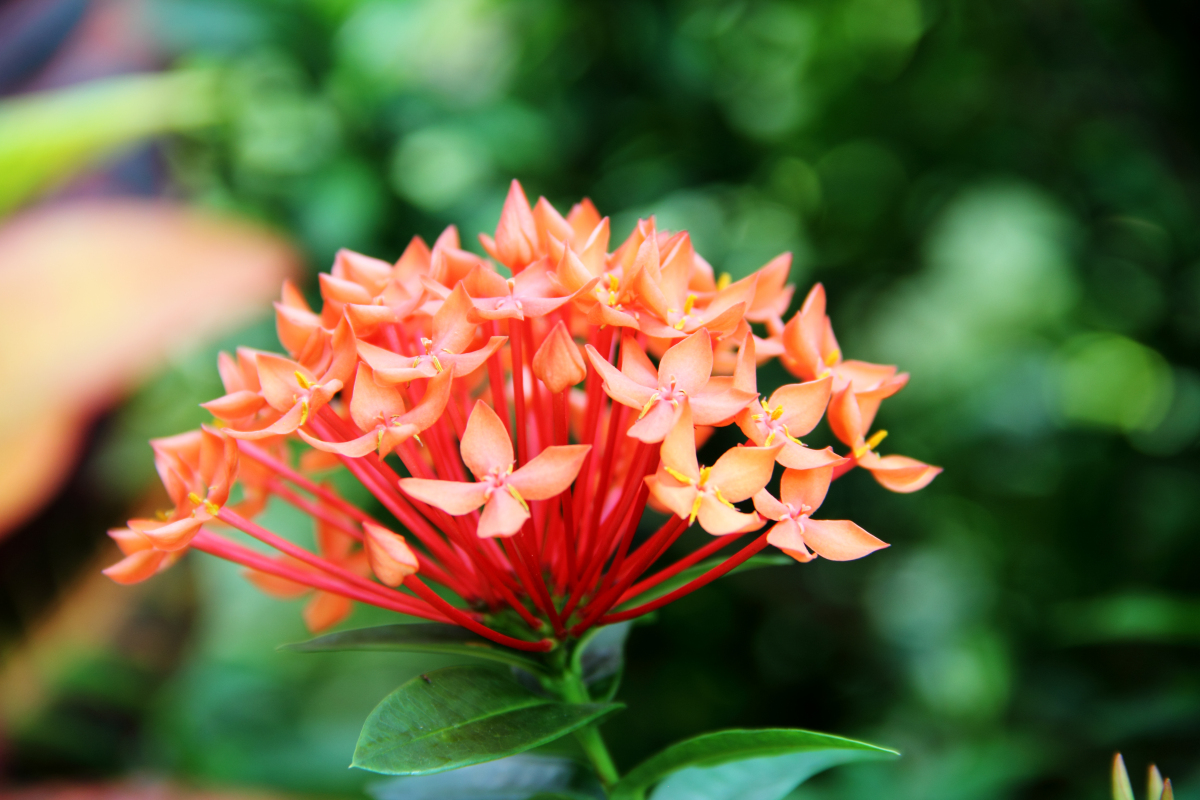
Ixora chinensis

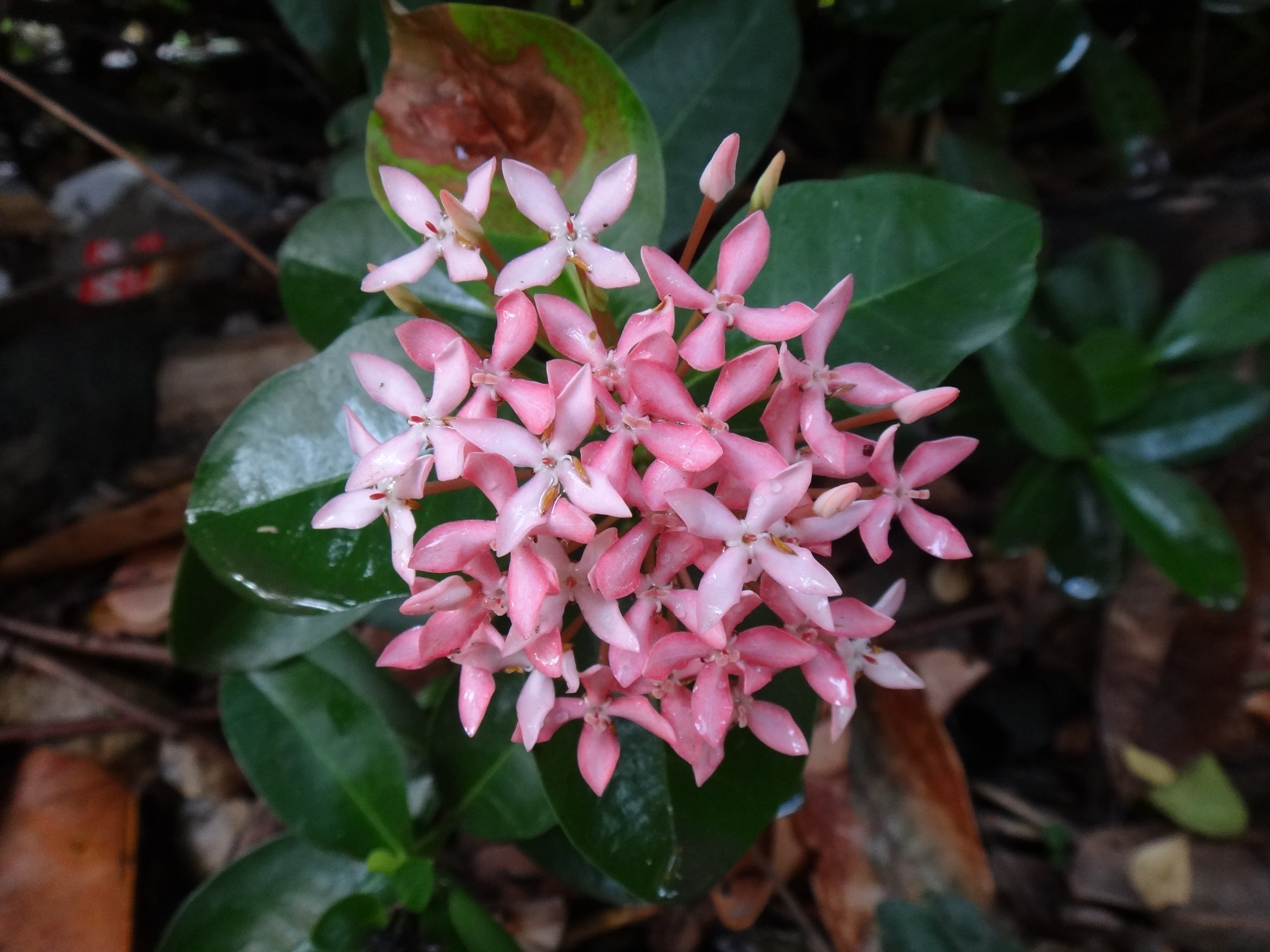
Whitish pink Ixora

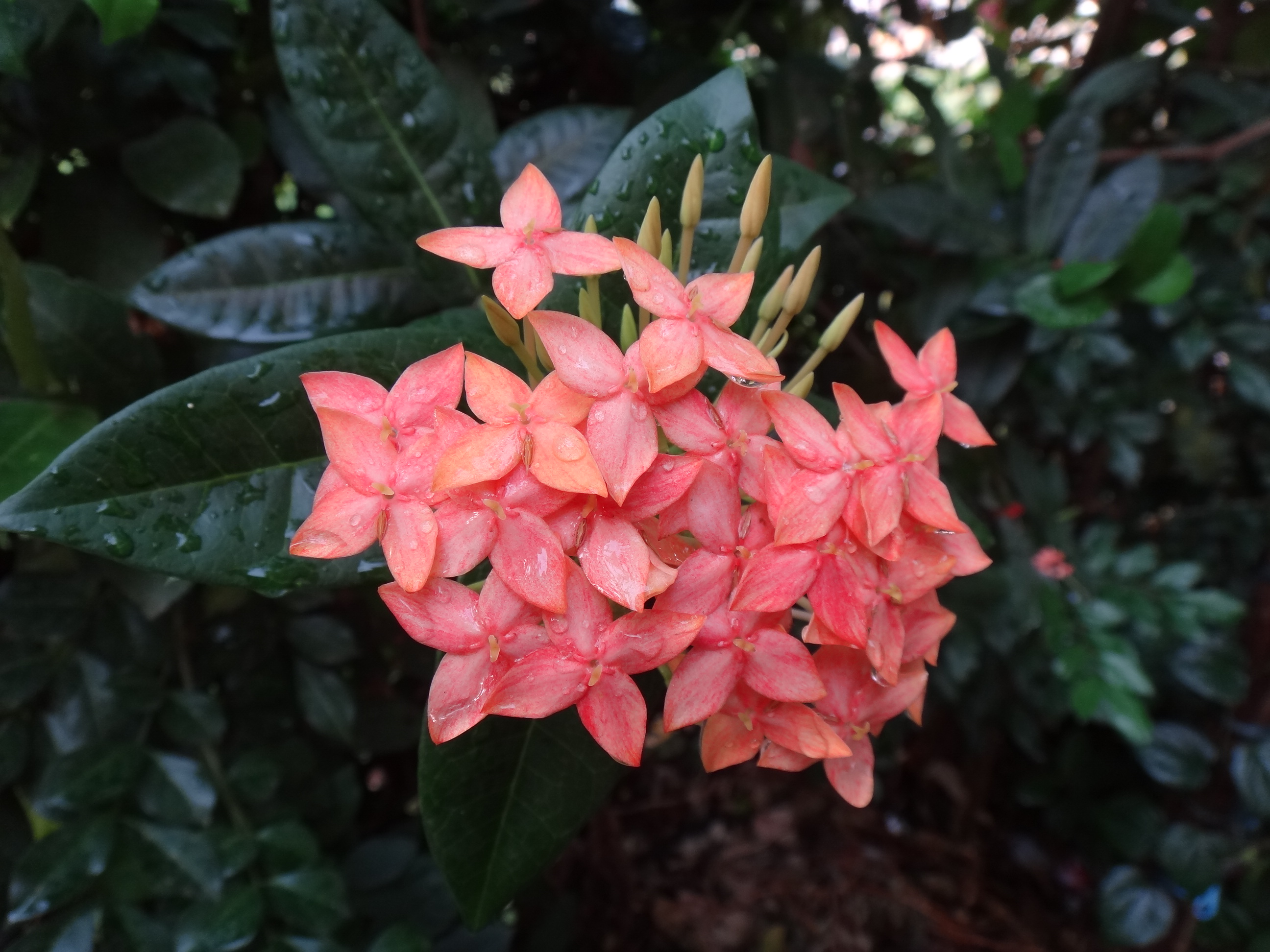
Pink orange ixora

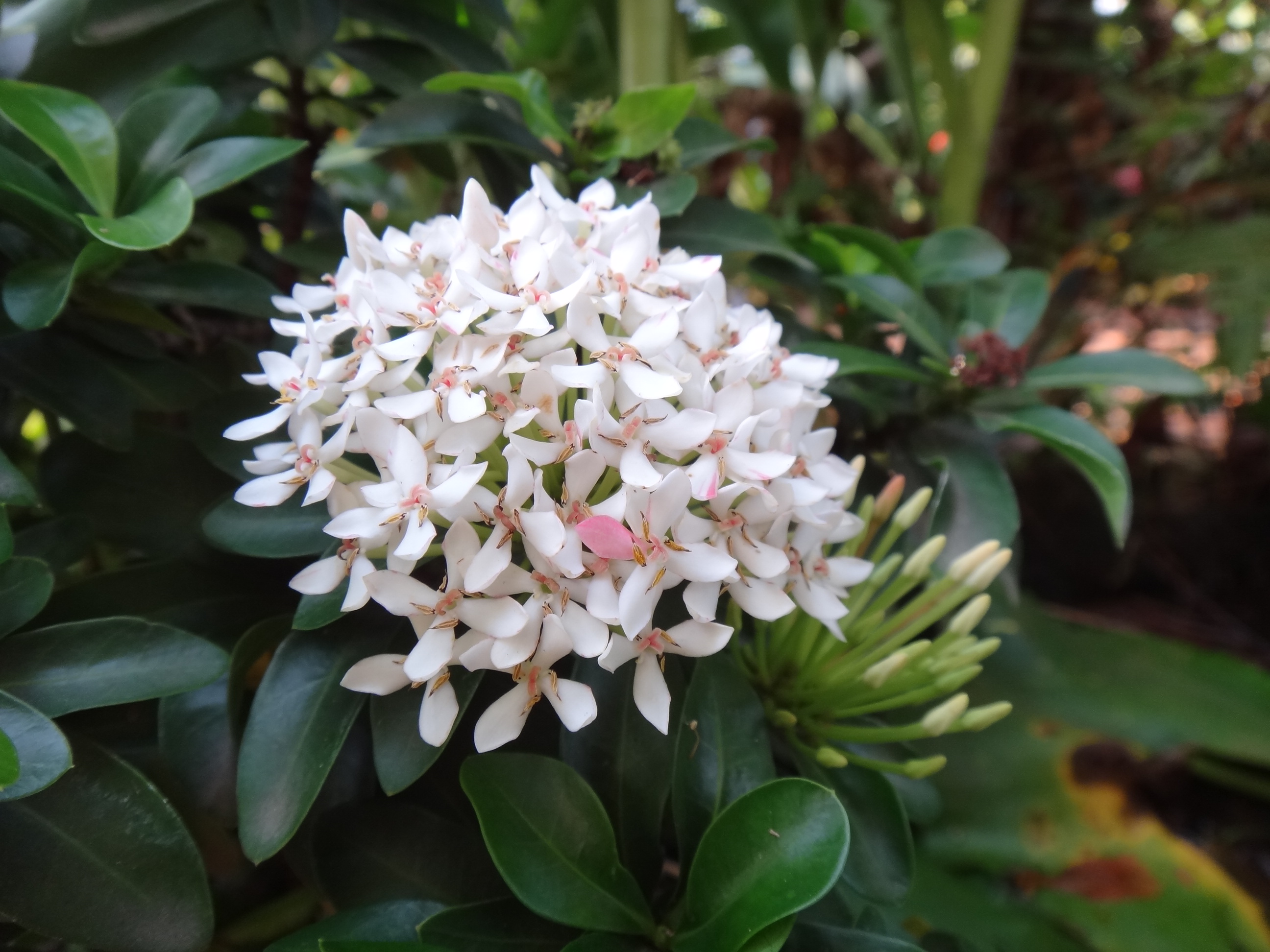
White Ixora

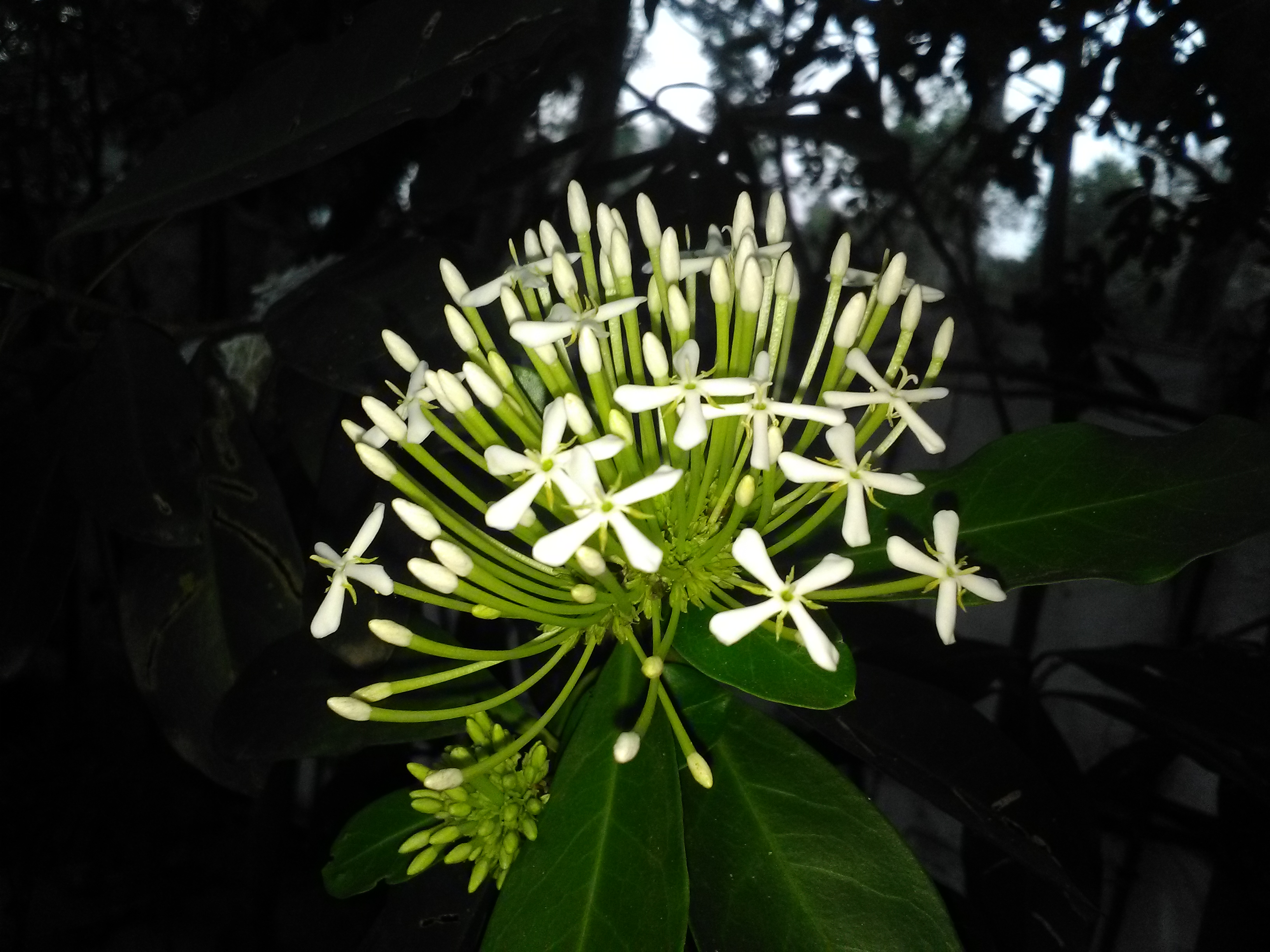
White Ixora

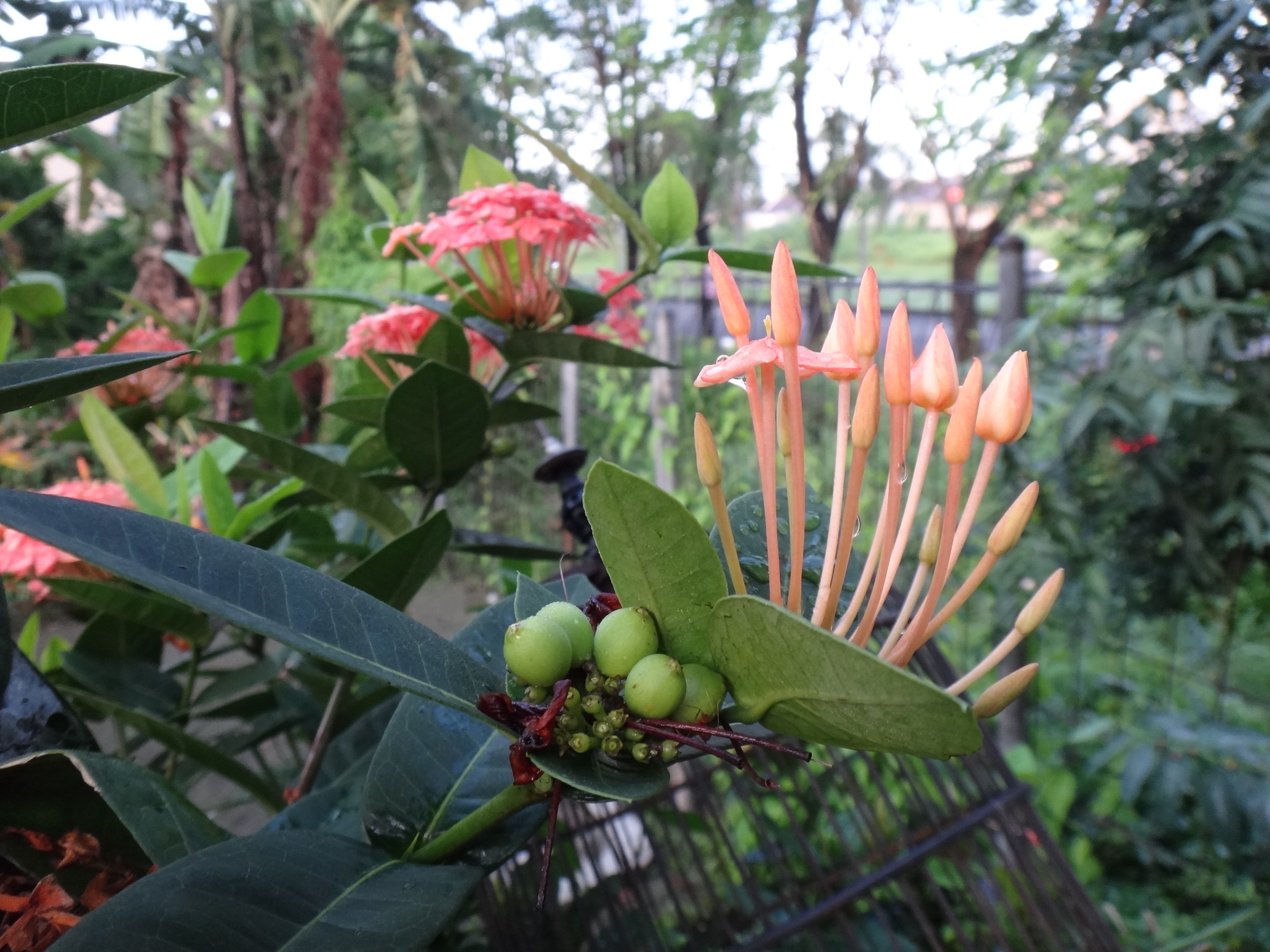
Young Ixora seeds

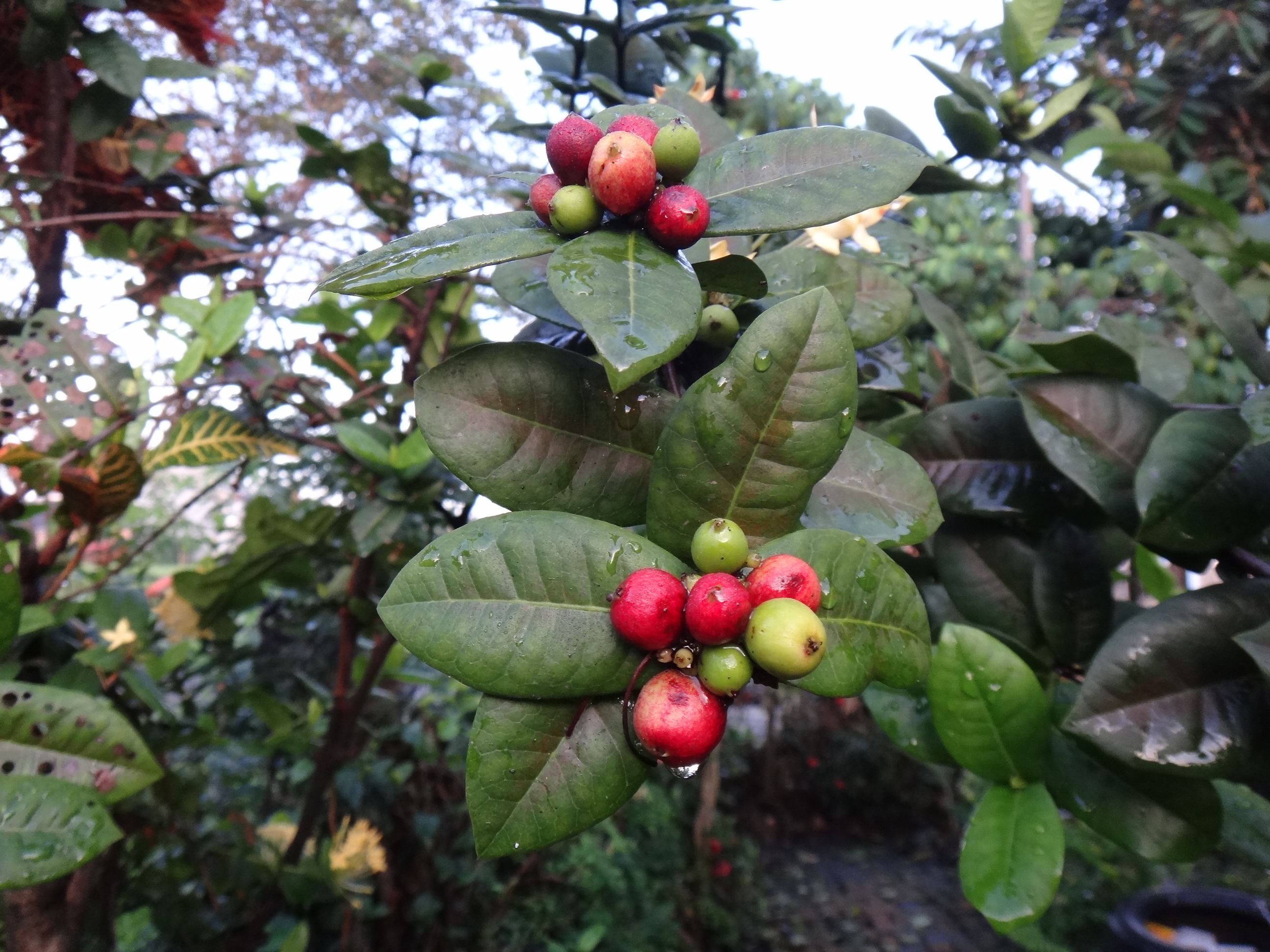
Ripe Ixora seeds (red ones)

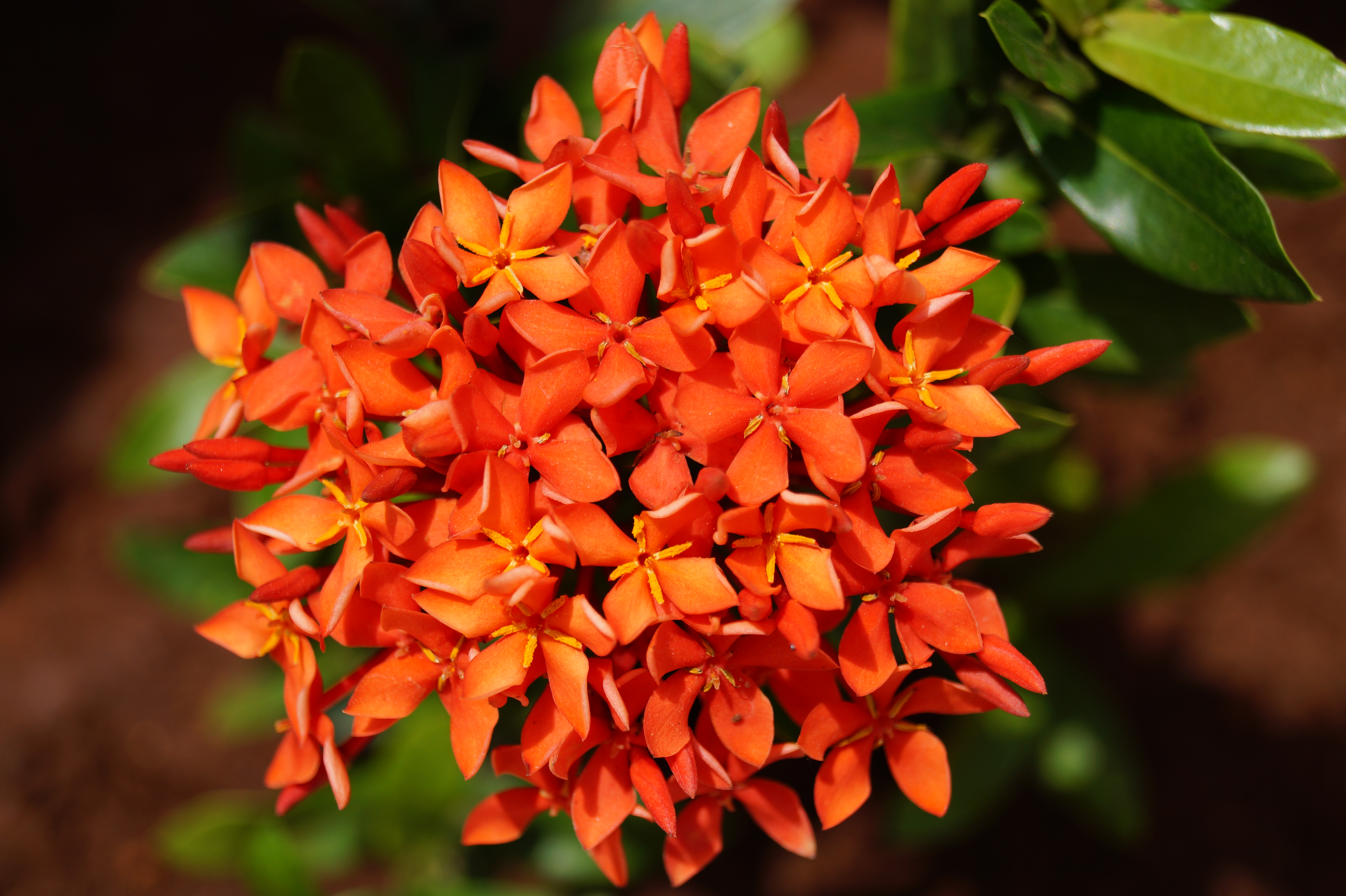
Red mini Ixora

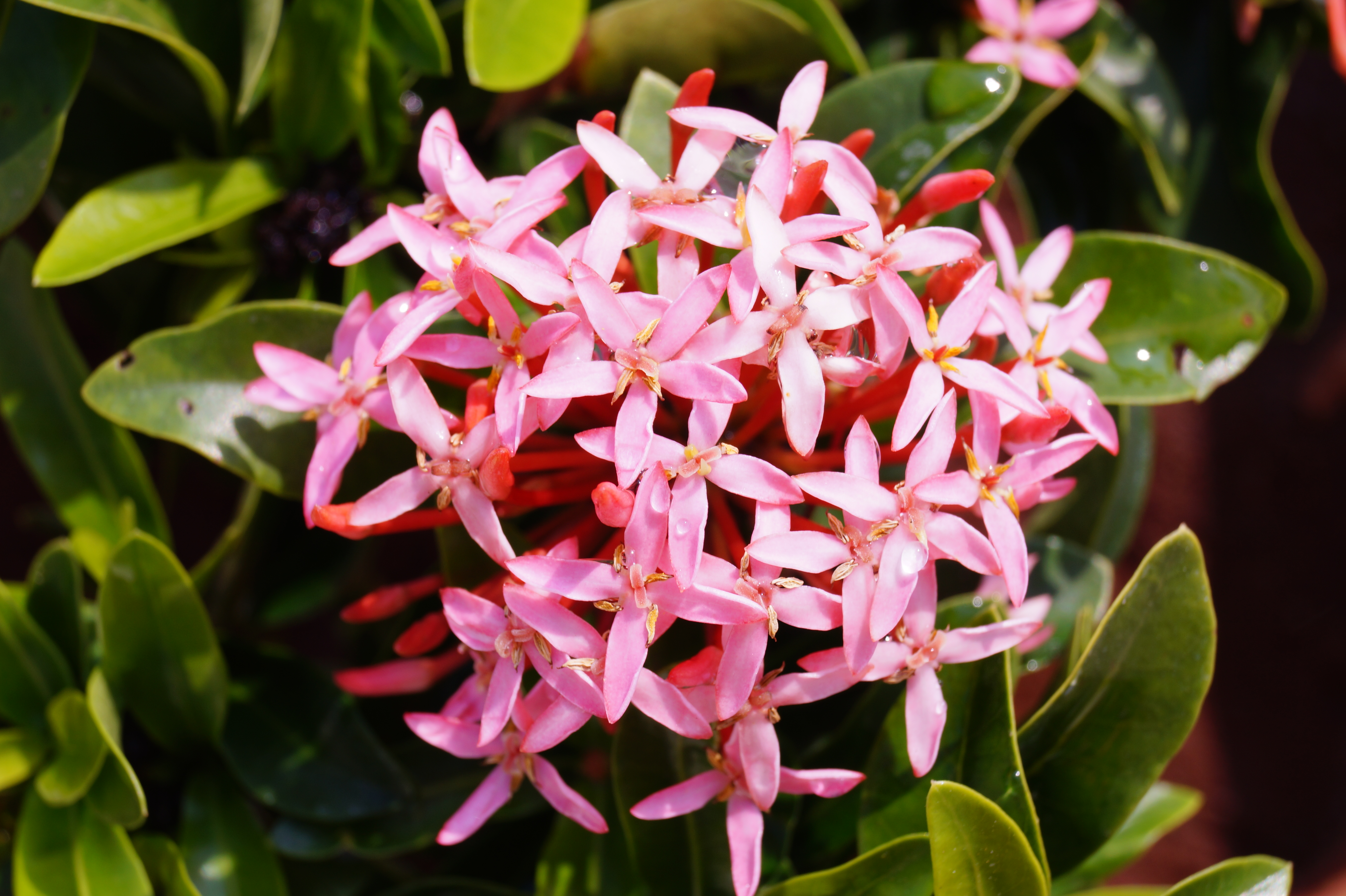
Pink mini ixora

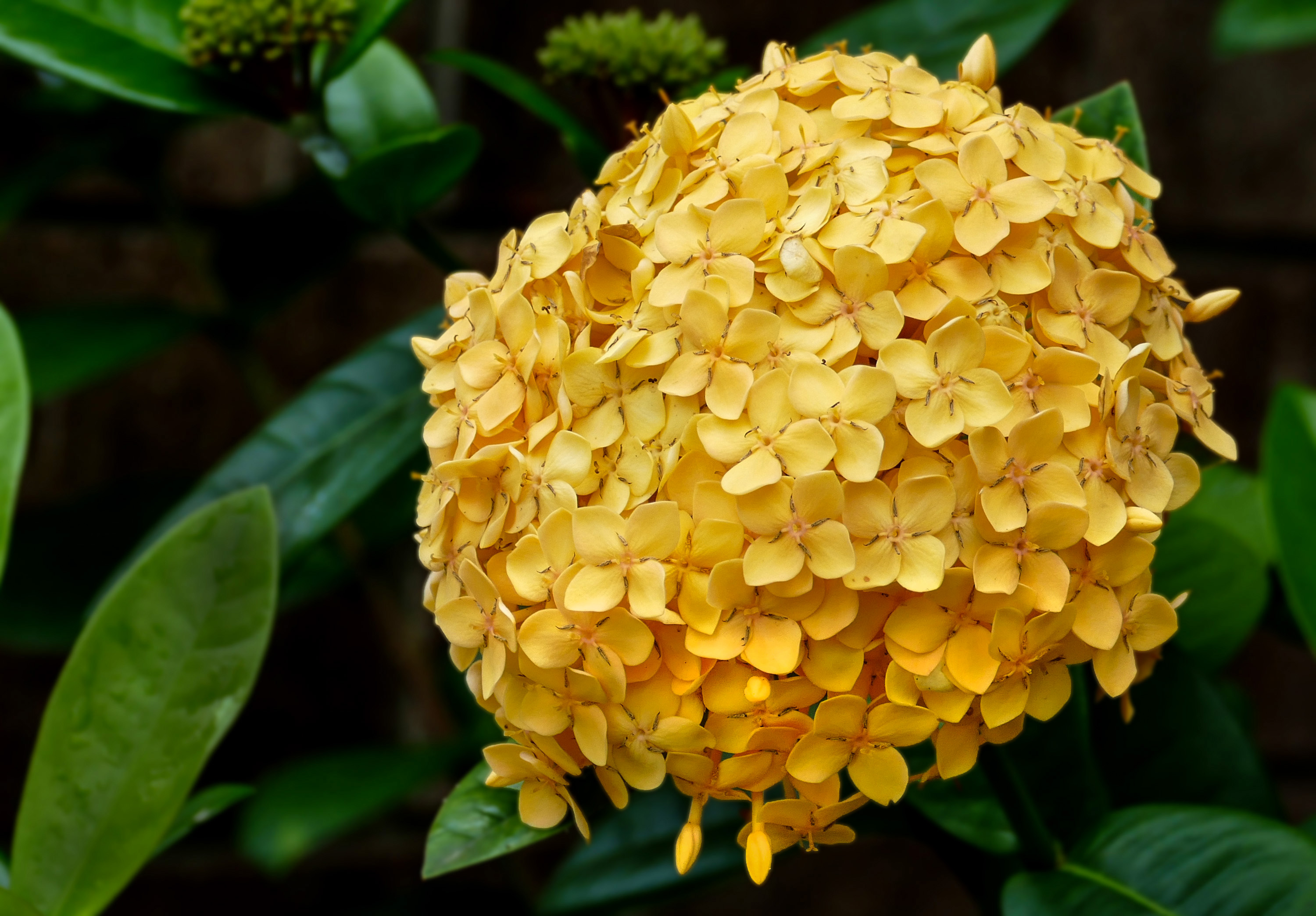
Ixora coccinea

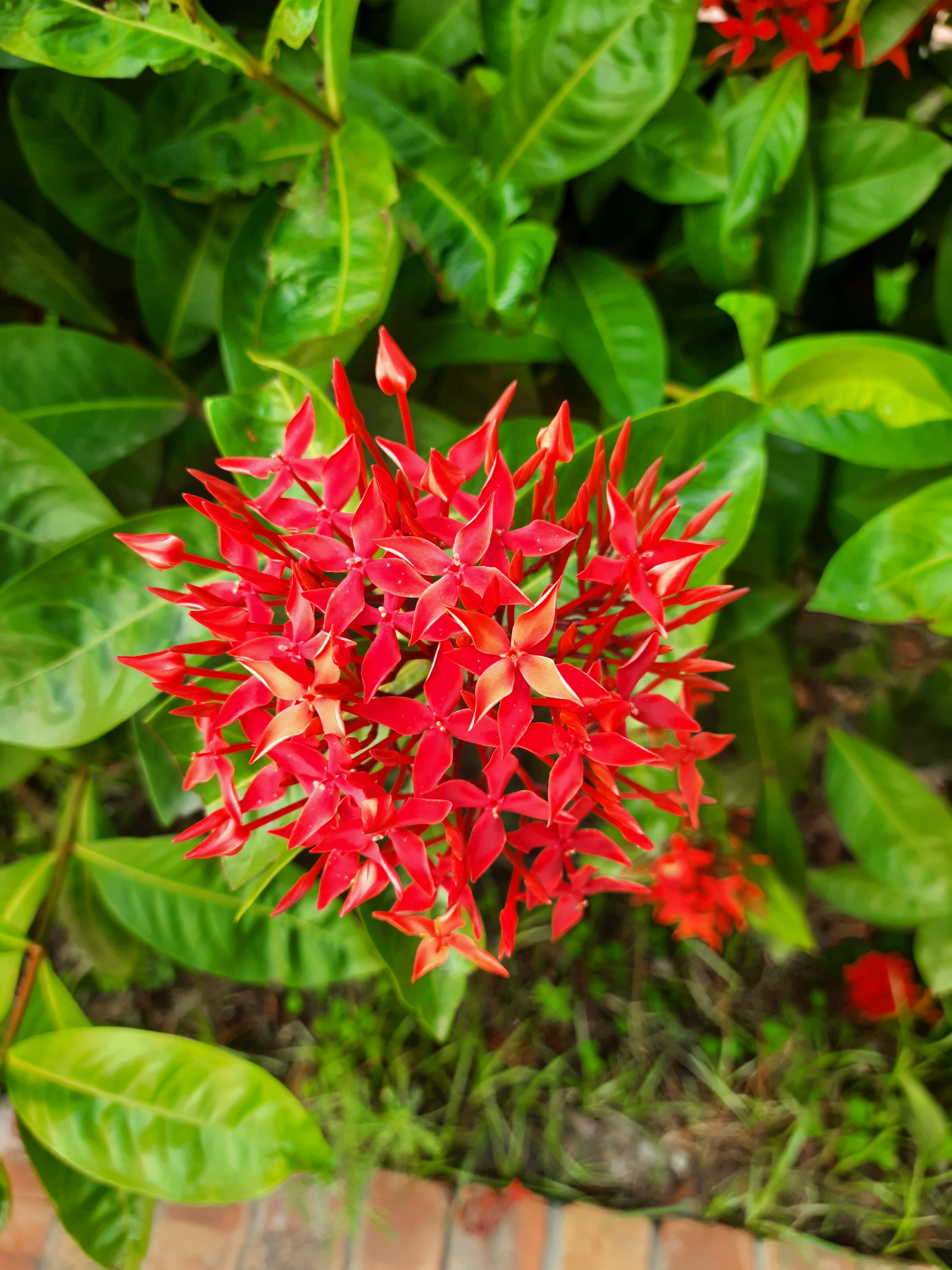
Ixora coccinea

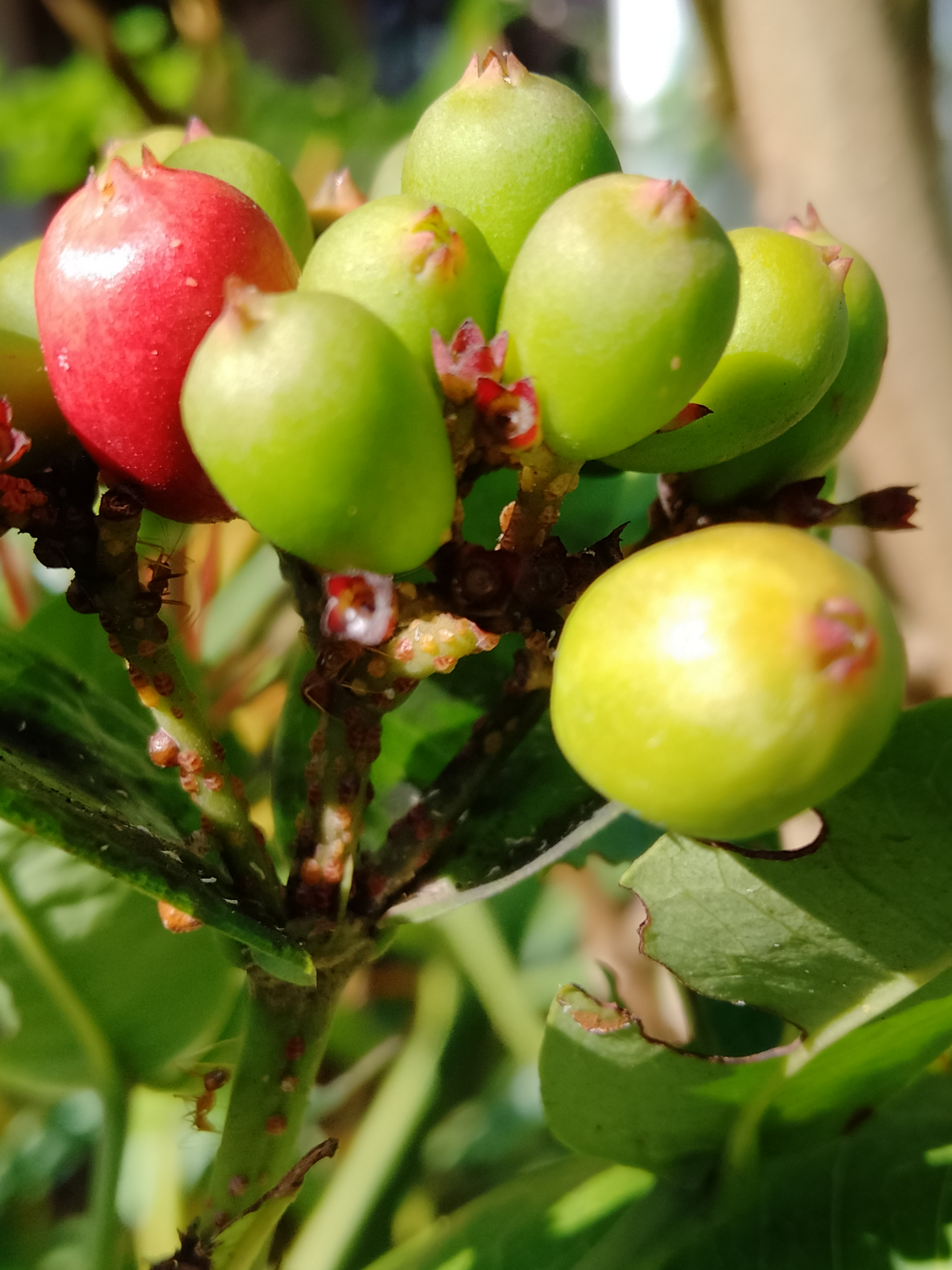
ixora_fruits
