= Ixora albersii =

Conservation status
- Vulnerable (IUCN 2.3)

Scientific classification
- Kingdom: Plantae
- Clade: Tracheophytes
- Clade: Angiosperms
- Clade: Eudicots
- Clade: Asterids
- Order: Gentianales
- Family: Rubiaceae
- Genus: Ixora
- Species: I. albersii

Binomial name
- Ixora albersii K.Schum.

Species of plant

Ixora albersii is a species of flowering plant in the family Rubiaceae. It is endemic to the West Usambara Mountains in Tanzania. The epithet albersii commemorates German botanist Eduard Albers.
