= William Bull (botanist) =

English botanist, nurseryman and plant collector

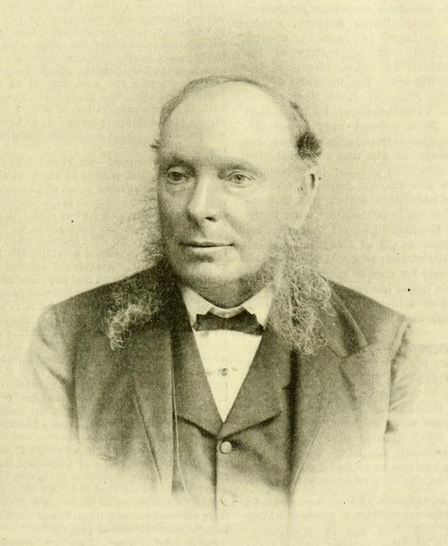
- Born: 1828; Winchester, England
- Died: 1 June 1902 (aged 73–74); Chelsea, England
- Citizenship: British
- Scientific career
- Fields: Botany, Horticulture

William Bull FLS VMH (1828–1902) was an English botanist, nurseryman and plant collector. He was born in Winchester and in 1861 purchased the nursery of John Weeks and Company in King's Road, Chelsea. He introduced into cultivation many plants from other countries, including orchids from Colombia and Liberia. John Carder and Edward Shuttleworth collected plants for William Bull.

The vast stock of the firm William Bull And Sons, headquartered at Kings Road, Chelsea, made it famous worldwide. When Ceylon was struck by a coffee-plant disease, Hemileia vastatrix, it was able to supply planters with a variety called Coffea liberica, which was immune to the disease. With the retirement of Edward Bull in 1916, by then the sole proprietor, the firm closed.

Bull was elected in 1866 a Fellow of the Linnean Society of London. In 1897 he received the Victoria Medal of Honour of the Royal Horticultural Society.
