= List of Ixora species =

The genus Ixora, family Rubiaceae, is one of the largest genera of flowering plants, and contains about 560 species distributed globally in the tropics and subtropics.

As of February 2025, Plants of the World Online accepts the following species:

== A ==
- Ixora accedens Valeton
- Ixora aciculiflora Bremek.
- Ixora acuminata Roxb.
- Ixora acuminatissima Müll.Arg.
- Ixora acuticauda Bremek.
- Ixora aegialodes Bremek.
- Ixora agasthyamalayana Sivad. & N.Mohanan
- Ixora aggregata Hutch.
- Ixora agostiniana Steyerm.
- Ixora akkeringae (Teijsm. & Binn.) Valeton ex Bremek.
- Ixora alba L.
- Ixora albersii K.Schum.
- Ixora alejandroi Banag & Tandang
- Ixora aluminicola Steyerm.
- Ixora amapaensis Steyerm.
- Ixora amherstiensis Bremek.
- Ixora amplexicaulis Gillespie
- Ixora amplexifolia K.Schum. & Lauterb.
- Ixora amplifolia A.Gray
- Ixora andina C.M.Taylor
- Ixora aneityensis Guillaumin
- Ixora anemodesma K.Schum.
- Ixora angustilimba Merr.
- Ixora aoupinieensis Hoang & Mouly
- Ixora araguaiensis Delprete
- Ixora archboldii Bremek.
- Ixora arestantha A.C.Sm.
- Ixora asme Guillaumin
- Ixora athroantha Bremek.
- Ixora auricularis Chun & How ex W.Ko
- Ixora auriculata Elmer
- Ixora aurorea Ridl.

== B ==
- Ixora backeri Bremek.
- Ixora bahiensis Benth.
- Ixora baileyana Bridson & L.G.Adams
- Ixora balansae Pit.
- Ixora baldwinii Keay
- Ixora balinensis Bremek.
- Ixora bancana Bremek.
- Ixora banjoana K.Krause
- Ixora barbata Roxb. ex Sm.
- Ixora barberae Bremek.
- Ixora bartlingii Elmer
- Ixora batesii Wernham
- Ixora batuensis Bremek.
- Ixora bauchiensis Hutch. & Dalziel
- Ixora beckleri Benth.
- Ixora bemangidiensis Guédès
- Ixora betongensis Craib
- Ixora bibracteata Elmer
- Ixora biflora Fosberg
- Ixora birmahica Bremek.
- Ixora blumei Zoll. & Moritzi
- Ixora borboniae Mouly & B.Bremer
- Ixora borneensis (Miq.) Boerl.
- Ixora bougainvilliae Bremek.
- Ixora brachiata Roxb.
- Ixora brachyanthera Bremek.
- Ixora brachycotyla Bremek.
- Ixora brachypoda DC.
- Ixora brachypogon Bremek.
- Ixora brachyura Bremek.
- Ixora bracteolaris Müll.Arg.
- Ixora bracteolata Craib
- Ixora brandisiana Kurz
- Ixora brassii S.Moore
- Ixora brevicaudata Bremek.
- Ixora brevifolia Benth.
- Ixora breviloba Bremek.
- Ixora brevipedunculata Fosberg
- Ixora brunnescens Kurz
- Ixora brunonis Wall. ex G.Don
- Ixora bullata Turrill
- Ixora burundiensis Bridson
- Ixora butterwickii Hole
- Ixora buxina Baill.

== C ==
- Ixora cabraliensis Di Maio & Peixoto
- Ixora calcicola A.C.Sm.
- Ixora calliantha Bremek.
- Ixora callithyrsa Bremek.
- Ixora calycina Thwaites
- Ixora cambodiana Pit.
- Ixora capillaris Bremek.
- Ixora capitulifera Merr.
- Ixora carewii Horne ex Baker
- Ixora casei Hance
- Ixora caudata Bremek.
- Ixora cauliflora Montrouz.
- Ixora celebica Ridl. ex Bremek.
- Ixora cephalophora Merr.
- Ixora ceramensis Bremek.
- Ixora chakrabortyi Murugan & S.Prabhu
- Ixora chartacea Elmer
- Ixora chinensis Lam.
- Ixora cibdela Craib
- Ixora cincta Bremek.
- Ixora clandestina De Block
- Ixora clarae Mouly & Pisivin
- Ixora clementium Bremek.
- Ixora clerodendron Ridl.
- Ixora coccinea L.
- Ixora coffeoides Valeton
- Ixora collina (Montrouz.) Beauvis.
- Ixora comptonii S.Moore
- Ixora concinna R.Br. ex Hook.f.
- Ixora conferta Valeton
- Ixora confertiflora Merr.
- Ixora confertior Bremek.
- Ixora congesta Roxb.
- Ixora congestiflora Delprete
- Ixora coralloraphis Bremek.
- Ixora cordata Merr. & L.M.Perry
- Ixora cordifolia Valeton
- Ixora coriifolia Bremek.
- Ixora coronata A.C.Sm.
- Ixora cowanii Bremek.
- Ixora crassifolia Merr.
- Ixora crassipes Boivin ex De Block
- Ixora cremixora Drake
- Ixora cumingiana S.Vidal
- Ixora cuneata W.Hunter
- Ixora cuneifolia Roxb.
- Ixora curtisii Ridl.
- Ixora cuspidata Ridl.

== D ==
- Ixora daemonia Bremek.
- Ixora davisii Sandwith
- Ixora decaryi De Block
- Ixora deciduiflora Bremek.
- Ixora decus-silvae Bremek.
- Ixora delicatula Keay
- Ixora deliensis Bremek.
- Ixora delpyana Pierre ex Pit.
- Ixora densiflora Müll.Arg.
- Ixora densithyrsa De Block
- Ixora diversifolia R.Br. ex Kurz
- Ixora djambica Bremek.
- Ixora dolichophylla K.Schum.
- Ixora dolichothyrsa Bremek.
- Ixora dongnaiensis Pierre ex Pit.
- Ixora doreensis (Scheff.) Valeton
- Ixora dorgelonis Bremek.
- Ixora duckei Standl.
- Ixora dzumacensis Guillaumin

== E ==
- Ixora ebracteolata Merr.
- Ixora effusa Chun & F.C.How
- Ixora elegans Gillespie
- Ixora elisae Mouly & Pisivin
- Ixora elongata B.Heyne ex G.Don
- Ixora eludens Bremek.
- Ixora emirnensis Baker
- Ixora emygdioi Di Maio & Peixoto
- Ixora endertii Bremek.
- Ixora engganensis Bremek.
- Ixora ensifolia Merr. & L.M.Perry
- Ixora eriantha A.Gray
- Ixora erythrocarpa K.Schum. & Lauterb.
- Ixora eugenioides Pierre ex Pit.
- Ixora euosmia K.Schum.

== F ==
- Ixora fallax Bremek.
- Ixora farinosa Bremek.
- Ixora faroensis Standl.
- Ixora fastigiata (R.D.Good) Bremek.
- Ixora ferrea (Jacq.) Benth.
- Ixora filiflora Bremek.
- Ixora filipendula Bremek.
- Ixora filipes Valeton
- Ixora filmeri Elmer
- Ixora finlaysoniana Wall. ex G.Don
- Ixora flagrans Bremek.
- Ixora flavescens Pierre ex Pit.
- Ixora floribunda (A.Rich.) Griseb.
- Ixora florida S.Moore
- Ixora foetida (L.f.) Fosberg
- Ixora foliicalyx Guédès
- Ixora foliosa Hiern
- Ixora forbesii Bremek.
- Ixora fragrans (Hook. & Arn.) A.Gray
- Ixora francavillana Müll.Arg.
- Ixora francii Schltr. & K.Krause
- Ixora froelichiana C.M.Taylor
- Ixora fucosa Bremek.
- Ixora fugiens Bremek.
- Ixora fulgida Ridl.
- Ixora fulviflora Bremek.
- Ixora funckii Wernham
- Ixora fusca E.T.Geddes
- Ixora fuscescens Valeton ex Merr.
- Ixora fuscovenosa De Block

== G ==
- Ixora gamblei V.S.Ramach. & V.J.Nair
- Ixora gardneriana Benth.
- Ixora gautieri De Block
- Ixora gibbsiae Bremek.
- Ixora gigantifolia Elmer
- Ixora glaucina (Teijsm. & Binn.) Kurz
- Ixora glomeruliflora Bremek.
- Ixora graciliflora Benth.
- Ixora grandifolia Zoll. & Moritzi
- Ixora granulata Bremek.
- Ixora grazielae Di Maio & Peixoto
- Ixora greenwoodiana A.C.Sm.
- Ixora griffithii Hook.
- Ixora guillenii C.M.Taylor
- Ixora guillotii Hochr.
- Ixora guineensis Benth.
- Ixora guluensis Valeton ex Merr.
- Ixora gyropogon Bremek.

== H ==
- Ixora hainanensis Merr.
- Ixora hajupensis Valeton
- Ixora hallieri Bremek.
- Ixora hartiana De Block
- Ixora harveyi (A.Gray) A.C.Sm.
- Ixora havilandii Ridl.
- Ixora hekouensis Tao Chen
- Ixora helwigii Bremek.
- Ixora henryi H.Lév.
- Ixora heterodoxa Müll.Arg.
- Ixora hiernii Scott Elliot
- Ixora himantophylla Bremek.
- Ixora hippoperifera Bremek.
- Ixora homolleae Govaerts ex De Block
- Ixora hookeri (Oudem.) Bremek.
- Ixora hymenophylla Bremek.

== I ==
- Ixora imitans Bremek.
- Ixora inaequifolia C.B.Rob.
- Ixora inexpecta Bremek.
- Ixora insularum Bremek.
- Ixora intensa K.Krause
- Ixora intermedia Elmer
- Ixora intropilosa Steyerm.
- Ixora inundata Hiern
- Ixora irwinii Delprete
- Ixora iteaphylla Bremek.
- Ixora iteoidea Bremek.
- Ixora ixoroides (Guillaumin) Mouly & B.Bremer

== J ==
- Ixora jacobsonii Bremek.
- Ixora jaherii Bremek.
- Ixora javanica (Blume) DC.
- Ixora johnsonii Hook.f.
- Ixora jourdanii Mouly & J.Florence
- Ixora jucunda Thwaites
- Ixora junghuhnii Bremek.

== K ==
- Ixora kachinensis Deb & Rout
- Ixora kalehensis De Block
- Ixora kaniensis Valeton
- Ixora karimatica Bremek.
- Ixora kavalliana K.Schum.
- Ixora keenanii Deb & Rout
- Ixora keithii Ridl.
- Ixora kerrii Craib
- Ixora kerstingii K.Schum. & Lauterb.
- Ixora keyensis Warb.
- Ixora killipii Standl.
- Ixora kinabaluensis Stapf
- Ixora kingdon-wardii Bremek.
- Ixora kingstoni Hook.f.
- Ixora kjellbergii Bremek.
- Ixora knappiae C.M.Taylor
- Ixora koordersii (Ridl.) Bremek.
- Ixora korthalsiana Kurz
- Ixora krewanhensis Pierre ex Pit.
- Ixora kuakuensis S.Moore
- Ixora kurziana (Teijsm. & Binn.) Kurz

== L ==
- Ixora labuanensis Bremek.
- Ixora lacei Bremek.
- Ixora lacuum Bremek.
- Ixora lagenifructa De Block
- Ixora lakshnakarae Craib
- Ixora lancisepala Ridl.
- Ixora laotica Pit.
- Ixora laurentii De Wild.
- Ixora lavanya J.Mathew & P.M.Salim
- Ixora lawsonii Gamble
- Ixora laxiflora Sm.
- Ixora lebangharae Bremek.
- Ixora lecardii Guillaumin
- Ixora ledermannii K.Krause
- Ixora leptopus Valeton
- Ixora letestui Pellegr.
- Ixora leucocarpa Elmer
- Ixora leytensis Elmer
- Ixora liberiensis De Block
- Ixora linggensis Bremek.
- Ixora lobbii J.Veitch & J.Veitch f.
- Ixora loerzingii Bremek.
- Ixora longibracteata Bremek.
- Ixora longifolia Sm.
- Ixora longiloba Guillaumin
- Ixora longipedicellata De Block
- Ixora longipedunculata De Wild.
- Ixora longipes (DC.) Zoll. & Moritzi
- Ixora longistipula Merr.
- Ixora longshanensis Tao Chen
- Ixora lucida R.Br. ex Hook.f.
- Ixora lunutica C.E.C.Fisch.
- Ixora luzoniensis Merr.

== M ==
- Ixora macgregorii C.B.Rob.
- Ixora macilenta De Block
- Ixora macrantha (Steud.) Bremek.
- Ixora macrocotyla Bremek.
- Ixora macrophylla Bartl. ex DC.
- Ixora macrothyrsa (Teijsm. & Binn.) N.E.Br.
- Ixora magnifica Elmer
- Ixora makassarica Bremek.
- Ixora malabarica (Dennst.) Mabb.
- Ixora malaica W.Hunter
- Ixora malayana Bremek.
- Ixora mandalayensis Bremek.
- Ixora mangabensis Aug.DC.
- Ixora mangoliensis Bremek.
- Ixora margaretae (N.Hallé) Mouly & B.Bremer
- Ixora marquesensis F.Br.
- Ixora marsdenii Ridl.
- Ixora martinsii Standl.
- Ixora masoalensis De Block
- Ixora mattogrossensis (Standl.) C.M.Taylor
- Ixora maxima Seem.
- Ixora maymyensis Bremek.
- Ixora mearnsii Merr.
- Ixora meeboldii Craib
- Ixora megalophylla Chamch.
- Ixora megalothyrsa Bremek.
- Ixora mekongensis Pit.
- Ixora membranifolia Valeton ex Merr.
- Ixora mentangis Bremek.
- Ixora merguensis Hook.f.
- Ixora microphylla Drake
- Ixora mildbraedii K.Krause
- Ixora miliensis Bremek.
- Ixora minahassae Bremek.
- Ixora mindanaensis Merr.
- Ixora minor (Valeton) Mouly & B.Bremer
- Ixora minutiflora Hiern
- Ixora miquelii Bremek.
- Ixora mirabilis Bremek.
- Ixora mjoebergii Merr.
- Ixora mocquerysii Aug.DC.
- Ixora mollirama Bremek.
- Ixora moluccana Bremek.
- Ixora mooreensis (Nadeaud) Fosberg
- Ixora moskovitsiana C.M.Taylor
- Ixora moszkowskii Bremek.
- Ixora motleyi Bremek.
- Ixora mucronata Warb.
- Ixora muelleri Bremek.
- Ixora myitkyinensis Bremek.
- Ixora myrsinoides A.C.Sm.
- Ixora myrtifolia A.C.Sm.

== N ==
- Ixora namatanaica Bremek.
- Ixora nana Robbr. & Lejoly
- Ixora nandarivatensis Gillespie
- Ixora narcissodora K.Schum.
- Ixora natunensis Bremek.
- Ixora nematopoda K.Schum.
- Ixora neocaledonica Hochr.
- Ixora neriifolia Jack
- Ixora nicaraguensis Wernham
- Ixora nicobarica Bremek.
- Ixora nienkui Merr. & Chun
- Ixora nigerica Keay
- Ixora nigricans R.Br. ex Wight & Arn.
- Ixora nimbana Schnell
- Ixora nitens (Poir.) Mouly & B.Bremer
- Ixora nitidula Bremek.
- Ixora nonantha Bremek.
- Ixora notoniana Wall. ex G.Don
- Ixora novemnervia Lour.
- Ixora novoguineensis Mouly & B.Bremer

== O ==
- Ixora obtusiloba Bremek.
- Ixora odoratiflora Valeton
- Ixora oligantha Schltr. & K.Krause
- Ixora ooumuensis J.Florence
- Ixora oreogena S.T.Reynolds & P.I.Forst.
- Ixora oresitropha Bremek.
- Ixora orohenensis Nadeaud
- Ixora orophila Bremek.
- Ixora orovilleae Bremek.
- Ixora otophora Bremek.
- Ixora ovalifolia Bremek.

== P ==
- Ixora palawanensis Merr.
- Ixora palembangensis Bremek.
- Ixora pallens De Block
- Ixora paludosa (Blume) Kurz
- Ixora panurensis Müll.Arg.
- Ixora paradoxalis Bremek.
- Ixora paraopaca W.C.Ko
- Ixora parkeri Bremek.
- Ixora parviflora Lam.
- Ixora patens Ridl.
- Ixora patula Bremek.
- Ixora pauciflora DC.
- Ixora pauper Valeton
- Ixora pavetta Andrews
- Ixora peculiaris De Block
- Ixora pedalis De Block
- Ixora pedionoma A.C.Sm.
- Ixora pelagica Seem.
- Ixora pendula Jack
- Ixora peruviana (Spruce ex K.Schum.) Standl.
- Ixora phellopus K.Schum.
- Ixora philippinensis Merr.
- Ixora phulangkaensis Chamch.
- Ixora phuluangensis Chamch.
- Ixora pierrei Merr.
- Ixora pilosa Merr.
- Ixora pilosostyla Di Maio & Peixoto
- Ixora piresii Steyerm.
- Ixora platythyrsa Baker
- Ixora polita (Miq.) Boerl.
- Ixora polyantha Wight
- Ixora polycephala Bremek.
- Ixora potaroensis Steyerm.
- Ixora pradeepii Balan & S.Harikr.
- Ixora praestans Bremek.
- Ixora praetermissa De Block
- Ixora princeps G.Nicholson
- Ixora prolixa A.C.Sm.
- Ixora pseudoacuminata Deb & Rout
- Ixora pseudoamboinica (Korth.) Kuntze
- Ixora pseudojavanica Bremek.
- Ixora pubescens Willd.
- Ixora pubiflora DC.
- Ixora pubifolia A.C.Sm.
- Ixora pubigera Pit.
- Ixora pubirama Bremek.
- Ixora pudica Baker
- Ixora pueuana Govaerts
- Ixora pyrantha Bremek.
- Ixora pyrrhostaura Bremek.

== Q ==
- Ixora quadrilocularis De Block

== R ==
- Ixora raiateensis J.W.Moore
- Ixora raivavaensis Fosberg
- Ixora rakotonasoloi De Block
- Ixora rangonensis Bremek.
- Ixora ravikumarii Kottaim.
- Ixora recurva (Roxb.) Kurz
- Ixora reducta Drake ex Guédès
- Ixora reticulata (Blume) Boerl.
- Ixora reynaldoi Banag
- Ixora rhododactyla Bremek.
- Ixora richardi-longii Govaerts
- Ixora richardiana Müll.Arg.
- Ixora ridsdalei Mouly & B.Bremer
- Ixora riparum K.Krause
- Ixora ripicola De Block
- Ixora rivalis Valeton
- Ixora robinsonii Ridl.
- Ixora roemeri Bremek.
- Ixora romburghii Bremek.
- Ixora rosacea Perr.
- Ixora roseituba Bremek.
- Ixora roxburghii Kuntze
- Ixora rubrinervis Bremek.
- Ixora rudasiana C.M.Taylor
- Ixora rudgeoides C.M.Taylor
- Ixora rufa Müll.Arg.
- Ixora rugosirama Bremek.
- Ixora rugulosa Wall. ex Kurz
- Ixora ruttenii Bremek.

== S ==
- Ixora sabangensis Bremek.
- Ixora salicifolia (Blume) DC.
- Ixora salwenensis Bremek.
- Ixora sambiranensis Homolle ex Guédès
- Ixora samoensis A.Gray
- Ixora sandwithiana Steyerm.
- Ixora scandens Bremek.
- Ixora scheffleri K.Schum. & K.Krause
- Ixora schlechteri Bremek.
- Ixora schomburgkiana Benth.
- Ixora schunkeana C.M.Taylor
- Ixora scortechinii King & Gamble
- Ixora seretii De Wild.
- Ixora sessililimba Merr.
- Ixora setchellii Fosberg
- Ixora siamensis Wall. ex G.Don
- Ixora siantanensis Bremek.
- Ixora silagoensis Manalastas, Banag & Alejandro
- Ixora simalurensis Bremek.
- Ixora siphonantha Oliv.
- Ixora smeruensis Bremek.
- Ixora smithiana C.M.Taylor
- Ixora solomonensis (Ridsdale) Mouly & B.Bremer
- Ixora solomonensium Bremek.
- Ixora somosomaensis Gillespie
- Ixora sparsiflora Elmer
- Ixora sparsifolia K.Krause
- Ixora spathoidea F.Br.
- Ixora spectabilis Wall. ex G.Don
- Ixora spirei Pit.
- Ixora st-johnii Fosberg
- Ixora standleyana C.M.Taylor
- Ixora steenisii Bremek.
- Ixora stenophylla (Korth.) Kuntze
- Ixora stenothyrsa Bremek.
- Ixora stenura Bremek.
- Ixora stipulata (Vell.) Müll.Arg.
- Ixora stokesii F.Br.
- Ixora storckii Seem.
- Ixora subauriculata Bremek.
- Ixora subsessilis Wall. ex G.Don
- Ixora sulaensis Bremek.
- Ixora sumbawensis Bremek.
- Ixora symphorantha Bremek.
- Ixora synactica De Block
- Ixora syringiflora (Schltdl.) Müll.Arg.

== T ==
- Ixora tahuataensis Mouly & J.Florence
- Ixora talaudensis Bremek.
- Ixora tanzaniensis Bridson
- Ixora tavoyana Bremek.
- Ixora temehaniensis J.W.Moore
- Ixora temptans Bremek.
- Ixora tenelliflora Merr.
- Ixora tengerensis Bremek.
- Ixora tenuiflora Roxb.
- Ixora tenuis De Block
- Ixora thwaitesii Hook.f.
- Ixora tibetana Bremek.
- Ixora tidorensis (Miq.) Bremek.
- Ixora tigriomustax Bremek.
- Ixora timorensis Decne.
- Ixora treubii Bremek.
- Ixora triantha Volkens
- Ixora trichandra Bremek.
- Ixora trichobotrys Merr.
- Ixora trichocalyx Hochr.
- Ixora trilocularis (Balf.f.) Mouly & B.Bremer
- Ixora trimera Guédès
- Ixora tsangii Merr. ex H.L.Li
- Ixora tubiflora A.C.Sm.
- Ixora tunicata Bremek.

== U ==
- Ixora uahukaensis Lorence & W.L.Wagner
- Ixora uapouensis Lorence & W.L.Wagner
- Ixora umbellata Valeton
- Ixora umbricola Bremek.
- Ixora undulata Roxb. ex Sm.
- Ixora urophylla Bremek.

== V ==
- Ixora valetoniana Mouly & B.Bremer
- Ixora vandersticheleorum Govaerts
- Ixora vasquezii C.M.Taylor
- Ixora vaughanii (Verdc.) Mouly & B.Bremer
- Ixora venezuelica Steyerm.
- Ixora venulosa Benth.
- Ixora versteegii Bremek.
- Ixora verticillata (Vell.) Müll.Arg.
- Ixora vieillardii Guillaumin
- Ixora vinniei Govaerts
- Ixora violacea Lour.
- Ixora vitiensis A.Gray

== W ==
- Ixora whitei S.Moore
- Ixora winkleri Bremek.
- Ixora woodii Bremek.

== Y ==
- Ixora yaouhensis Schltr.
- Ixora yavitensis Steyerm.
- Ixora ysabellae Bremek.
- Ixora yunckeri A.C.Sm.
- Ixora yunnanensis Hutch.

== Z ==
- Ixora zollingeriana Bremek.
