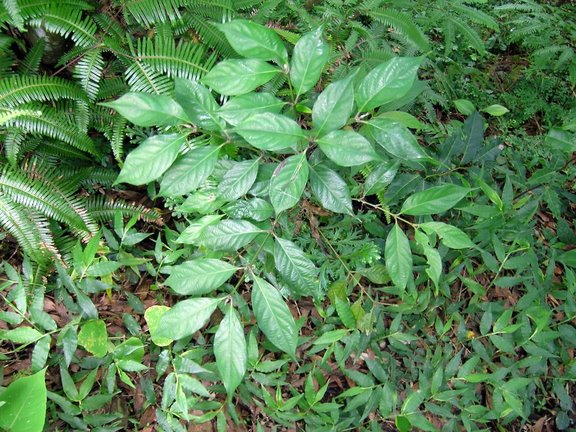
- Lasianthus fordii

Scientific classification
- Kingdom: Plantae
- Clade: Tracheophytes
- Clade: Angiosperms
- Clade: Eudicots
- Clade: Asterids
- Order: Gentianales
- Family: Rubiaceae
- Subfamily: Rubioideae
- Tribe: Lasiantheae
- Genus: Lasianthus; Jack

Type species
- Lasianthus cyanocarpus Jack

Species
- About 300 species. See text.

Synonyms
- Dasus Lour. nom. rej.; Dressleriopsis Dwyer; Litosanthes Blume; Mephitidia Reinw. ex Blume; Octavia DC.; Santia Wight & Arn., nom. illeg.

= Lasianthus =

Genus of flowering plants

Lasianthus is a genus of flowering plants in the family Rubiaceae. They are tropical subshrubs, shrubs, or rarely, small trees. They inhabit the understory of primary forests.

Lasianthus has about 300 species. The type species for the genus is Lasianthus cyanocarpus. In 2012, a revision of Lasianthus in Malesia described 131 species. Another 30 or so species grow elsewhere in tropical Asia. Most of these are described in Flora of China or in A Revised Handbook to the Flora of Ceylon. 14 or 15 species are native to the Western Ghats of southwestern India, including the endemic Lasianthus agasthyamalayanus. Fifteen species or perhaps as many as 20 species are known from tropical Africa. Two species (Lasianthus panamensis and Lasianthus lanceolatus), or possibly three, are native to the neotropics. The Australian Ixora baileyana had at one time been placed in Lasianthus as Lasianthus graciliflorus.

Dried specimens of Lasianthus often shed their flowers and fruit. For this reason, misidentification is common, even in herbaria.

== Species ==
As of May 2025, Plants of the World Online accepts the following 292 species:

- Lasianthus acuminatissimus Merr.
- Lasianthus acuminatus Wight
- Lasianthus acutatus Miq.
- Lasianthus africanus Hiern
- Lasianthus agasthyamalayanus R.Jagad., S.P.Mathew, Gangapr. & E.S.S.Kumar
- Lasianthus angustifolius King & Gamble
- Lasianthus annamicus Pit.
- Lasianthus apiocarpus Miq.
- Lasianthus appressus Hook.f.
- Lasianthus aristatus Craib
- Lasianthus atroneurus H.Zhu
- Lasianthus attenuatus Jack
- Lasianthus austrosinensis H.S.Lo
- Lasianthus austroyunnanensis H.Zhu
- Lasianthus baasianus H.Zhu
- Lasianthus bachmaensis V.S.Dang & Naiki
- Lasianthus bahorucanus Zanoni
- Lasianthus barbatus H.Zhu
- Lasianthus barbiger Ridl.
- Lasianthus batangensis K.Schum.
- Lasianthus bicolor Craib
- Lasianthus bidoupensis V.S.Dang & Naiki
- Lasianthus biermannii King ex Hook.f.
- Lasianthus bifloroideus H.Zhu
- Lasianthus biflorus (Blume) M.Gangop. & Chakrab.
- Lasianthus blumeanus Wight
- Lasianthus bokorensis Naiki
- Lasianthus bolavenensis Tagane & Soulad.
- Lasianthus borneensis Merr.
- Lasianthus bracteolatus Miq.
- Lasianthus brevipedicellatus H.Zhu
- Lasianthus brevipedunculatus H.Zhu
- Lasianthus brochidodromus H.Zhu
- Lasianthus bruneensis H.Zhu
- Lasianthus burmanicus M.Gangop. & Chakrab.
- Lasianthus caeruleus Pit.
- Lasianthus cailinianus H.Zhu
- Lasianthus calycinus Dunn
- Lasianthus cambodianus Pit.
- Lasianthus camlamensis V.S.Dang & Naiki
- Lasianthus candidus V.S.Dang, Naiki & Yahara
- Lasianthus capitatus Blume
- Lasianthus capitulatus Wight
- Lasianthus cereiflorus E.A.Bruce
- Lasianthus chartaceus Craib
- Lasianthus chevalieri Pit.
- Lasianthus chii V.S.Dang & Naiki
- Lasianthus chinensis (Champ.) Benth.
- Lasianthus chlorocarpus K.Schum.
- Lasianthus chowdheryi Karthig., Jayanthi & Sumathi
- Lasianthus chryseus Ridl.
- Lasianthus chrysocaulis Ridsdale
- Lasianthus chrysoneurus (Korth.) Miq.
- Lasianthus chrysophyllus Miq.
- Lasianthus chrysotrichus Lauterb.
- Lasianthus chunii H.S.Lo
- Lasianthus ciliatus Wight
- Lasianthus cinereus Gamble
- Lasianthus clementis Merr.
- Lasianthus coffeoides Fyson
- Lasianthus congesticymus H.Zhu
- Lasianthus conspicuus Ridl.
- Lasianthus constrictus Wight
- Lasianthus cordatus Merr.
- Lasianthus coriaceifolius H.Zhu
- Lasianthus coronatus King & Gamble
- Lasianthus crassinervis Ridl.
- Lasianthus crinitus Hook.f.
- Lasianthus curtisii King & Gamble
- Lasianthus cyanocarpoides Valeton
- Lasianthus cyanocarpus Jack
- Lasianthus dakgleiensis V.S.Dang, Naiki & Tagane
- Lasianthus dalatensis Wernham
- Lasianthus depressineurus H.Zhu
- Lasianthus dichotomus Wight
- Lasianthus dienkhanhensis V.S.Dang & Naiki
- Lasianthus dinghouanus H.Zhu
- Lasianthus eberhardtii Pit.
- Lasianthus elevatineurus H.Zhu
- Lasianthus ellipsoideus H.Zhu
- Lasianthus ellipticus Wight
- Lasianthus eriocalyx H.Zhu
- Lasianthus euneurus Stapf
- Lasianthus fansipanensis V.S.Dang & Naiki
- Lasianthus fasciculus H.Zhu
- Lasianthus ferrugineus King & Gamble
- Lasianthus filiformis King & Gamble
- Lasianthus filipedunculatus H.Zhu
- Lasianthus filipes Chun ex H.S.Lo
- Lasianthus flavihirtus H.Zhu
- Lasianthus flavinervius Ridl.
- Lasianthus floresensis H.Zhu
- Lasianthus foetidissimus A.Chev. ex Pit.
- Lasianthus foetulentus Ridsdale
- Lasianthus fordii Hance
- Lasianthus formosensis Matsum.
- Lasianthus foxworthyanus Craib
- Lasianthus furcatoides H.Zhu
- Lasianthus gardneri (Thwaites) Hook.f.
- Lasianthus gialaiensis V.S.Dang, Vuong, Quan & Naiki
- Lasianthus giganteus Naiki
- Lasianthus glaber Ridl.
- Lasianthus globularis V.S.Dang & Naiki
- Lasianthus glomeruliflorus K.Schum.
- Lasianthus griffithii Wight
- Lasianthus halconensis Arshed & Alejandro
- Lasianthus harmandianus Pierre ex Pit.
- Lasianthus harveyanus King & Gamble
- Lasianthus hatinhensis V.S.Dang, Naiki & Yahara
- Lasianthus helferi Hook.f.
- Lasianthus henryi Hutch.
- Lasianthus hexander Blume
- Lasianthus hirsutisepalus H.Zhu
- Lasianthus hirsutus (Roxb.) Merr.
- Lasianthus hirtimarginatus H.Zhu
- Lasianthus hirtus Ridl.
- Lasianthus hispidulus (Drake) Pit.
- Lasianthus honbaensis V.S.Dang, Tagane & H.Toyama
- Lasianthus hongiaoensis V.S.Dang & Naiki
- Lasianthus hookeri C.B.Clarke ex Hook.f.
- Lasianthus inodorus Blume
- Lasianthus iteoides Valeton ex H.Zhu
- Lasianthus iteophyllus Miq.
- Lasianthus jackianus Wight
- Lasianthus jangarunii Y.W.Low
- Lasianthus japonicus Miq.
- Lasianthus kailarsenii Poopath, S.Vajrodaya & Napiroon
- Lasianthus kbangensis V.S.Dang, Vuong & Naiki
- Lasianthus khanhhoaensis V.S.Dang & Naiki
- Lasianthus khanhvinhensis V.S.Dang & Naiki
- Lasianthus kilimandscharicus K.Schum.
- Lasianthus kinabaluensis Stapf
- Lasianthus konchurangensis V.S.Dang, T.B.Tran & Ha
- Lasianthus kontumensis V.S.Dang, Naiki & Tagane
- Lasianthus krabiensis Napiroon, Balslev & Chamch.
- Lasianthus lacduongensis V.S.Dang & Naiki
- Lasianthus laevigatus Blume
- Lasianthus lamdongensis V.S.Dang, Naiki & Toyama
- Lasianthus lanceolatus (Griseb.) Urb.
- Lasianthus lancifolius Hook.f.
- Lasianthus lancilobus H.Zhu
- Lasianthus laoticus Tagane, Soulad. & Nob.Tanaka
- Lasianthus larsenii H.Zhu
- Lasianthus latifolius (Blume ex DC.) Miq.
- Lasianthus laxifloroideus H.Zhu
- Lasianthus laxiflorus Merr.
- Lasianthus laxinervis (Verdc.) Jannerup
- Lasianthus lecomtei Pit.
- Lasianthus ledermannii Valeton
- Lasianthus linearifolius H.Zhu
- Lasianthus linearisepalus C.Y.Wu & H.Zhu
- Lasianthus lineolatus Craib
- Lasianthus loeiensis H.Zhu
- Lasianthus longibracteatus H.Zhu
- Lasianthus longifolius Wight
- Lasianthus longipedunculatus R.Parker
- Lasianthus longissimus H.Zhu
- Lasianthus lucidus Blume
- Lasianthus macrobracteatus Rugayah & Sunarti
- Lasianthus macrocalyx K.Schum.
- Lasianthus maculatus Craib
- Lasianthus malaccensis King & Gamble
- Lasianthus malaiensis H.Zhu
- Lasianthus marginatus Craib
- Lasianthus meeboldii Deb & M.G.Gangop.
- Lasianthus megaphyllus H.Zhu
- Lasianthus membranaceoideus H.Zhu
- Lasianthus membranaceus Stapf
- Lasianthus micranthus Hook.f.
- Lasianthus microcalyx K.Schum.
- Lasianthus minutiflorus H.Zhu
- Lasianthus mollis Ridl.
- Lasianthus montanus King & Gamble
- Lasianthus moonii Wight
- Lasianthus mucronulatus (Korth.) Miq.
- Lasianthus myrtifolius Ridl.
- Lasianthus naikii V.S.Dang & Vuong
- Lasianthus neolanceolatus Ridsdale
- Lasianthus nervosus King & Gamble
- Lasianthus nghiasonii V.S.Dang & Naiki
- Lasianthus ngoclinhensis V.S.Dang, Naiki & Yahara
- Lasianthus nhatrangensis V.S.Dang & Naiki
- Lasianthus nigrescens H.Zhu
- Lasianthus nuichuaensis V.S.Dang & Naiki
- Lasianthus oblanceolatus Naiki, Tagane & Yahara
- Lasianthus obliquinervis Merr.
- Lasianthus obliquus (Thwaites) Thwaites
- Lasianthus oblongatus Merr.
- Lasianthus oblongifolius Bedd.
- Lasianthus oblongilobus H.Zhu
- Lasianthus oblongus King & Gamble
- Lasianthus obovatibracteatus H.Zhu
- Lasianthus obovatus Bedd.
- Lasianthus obscurus (DC.) Blume ex Miq.
- Lasianthus oliganthus Thwaites
- Lasianthus oligoneurus K.Schum.
- Lasianthus ovatus (Korth.) Miq.
- Lasianthus palawanensis H.Zhu
- Lasianthus panamensis (Dwyer) Robbr.
- Lasianthus papuanus Wernham
- Lasianthus parviflorus H.Zhu
- Lasianthus parvifolius Wight
- Lasianthus pauciflorus Wight
- Lasianthus pedicellatus H.Zhu
- Lasianthus pedunculatus E.A.Bruce
- Lasianthus pendulus Ridl.
- Lasianthus perakensis King & Gamble
- Lasianthus pergamaceus King & Gamble
- Lasianthus phamhoangii V.S.Dang & Naiki
- Lasianthus phymatodeus H.Zhu
- Lasianthus pierrei Pit.
- Lasianthus pilosus Wight
- Lasianthus platyphyllus (Korth.) Miq.
- Lasianthus politus Ridl.
- Lasianthus protractus (Thwaites) Thwaites
- Lasianthus pseudolongifolius H.Zhu
- Lasianthus pseudostipularis Amshoff ex Bakh.f.
- Lasianthus puberulus Craib
- Lasianthus puffii Napiroon, Balslev & Poopath
- Lasianthus purpureocalyx Napiroon, Chamch., Balslev & Chayam.
- Lasianthus purpureus Blume
- Lasianthus rabilii Craib
- Lasianthus repens Hepper
- Lasianthus repoeuensis Pierre ex Pit.
- Lasianthus reticulatus Blume
- Lasianthus rhinocerotis Blume
- Lasianthus rhizophyllus (Thwaites) Thwaites
- Lasianthus ridleyi King & Gamble
- Lasianthus ridsdalei H.Zhu
- Lasianthus rigidus Miq.
- Lasianthus robinsonii Ridl.
- Lasianthus roosianus H.Zhu
- Lasianthus rostratus Wight
- Lasianthus rotundatus Stapf
- Lasianthus rufus (Korth.) Miq.
- Lasianthus sabahensis H.Zhu
- Lasianthus sapaensis V.S.Dang & Naiki
- Lasianthus saprosmoides Pit.
- Lasianthus sarmentosus Craib
- Lasianthus saxorum Craib
- Lasianthus scabridus King & Gamble
- Lasianthus scalariformis King & Gamble
- Lasianthus schmidtii K.Schum.
- Lasianthus sessilis Talbot
- Lasianthus setulosus H.Zhu
- Lasianthus sikkimensis Hook.f.
- Lasianthus simizui (Tang S.Liu & J.M.Chao) H.Zhu
- Lasianthus sithammaratensis Napiroon, Balslev & Chayam.
- Lasianthus sogerensis Wernham
- Lasianthus solomonensis H.Zhu
- Lasianthus sonlangensis V.S.Dang, Vuong & Quan
- Lasianthus stephanocalycinus Naiki, Tagane & Yahara
- Lasianthus stercorarius Blume
- Lasianthus sterrophyllus Merr.
- Lasianthus stipularis Blume
- Lasianthus strigillosus Hook.f.
- Lasianthus strigosus Wight
- Lasianthus subaureus Craib
- Lasianthus subcalvus Craib
- Lasianthus subglobosus H.Zhu
- Lasianthus submembranifolius Elmer
- Lasianthus sumatraensis H.Zhu
- Lasianthus sylvestroides Valeton
- Lasianthus taiwanensis S.S.Ying
- Lasianthus tamdaoensis V.S.Dang
- Lasianthus tennissarimensis Napiroon, Balslev & Chayam.
- Lasianthus tenuifolius H.Zhu
- Lasianthus tetragonus H.Zhu
- Lasianthus thuathienhuensis V.S.Dang & Naiki
- Lasianthus thuyanae V.S.Dang & Naiki
- Lasianthus thwaitesii Hook.f.
- Lasianthus tomentosus Blume
- Lasianthus trichophlebus Hemsl.
- Lasianthus undulatus H.Zhu
- Lasianthus urophylloides R.D.Good
- Lasianthus varians (Thwaites) Thwaites
- Lasianthus venosus Blume
- Lasianthus venulosus (Wight & Arn.) Wight
- Lasianthus verrucosus H.S.Lo
- Lasianthus verticillatus (Lour.) Merr.
- Lasianthus vietnamensis V.S.Dang, Naiki & Tagane
- Lasianthus viridiramulis Tagane
- Lasianthus vrieseanus Miq.
- Lasianthus vulcanicus Ridl.
- Lasianthus vuquangensis V.S.Dang, Naiki & Yahara
- Lasianthus wallacei E.A.Bruce
- Lasianthus wardii C.E.C.Fisch. & Kaul
- Lasianthus wawoniensis Rugayah & Sunarti
- Lasianthus wightianus Hook.f.
- Lasianthus yaharae V.S.Dang, Tagane & H.Tran
- Lasianthus yalaensis Napiroon, Duangjai & Poopath
- Lasianthus yersinii V.S.Dang & Naiki

== Description ==
Subshrubs, shrubs, or rarely, small trees. Leaves opposite, distichous. Stipules interpetiolar, usually persistent. Inflorescences axillary, usually sessile. Flowers small, white. Calyx with 3 to 6 teeth or lobes; persistent. Corolla with 4 to 6 lobes; throat usually villous. Stamens 4 to 6, inserted on corolla throat. Anthers dorsifixed. Stigma with lanceolate or linear lobes. Ovary multilocular. Ovules basal, erect, 1 per locule. Fruit a small drupe, usually blue. Pyrenes with thick walls.

== History ==
The generic name Lasianthus is derived from the Greek lasios, "shaggy, velvety, hairy", and anthos, "flower". The genus was named by William Jack in 1823.

Some authors have recognized Dressleriopsis and Litosanthes as genera separate from Lasianthus. Dressleriopsis was sunk into Lasianthus in 1982.

Litosanthes was erected by Carl Ludwig Blume in 1823. It was synonymized under Lasianthus in 1992. DNA sequence analysis has not resolved the question of whether Litosanthes is nested within Lasianthus or separate from it.

== Affinities ==
Lasianthus, Saldinia, and Trichostachys form the tribe Lasiantheae in the subfamily Rubioideae. Perama is related to this group and might be included within it. Lasiantheae was formerly thought to be close to Psychotria, but is now known to be a basal clade in Rubioideae. It is sister to the large clade containing Coussarea, Psychotria, Spermacoce, and many other genera.

Saprosma and Amaracarpus were traditionally thought to be close to Lasianthus. Saprosma is polyphyletic, with only part of it related to Lasianthus. Amaracarpus is close to Psychotria. The African genera Batopedina and Dirichletia have also been suggested as relatives of Lasianthus.

== Taxonomy ==
Only one molecular phylogenetic study has sampled more than a few species from the tribe Lasiantheae. In that study, 11 species of Lasianthus were sampled, but few relationships were resolved.

In 2012, a revision of the Malesian species divided Lasianthus into 3 sections, based on the following type species: L. section Stipulares (Lasianthus stipularis), L. section Lasianthus (Lasianthus cyanocarpus), and L. section Nudiflorae (Lasianthus blumeanus). They did not recognize L. section Pedunculatae (Lasianthus biermanii), which some previous authors had recognized. They considered it to be indistinguishable from L. section Lasianthus.
