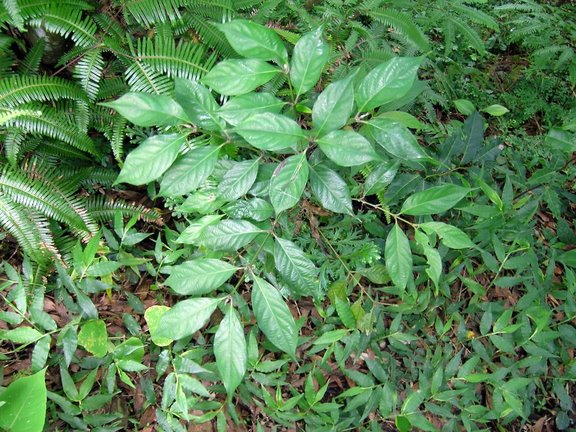
- Lasianthus fordii

Scientific classification
- Kingdom: Plantae
- Clade: Tracheophytes
- Clade: Angiosperms
- Clade: Eudicots
- Clade: Asterids
- Order: Gentianales
- Family: Rubiaceae
- Subfamily: Rubioideae
- Tribe: Lasiantheae; B.Bremer & Manen

= Lasiantheae =

Tribe of plants

Lasiantheae is a tribe of flowering plants in the family Rubiaceae and contains 239 species in 3 genera. Its representatives are found in Central America, the Caribbean, tropical Africa, and tropical and subtropical Asia.

== Genera ==
Currently accepted names

- Lasianthus Jack (203 sp) - distribution of the tribe
- Saldinia A.Rich. ex DC. (22 sp) - Comoros, Madagascar
- Trichostachys Hook.f. (14 sp) - West and West-Central tropical Africa

Synonyms

- Dasus Lour. = Lasianthus
- Dressleriopsis Dwyer = Lasianthus
- Litosanthes Blume = Lasianthus
- Mephitidia Reinw. ex Blume = Lasianthus
- Octavia DC. = Lasianthus
- Santia Wight & Arn. = Lasianthus
