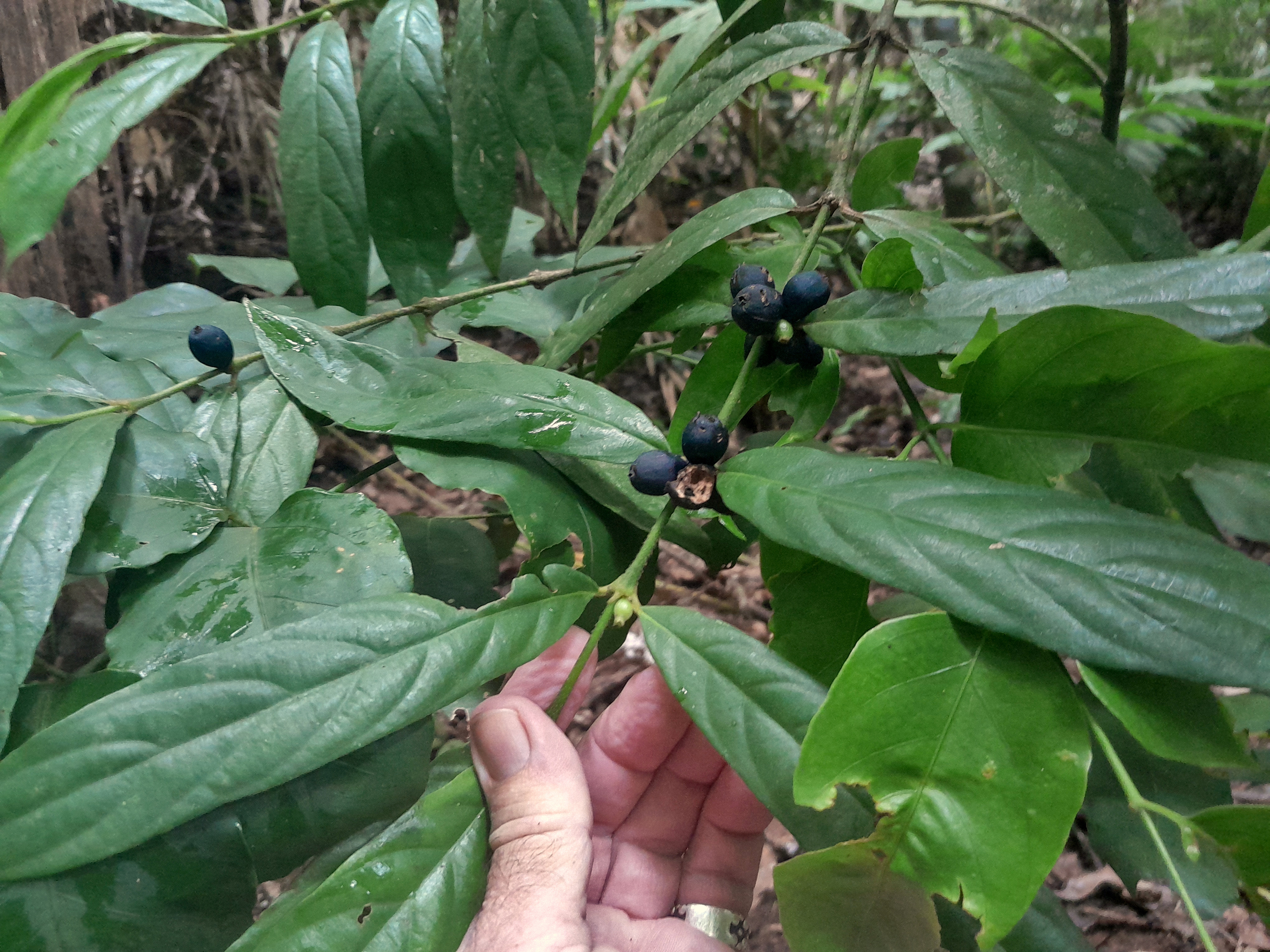

Conservation status
- Least Concern (NCA)

Scientific classification
- Kingdom: Plantae
- Clade: Tracheophytes
- Clade: Angiosperms
- Clade: Eudicots
- Clade: Asterids
- Order: Gentianales
- Family: Rubiaceae
- Genus: Lasianthus
- Species: L. chlorocarpus

Binomial name
- Lasianthus chlorocarpus K.Schum.

Synonyms
- Lasianthus chlorocarpus var. curvinervis Valeton

= Lasianthus chlorocarpus =

Blue rubi

Species of flowering plant

Lasianthus chlorocarpus, commonly known as blue rubi, is a plant in the family Rubiaceae native to parts of Malesia, Papuasia and Australia. It is an evergreen shrub growing up to 2 m (6 ft 7 in) high in well developed rainforest.

== Description ==
Lasianthus chlorocarpus is an understorey shrub of rainforest habitats, growing up to 2 m (6 ft 7 in) in height. The leaves are simple and opposite, glabrous above and finely hairy below. They are long and narrow − up to 19 cm (7.5 in) by 5 cm (2.0 in) − with smooth margins. They have around eight pairs of lateral veins which curve strongly and run almost parallel to the leaf margin, but do not form loops with the following pair.

The flowers are produced in the leaf axils and are about 10 mm (0.39 in) in diameter with 4 or 5 white petals. The fruit is an ovoid drupe up to 16 mm (0.63 in) long by 12 mm (0.47 in) wide, dark blue or blackish, with the green calyx persitant at the apex. Fine hairs cover the outer surface, giving it a shiny appearance. They usually contain four seeds about 6 mm (0.24 in) long by 3 mm (0.12 in) wide.

=== Phenology ===
In Australia flowering occurs almost year-round from April to February, and similarly fruit ripen from February to December.

== Taxonomy ==
This species was described in 1905 by Karl Moritz Schumann in the book Nachträge zur Flora der deutschen Schutzgebiete in der Südsee which he co-authoured with Carl Adolf Georg Lauterbach. The description was based on material collected in 1896 by Lauterbach in "Kaiser-Wilhelmsland" (the northern part of present day Papua New Guinea).

In Australia, the name Lasianthus strigosus was misapplied to this species in the past.

== Distribution and habitat ==
The natural range of the blue rubi includes Sulawesi and the Lesser Sunda Islands, the Philippines, New Guinea and the Solomon Islands, and Queensland. In Queensland it is found in the northeastern coastal forests, in three small pockets in the northern half of Cape York Peninsula, and a much larger concentration between Rossville and Tully.

It grows in well developed rainforest, at altitudes from sea level to 500 m (1,600 ft).

== Conservation ==
This species is listed by the Queensland Department of Environment and Science as least concern. As of 4 April 2023, it has not been assessed by the International Union for Conservation of Nature (IUCN).

== Gallery ==
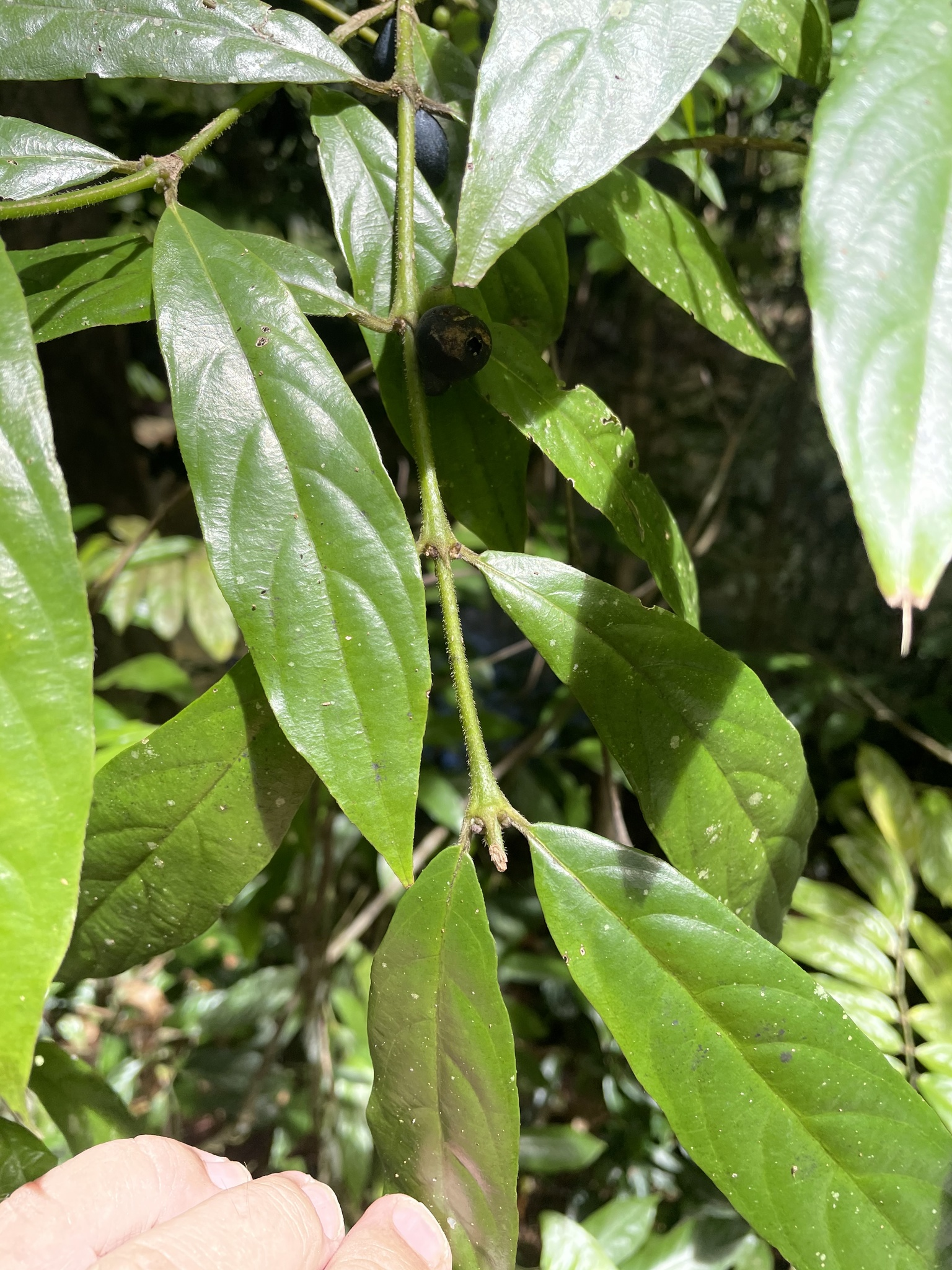
Foliage

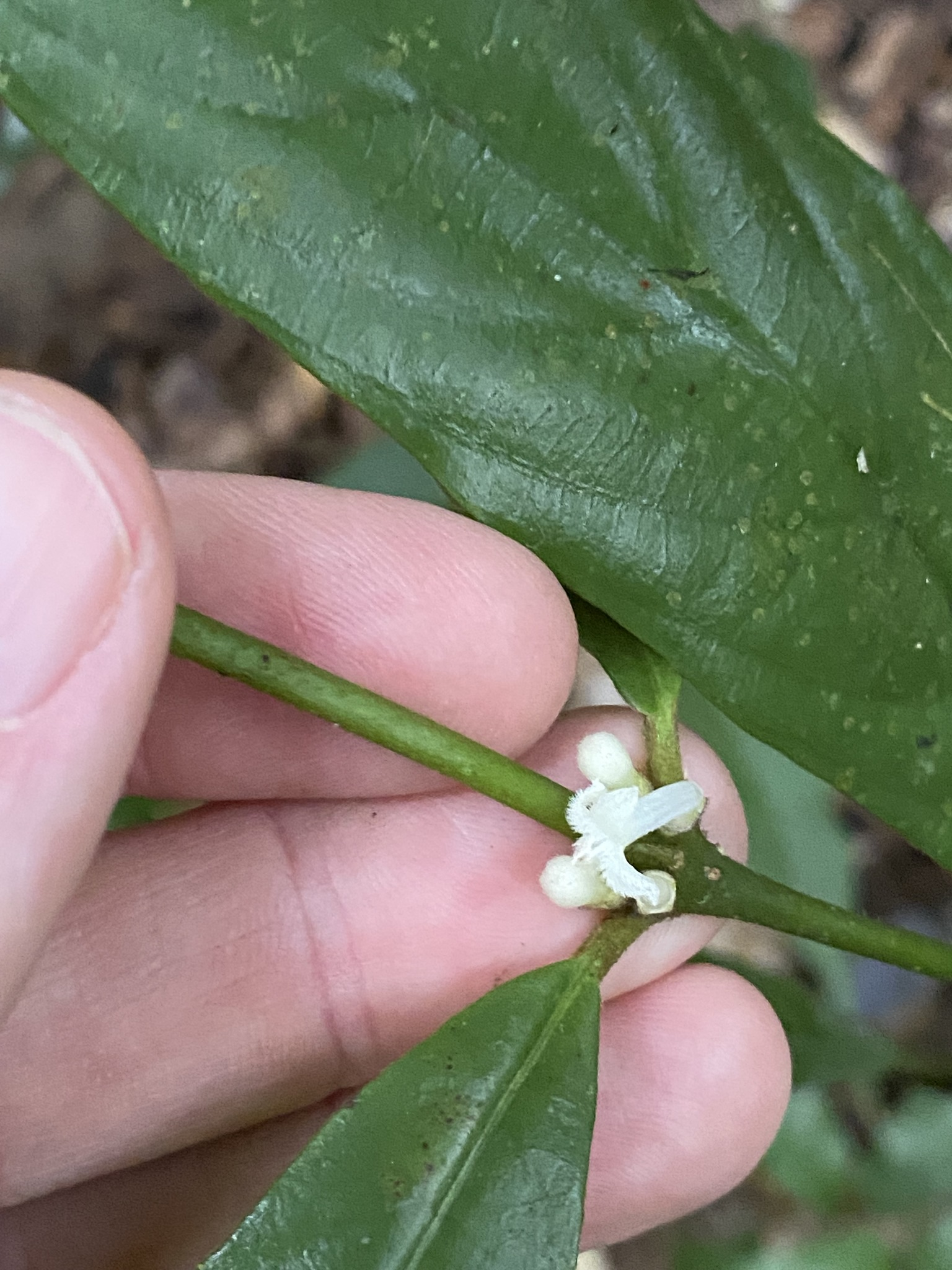
Flowers

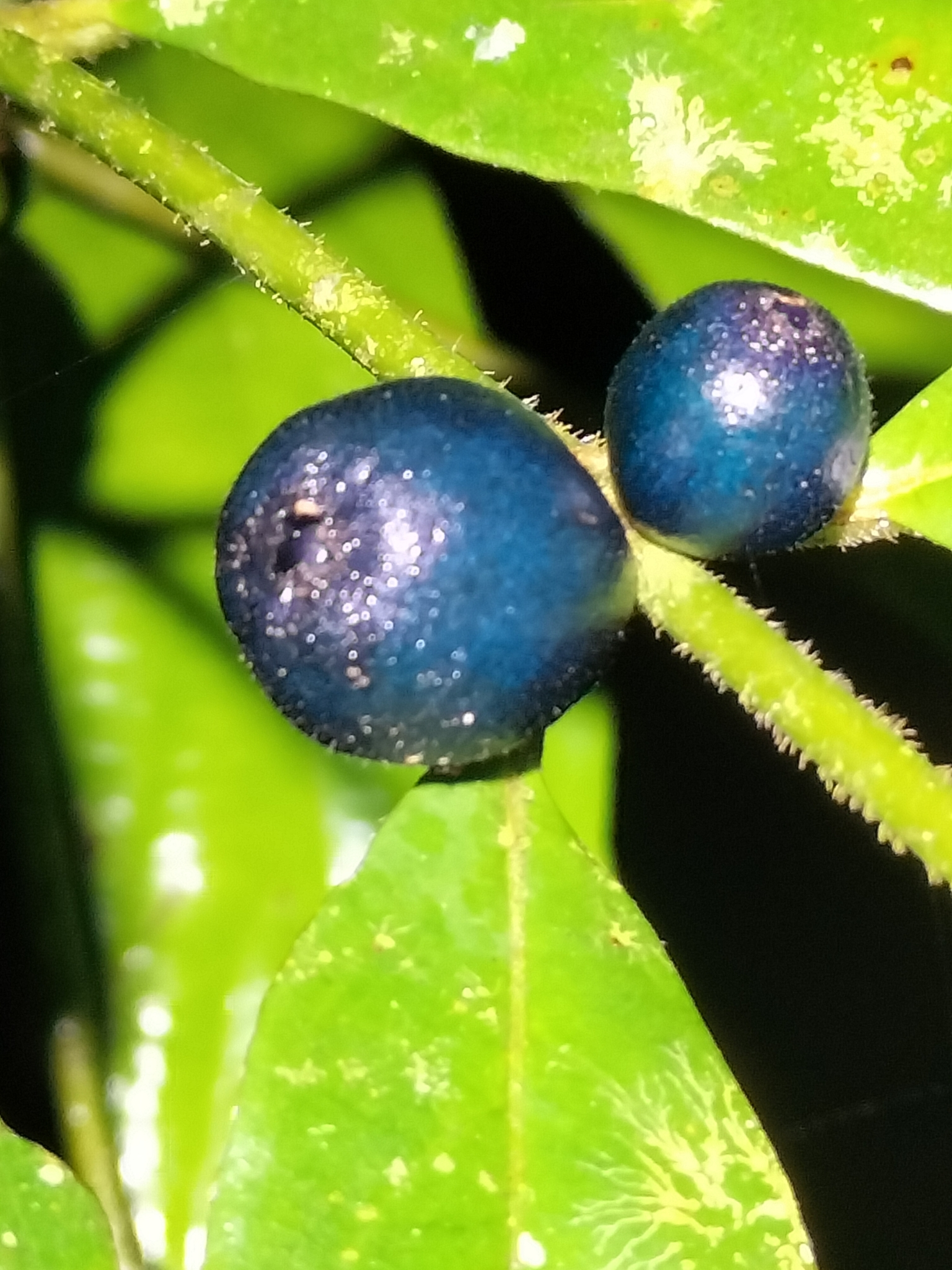
Fruit

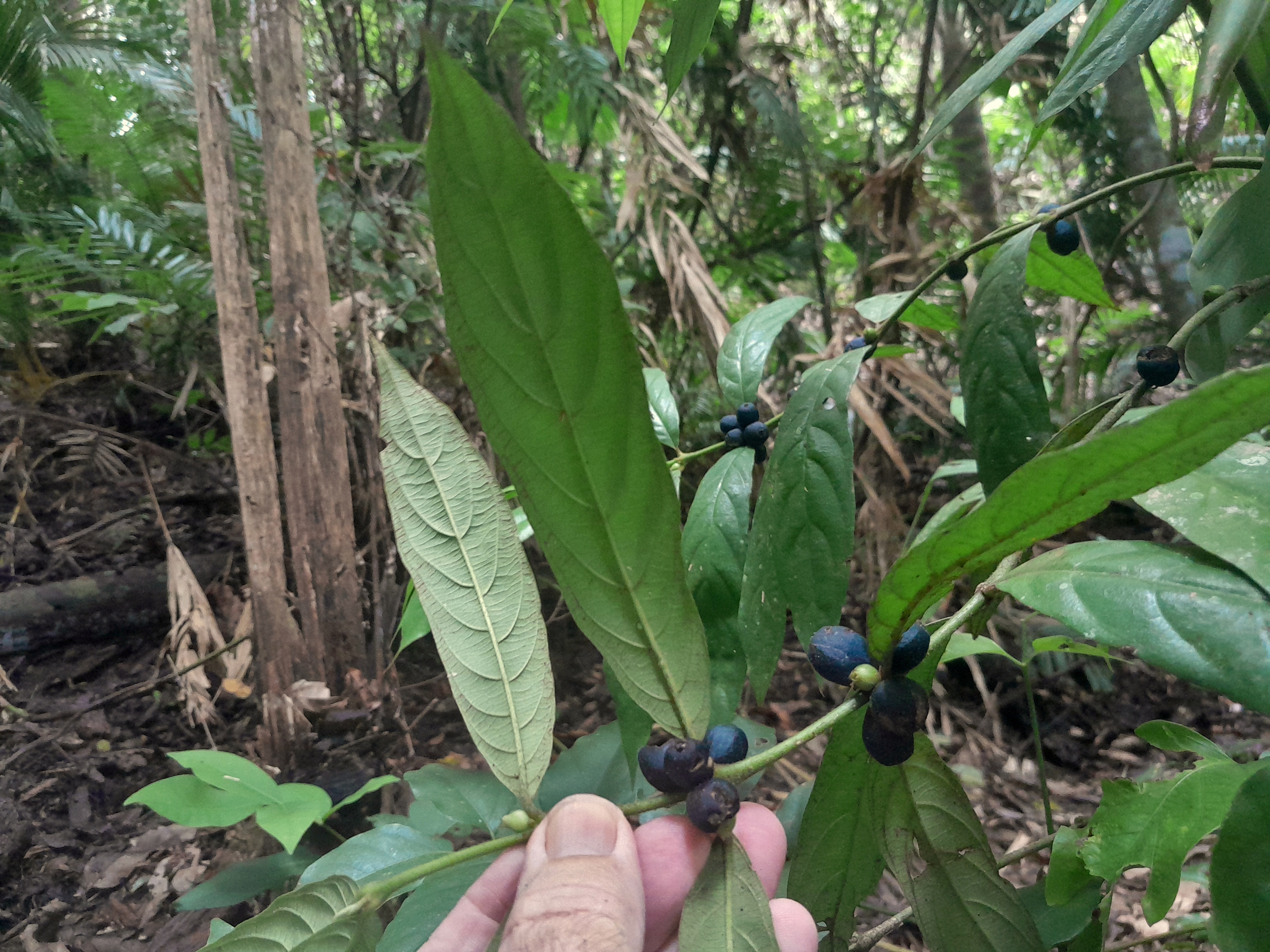
Foliage and fruit

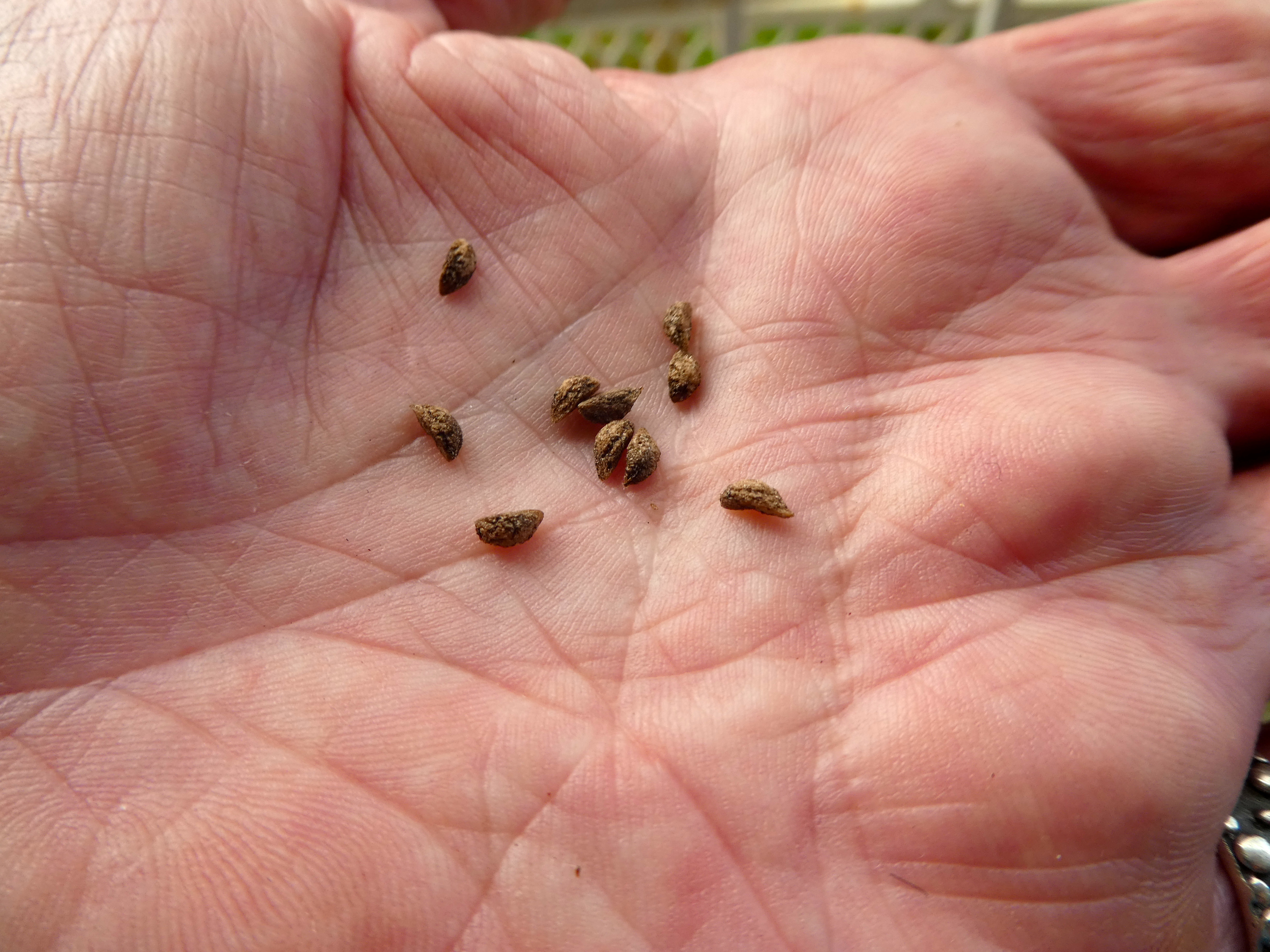
Seeds
