= L. gardneri =

L. gardneri may refer to:

- Lasianthus gardneri, a plant species endemic to Sri Lanka
- Litsea gardneri, a plant species endemic to Sri Lanka

== See also ==
- Gardneri
