= Lasianthus wallacei =

Conservation status
- Endangered (IUCN 3.1)

Scientific classification
- Kingdom: Plantae
- Clade: Tracheophytes
- Clade: Angiosperms
- Clade: Eudicots
- Clade: Asterids
- Order: Gentianales
- Family: Rubiaceae
- Genus: Lasianthus
- Species: L. wallacei

Binomial name
- Lasianthus wallacei E.A.Bruce

Species of plant

Lasianthus wallacei is a species of plant in the family Rubiaceae. It is endemic to Tanzania.
