= Lasianthus cyanocarpus =

Scientific classification
- Kingdom: Plantae
- Clade: Embryophytes
- Clade: Tracheophytes
- Clade: Spermatophytes
- Clade: Angiosperms
- Clade: Eudicots
- Clade: Asterids
- Order: Gentianales
- Family: Rubiaceae
- Genus: Lasianthus
- Species: L. cyanocarpus

Binomial name
- Lasianthus cyanocarpus Jack

Species of flowering plant in the family Rubiaceae

Lasianthus cyanocarpus is a species of flowering plant in the family Rubiaceae. It is a tropical understory shrub distributed across parts of South and Southeast Asia, including India, Sri Lanka, Myanmar, Thailand, Malaysia, Indonesia, and the Philippines.

== Description ==
Lasianthus cyanocarpus is an evergreen shrub or small understory plant typically occurring in moist tropical forests. The species bears opposite leaves with entire margins and interpetiolar stipules characteristic of the genus Lasianthus. The inflorescences are axillary, with small white tubular flowers. The fruits are fleshy berries that become bluish to dark blue on maturity, a feature reflected in the specific epithet cyanocarpus, meaning "blue-fruited".

== Taxonomy ==
The species was first described by the Scottish botanist William Jack in the early nineteenth century. It belongs to the tribe Lasiantheae within the family Rubiaceae.

Several regional floras and taxonomic revisions have recognised the species as morphologically variable across its range.

== Distribution and habitat ==
Lasianthus cyanocarpus occurs in tropical evergreen and semi-evergreen forests, often in shaded understory habitats. In India it has been recorded from the Western Ghats, northeastern India, and the Andaman Islands.

The species is also widely distributed in Sri Lanka and throughout Malesia.

== Ecology ==
The fleshy fruits are likely dispersed by birds and small mammals, as in many other species of Lasianthus. The plant forms part of the shaded forest understory vegetation in humid tropical ecosystems.
