= Lasianthus tomentosus =

Conservation status
- Least Concern (IUCN 3.1)

Scientific classification
- Kingdom: Plantae
- Clade: Tracheophytes
- Clade: Angiosperms
- Clade: Eudicots
- Clade: Asterids
- Order: Gentianales
- Family: Rubiaceae
- Genus: Lasianthus
- Species: L. tomentosus

Binomial name
- Lasianthus tomentosus Blume

Synonyms
- Mephitidia obscura Zoll. ex Miq., nom. illeg. homonym. post.; Mephitidia tomentosa (Blume) DC.; Nonatelia tomentosa (Blume) Kuntze

Species of flowering plant

Lasianthus tomentosus is a species of plant in the genus Lasianthus within the family Rubiaceae. It is found in Thailand, Java, Sulawesi and New Guinea. It is possibly threatened by habitat loss. Its conservation status is uncertain because of the difficulty of identifying it. Several botanical works have mistakenly described Lasianthus trichophlebus, var. latifolius as Lasianthus tomentosus.
