= Lasianthus blumeanus =

Scientific classification
- Kingdom: Plantae
- Clade: Tracheophytes
- Clade: Angiosperms
- Clade: Eudicots
- Clade: Asterids
- Order: Gentianales
- Family: Rubiaceae
- Genus: Lasianthus
- Species: L. blumeanus

Binomial name
- Lasianthus blumeanus Wight

Species of flowering plant in the family Rubiaceae

Lasianthus blumeanus is a species of flowering plant in the family Rubiaceae. It is an understory shrub native to the southern Western Ghats of India, particularly Kerala and Tamil Nadu.

== Description ==
Lasianthus blumeanus is a tropical shrub with opposite leaves and interpetiolar stipules characteristic of the family Rubiaceae. The flowers are small and borne in axillary clusters, while the fruits are fleshy drupes that darken upon maturity

== Distribution and habitat ==
The species occurs in tropical evergreen and semi-evergreen forests. In India, it has been recorded from the Western Ghats.

== Taxonomy ==
The species was described by Robert Wight. It belongs to the genus Lasianthus, a group of tropical shrubs distributed mainly in Asia and known for their forest understory habitat.
