= Lasianthus kilimandscharicus =

Scientific classification
- Kingdom: Plantae
- Clade: Tracheophytes
- Clade: Angiosperms
- Clade: Eudicots
- Clade: Asterids
- Order: Gentianales
- Family: Rubiaceae
- Genus: Lasianthus
- Species: L. kilimandscharicus

Binomial name
- Lasianthus kilimandscharicus K.Schum.

Species of plant

Lasianthus kilimandscharicus is a shrub or tree found in Kenya. It becomes 2–7 metres (6 ft 7 in – 23 ft 0 in) tall; bark smooth, grey. Leaves (narrowly) elliptic, base cuneate, apex acuminate, 9–17 centimetres (3.5–6.7 in) by 2–6 cm (0.79–2.36 in), glabrous or nearly so. Flowers white or pale purple.
