= Lasianthus oliganthus =

Conservation status
- Conservation Dependent (IUCN 2.3)

Scientific classification
- Kingdom: Plantae
- Clade: Tracheophytes
- Clade: Angiosperms
- Clade: Eudicots
- Clade: Asterids
- Order: Gentianales
- Family: Rubiaceae
- Genus: Lasianthus
- Species: L. oliganthus

Binomial name
- Lasianthus oliganthus Thwaites

Species of plant

Lasianthus oliganthus is a species of plant in the family Rubiaceae. It is endemic to Sri Lanka.

== Leaves ==
Acute to obtuse base, pointed apex, 4-5 lateral veins.

== Trunk ==
Branches slender, slightly rough, adpressed hairs.

== Flowers ==
Very small, sessile, solitary, or 2 or 3.

== Fruits ==
Very small, depressed berry, truncate at top.

== Ecology ==
Rain forest understory of wet zone.
