= Lasianthus varians =

Conservation status
- Endangered (IUCN 2.3)

Scientific classification
- Kingdom: Plantae
- Clade: Tracheophytes
- Clade: Angiosperms
- Clade: Eudicots
- Clade: Asterids
- Order: Gentianales
- Family: Rubiaceae
- Genus: Lasianthus
- Species: L. varians

Binomial name
- Lasianthus varians (Thwaites) Thwaites

Synonyms
- Litosanthes varians (Thwaites) Deb & M.Gangop.; Mephitidia varians Thwaites; Nonatelia varians (Thwaites) Kuntze

Species of plant

Lasianthus varians is a species of plant in the family Rubiaceae. It is a shrub endemic to Sri Lanka.
