= Lasianthus rostratus =

Conservation status
- Vulnerable (IUCN 2.3)

Scientific classification
- Kingdom: Plantae
- Clade: Tracheophytes
- Clade: Angiosperms
- Clade: Eudicots
- Clade: Asterids
- Order: Gentianales
- Family: Rubiaceae
- Genus: Lasianthus
- Species: L. rostratus

Binomial name
- Lasianthus rostratus Wight

Species of plant

Lasianthus rostratus is a species of plant in the family Rubiaceae. It is endemic to Kerala in India.
