= Lasianthus rhinophyllus =

Conservation status
- Critically Endangered (IUCN 2.3)

Scientific classification
- Kingdom: Plantae
- Clade: Tracheophytes
- Clade: Angiosperms
- Clade: Eudicots
- Clade: Asterids
- Order: Gentianales
- Family: Rubiaceae
- Genus: Lasianthus
- Species: L. rhinophyllus

Binomial name
- Lasianthus rhinophyllus (Thwaites) Thwaites

Species of plant

Lasianthus rhinophyllus is a species of plant in the family Rubiaceae. It is endemic to Sri Lanka. The name may also be spelt Lasianthus rhizophyllus.

== Taxonomy ==
There is some confusion over the spelling of the epithet. As of 15 March 2023, the International Plant Names Index has the spelling rhinophyllus, whereas Plants of the World Online has rhizophyllus.
