= Lasianthus macrocalyx =

Conservation status
- Vulnerable (IUCN 2.3)

Scientific classification
- Kingdom: Plantae
- Clade: Tracheophytes
- Clade: Angiosperms
- Clade: Eudicots
- Clade: Asterids
- Order: Gentianales
- Family: Rubiaceae
- Genus: Lasianthus
- Species: L. macrocalyx

Binomial name
- Lasianthus macrocalyx K.Schum.

Synonyms
- Lasianthus grandifolius Verdc.

Species of plant

Lasianthus macrocalyx, synonym Lasianthus grandifolius, is a species of flowering plant in the family Rubiaceae, endemic to Tanzania. It was first described by Karl Moritz Schumann in 1900.
