= Lasianthus agasthyamalayanus =

Scientific classification
- Kingdom: Plantae
- Clade: Tracheophytes
- Clade: Angiosperms
- Clade: Eudicots
- Clade: Asterids
- Order: Gentianales
- Family: Rubiaceae
- Genus: Lasianthus
- Species: L. agasthyamalayanus

Binomial name
- Lasianthus agasthyamalayanus R.Jagad., S.P.Mathew, Gangapr. & E.S.S.Kumar

Species of shrub in the family Rubiaceae

Lasianthus agasthyamalayanus is a species of flowering plant in the family Rubiaceae. It is endemic to the southern Western Ghats of Kerala, India. The species was formally described in 2018 from the Agasthyamalai region of the southern Western Ghats.

== Description ==
Lasianthus agasthyamalayanus is an understory shrub of evergreen forests. It resembles Lasianthus obliquus but differs in having glabrous mature branches, comparatively smaller leaves with apiculate apices, broadly ovate triangular stipules, larger flowers, elliptic-lanceolate calyx lobes, and black mature fruits.

== Taxonomy ==
The species was described by Jagadeesan Raveendran, Sam P. Mathew, Gangaprasad Appukuttannair and E.S. Santhosh Kumar in 2018. It belongs to the genus Lasianthus, a tropical Asian genus within the tribe Lasiantheae of the family Rubiaceae.

== Distribution and habitat ==
The species is known only from the southern Western Ghats in Kerala, particularly from the Agasthyamalai hills. It grows in tropical evergreen forest habitats.

== Etymology ==
The specific epithet agasthyamalayanus refers to the Agasthyamalai region of the southern Western Ghats, where the species was discovered.
