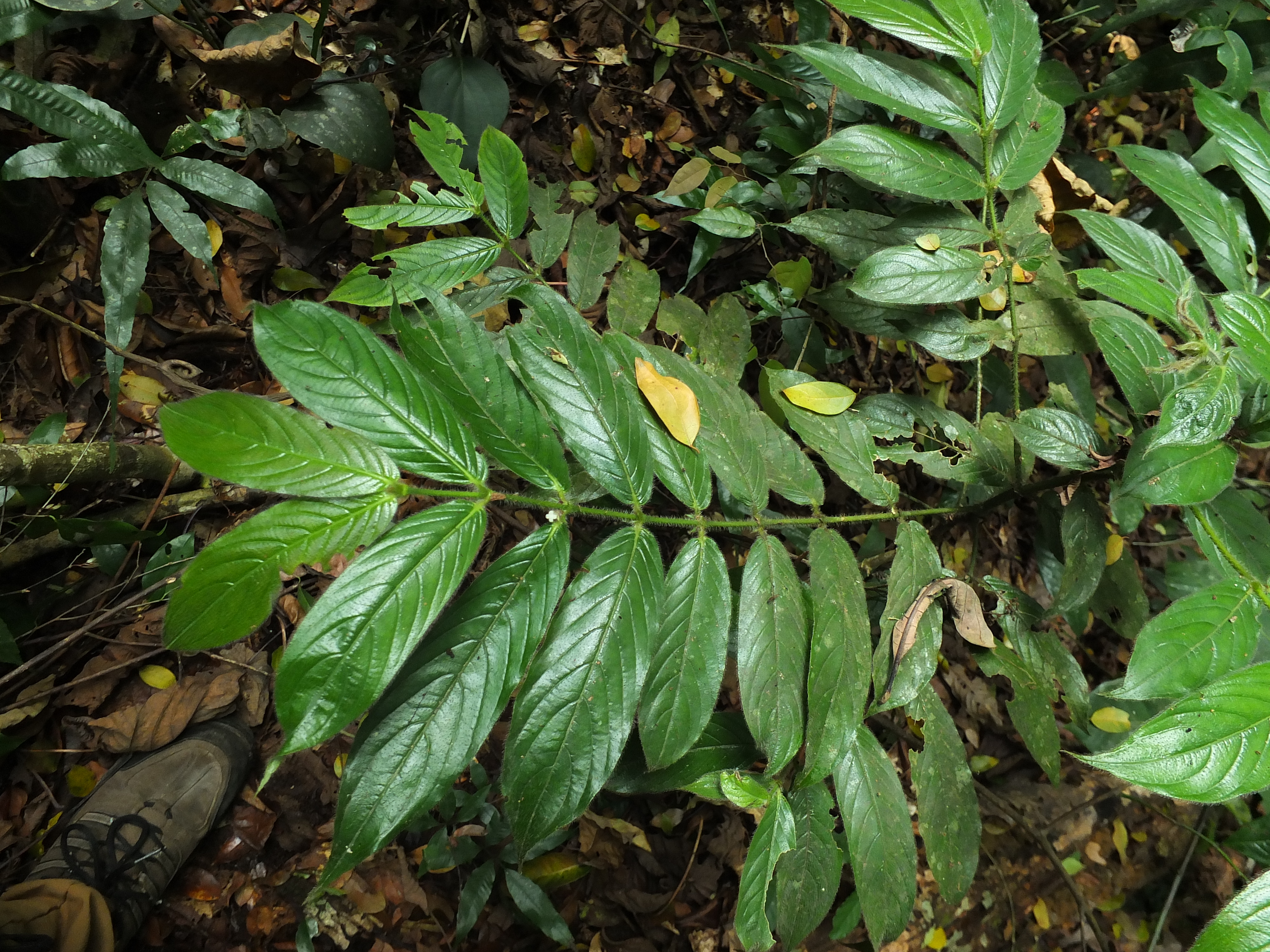
- Lasianthus jackianus

Scientific classification
- Kingdom: Plantae
- Clade: Tracheophytes
- Clade: Angiosperms
- Clade: Eudicots
- Clade: Asterids
- Order: Gentianales
- Family: Rubiaceae
- Genus: Lasianthus
- Species: L. jackianus

Binomial name
- Lasianthus jackianus Wight

= Lasianthus jackianus =

Species of flowering plant in the family Rubiaceae

Lasianthus jackianus is a species of flowering plant in the family Rubiaceae. It is a tropical understory shrub native to parts of South and Southeast Asia, including India and Sri Lanka.

== Description ==
Lasianthus jackianus is a shrub characterized by opposite leaves, interpetiolar stipules, and small pale flowers borne in axillary clusters. The branchlets are usually slender, and the fruits are berry-like drupes that become dark when mature.

== Distribution and habitat ==
The species occurs in tropical evergreen and semi-evergreen forests. In India, it has been recorded from the Western Ghats, including Kerala and Tamil Nadu. It grows mainly in shaded forest understories at low to mid elevations.

== Taxonomy ==
The species was first described by the botanist Robert Wight. It belongs to the genus Lasianthus, a large group of tropical shrubs distributed mainly in Asia.
