= Lasianthus gardneri =

Conservation status
- Vulnerable (IUCN 2.3)

Scientific classification
- Kingdom: Plantae
- Clade: Tracheophytes
- Clade: Angiosperms
- Clade: Eudicots
- Clade: Asterids
- Order: Gentianales
- Family: Rubiaceae
- Genus: Lasianthus
- Species: L. gardneri

Binomial name
- Lasianthus gardneri Hook.f.

Species of plant

Lasianthus gardneri is a species of plant in the family Rubiaceae. It is endemic to Sri Lanka.
