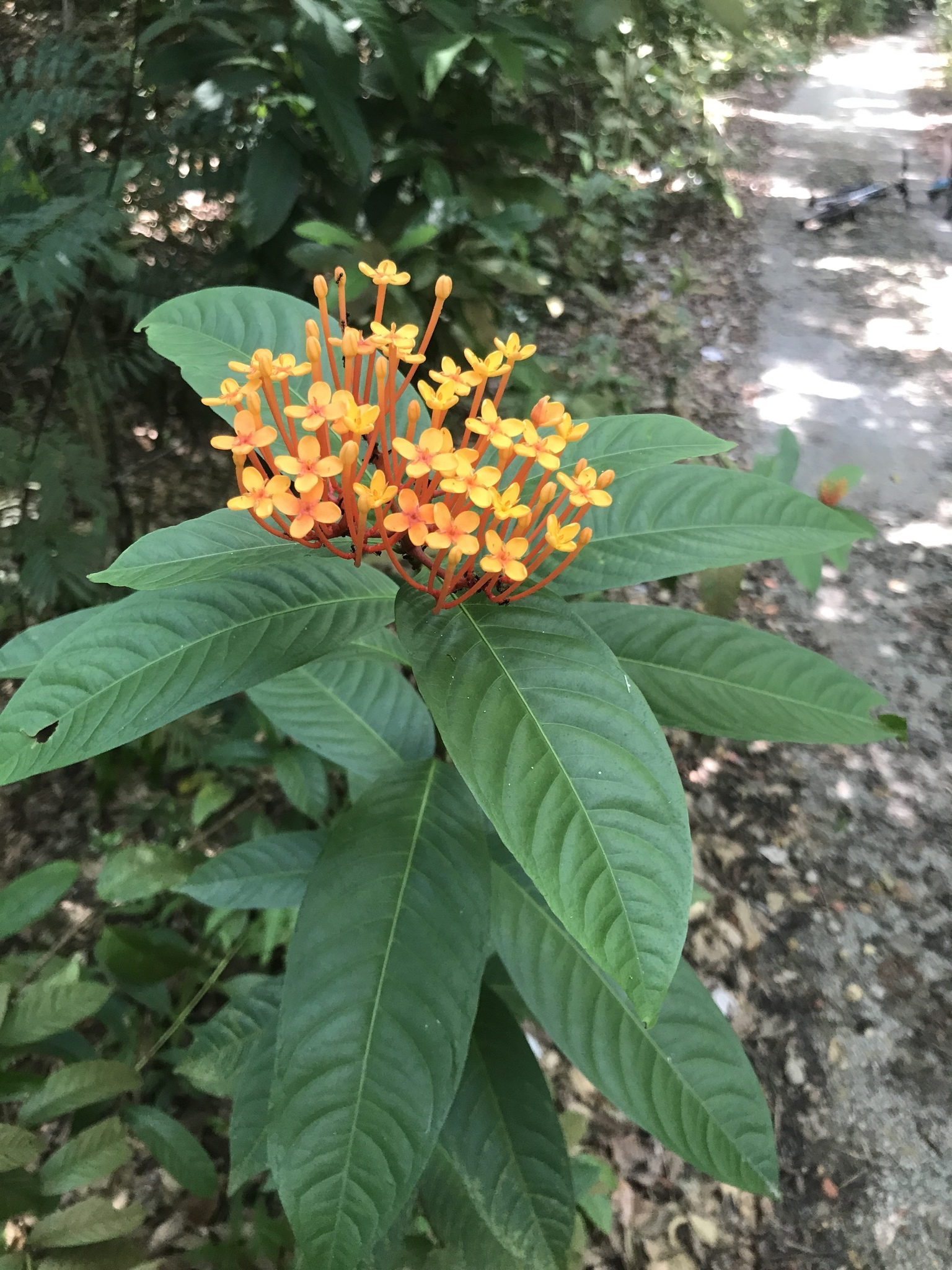
- On Pulau Ubin, Singapore

Scientific classification
- Kingdom: Plantae
- Clade: Tracheophytes
- Clade: Angiosperms
- Clade: Eudicots
- Clade: Asterids
- Order: Gentianales
- Family: Rubiaceae
- Genus: Ixora
- Species: I. congesta

Binomial name
- Ixora congesta Roxb.

Synonyms
- Pavetta congesta (Roxb.) Miq.

= Ixora congesta =

Species of plant

Ixora congesta, the Malayan Ixora, is a species of flowering plant in the family Rubiaceae, native to Malesia. An evergreen shrub or small tree of the understory of monsoonal and rain forests, it can handle coastal salt spray but is also found inland.
