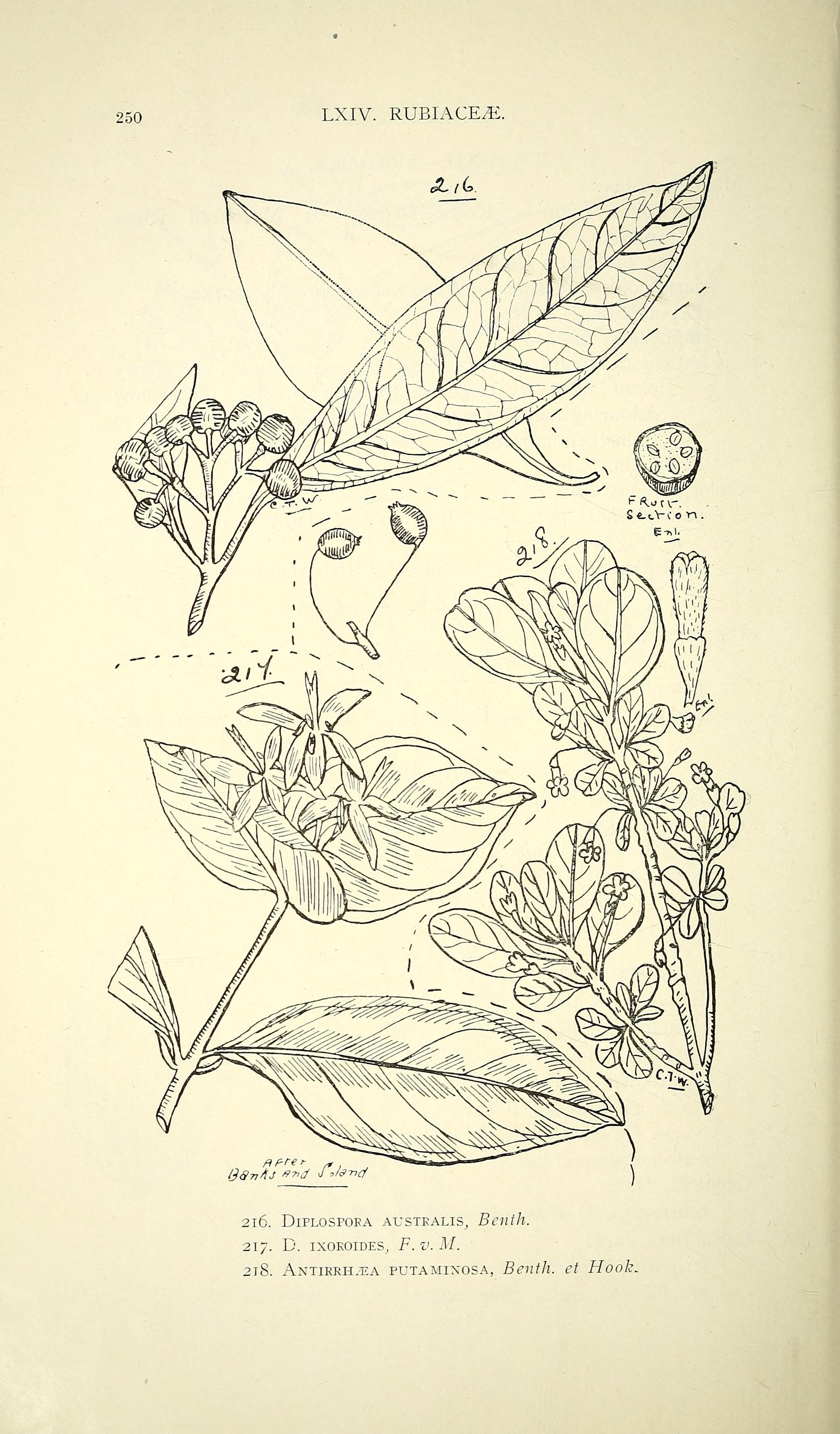

Scientific classification
- Kingdom: Plantae
- Clade: Tracheophytes
- Clade: Angiosperms
- Clade: Eudicots
- Clade: Asterids
- Order: Gentianales
- Family: Rubiaceae
- Genus: Lasianthus
- Species: L. strigosus

Binomial name
- Lasianthus strigosus Wight

= Lasianthus strigosus =

Species of plant

Lasianthus strigosus is a species of plant in the family Rubiaceae. It is endemic to Sri Lanka.

== Culture ==
It is known as "වල් කෝපි - wild coffee" in Sinhala.
