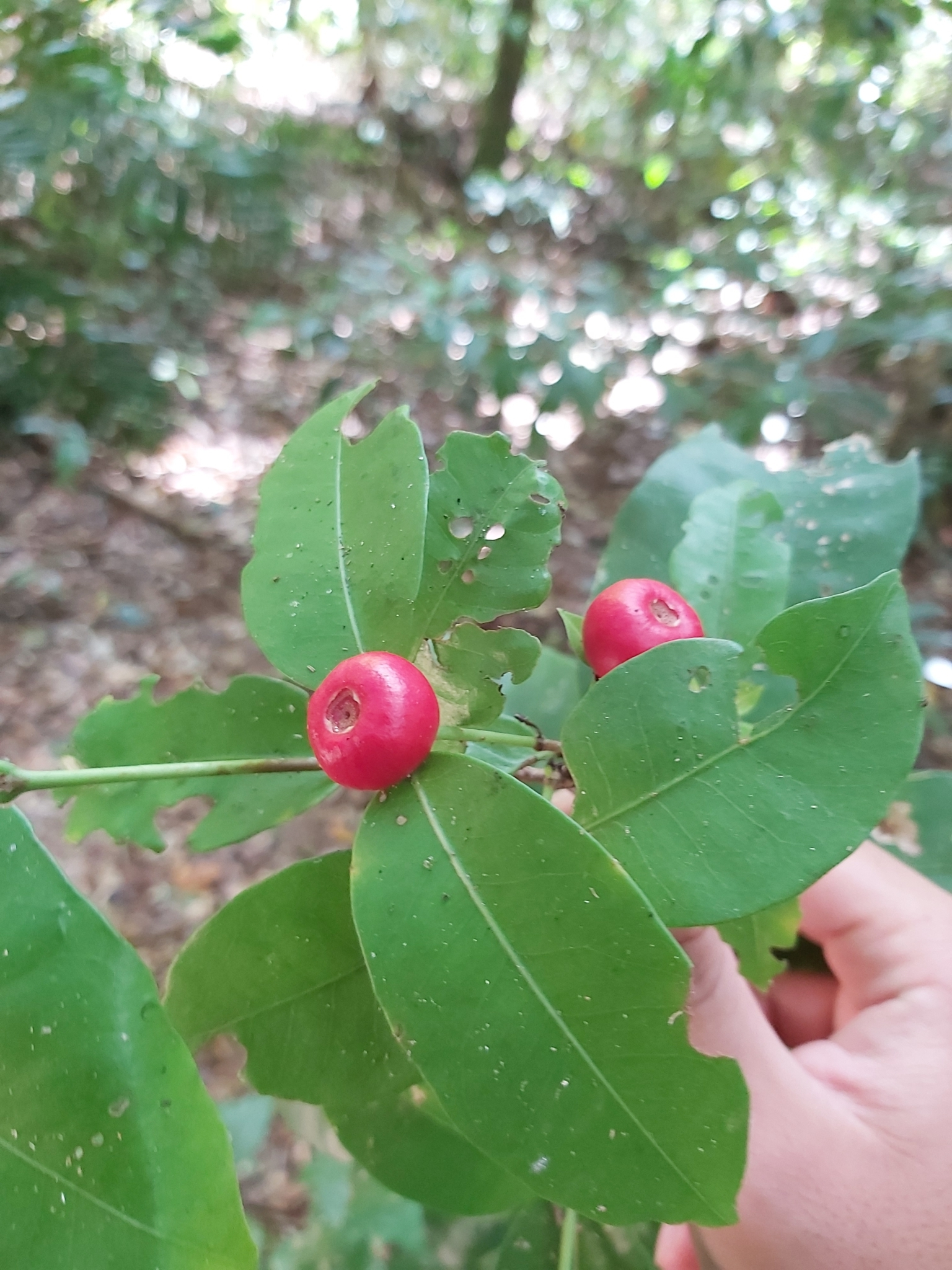
- In rainforest near Cape Tribulation

Conservation status
- Least Concern (NCA)

Scientific classification
- Kingdom: Plantae
- Clade: Tracheophytes
- Clade: Angiosperms
- Clade: Eudicots
- Clade: Asterids
- Order: Gentianales
- Family: Rubiaceae
- Genus: Ixora
- Species: I. biflora

Binomial name
- Ixora biflora Fosberg

Synonyms
- Ixora biflora var. fleckeri Fosberg; Ixora biflora var. typica Fosberg

= Ixora biflora =

Species of flowering plant

Ixora biflora is a shrub in the family Rubiaceae growing up to 2 m (6 ft 7 in) high. It is endemic to northeastern Queensland, Australia, and inhabits the understorey of well developed rainforests. Its main range extends from the vicinity of Rossville to just south of Port Douglas, with isolated occurrences as far south as Mackay.

== Taxonomy ==
Ixora biflora was first described by the American botanist Francis Raymond Fosberg, and his paper − titled Two Queensland Ixoras − was published in the Journal of Botany, British and Foreign in 1938. He based his description on material collected in 1932 by L.J. Brass on the slopes of Mt Demi (a peak near Mossman Gorge).

== Conservation ==
This species is listed by the Queensland Department of Environment and Science as least concern. As of 19 April 2023, it has not been assessed by the International Union for Conservation of Nature (IUCN).
