= Ixora laxiflora =

Scientific classification
- Kingdom: Plantae
- Clade: Tracheophytes
- Clade: Angiosperms
- Clade: Eudicots
- Clade: Asterids
- Order: Gentianales
- Family: Rubiaceae
- Genus: Ixora
- Species: I. laxiflora

Binomial name
- Ixora laxiflora Sm.

Species of shrub

Ixora laxiflora is a shrub or small tree with fragrant white colored flowers belonging to the family Rubiaceae.

== Varieties ==
- Ixora laxiflora var. laxiflora
- Ixora laxiflora var. linderi (Hutch. & Dalziel) De Block

== Description ==
Ixora laxiflora is a shrub or small tree that sometimes grows up to a maximum height of 15 metres (49 ft). Leaves are elliptic to obovate in shape, margins entire, the longest reaches up to 20 centimetres (8 in) long and 8 centimetres (3 in) wide, the apex is acuminate while base tend to be wedged shaped. Inflorescence is a terminal branched corymbose, axis is reddish with leafy bracts growing at base of the inflorescence; flowers are white or pink, corolla tube is slender up to 2–3 centimetres (0.8–1.2 in) long.

== Distribution ==
Occurs in West Africa, from Guinea Bissau westwards to Ghana. Found in moist and gallery forests and along streams.

== Uses ==
Extracts is used in ethnomedicine for pain management.
