= Ixora hiernii =

Scientific classification
- Kingdom: Plantae
- Clade: Tracheophytes
- Clade: Angiosperms
- Clade: Eudicots
- Clade: Asterids
- Order: Gentianales
- Family: Rubiaceae
- Genus: Ixora
- Species: I. hiernii

Binomial name
- Ixora hiernii Scott Elliot

Species of plant

Ixora hiernii is a shrub or small tree within the family Rubiaceae. It is named after botanist William Philip Hiern.

== Description ==
A shrub that reaches a maximum height of 7 m. The leaves of the species commonly have stipules and petioles and are elliptic to lanceolate in outline, the apex tend to be pointed while the base tend to have a rounded wedge shape; the upper surface of leaf is leathery in texture and leaflets can reach up to 18 cm long and 7 cm wide. Inflorescence is corymbose, sub-sessile, the flora axis is reddish and densely hairy; flowers are white to pink in color and the corolla tube can reach 3 cm in length. The fruit is reddish in color and globose in shape, it is 1-2 seeded.

== Distribution ==
Occurs in West Africa, within the Upper-Guinean forests.
