= Trichostachys =

Scientific classification
- Kingdom: Plantae
- Clade: Tracheophytes
- Clade: Angiosperms
- Clade: Eudicots
- Clade: Asterids
- Order: Gentianales
- Family: Rubiaceae
- Subfamily: Rubioideae
- Tribe: Lasiantheae
- Genus: Trichostachys; Hook.f.

Genus of flowering plants

Trichostachys is a genus of plant in the family Rubiaceae. It contains the following species:

- Trichostachys interrupta K.Schum.
