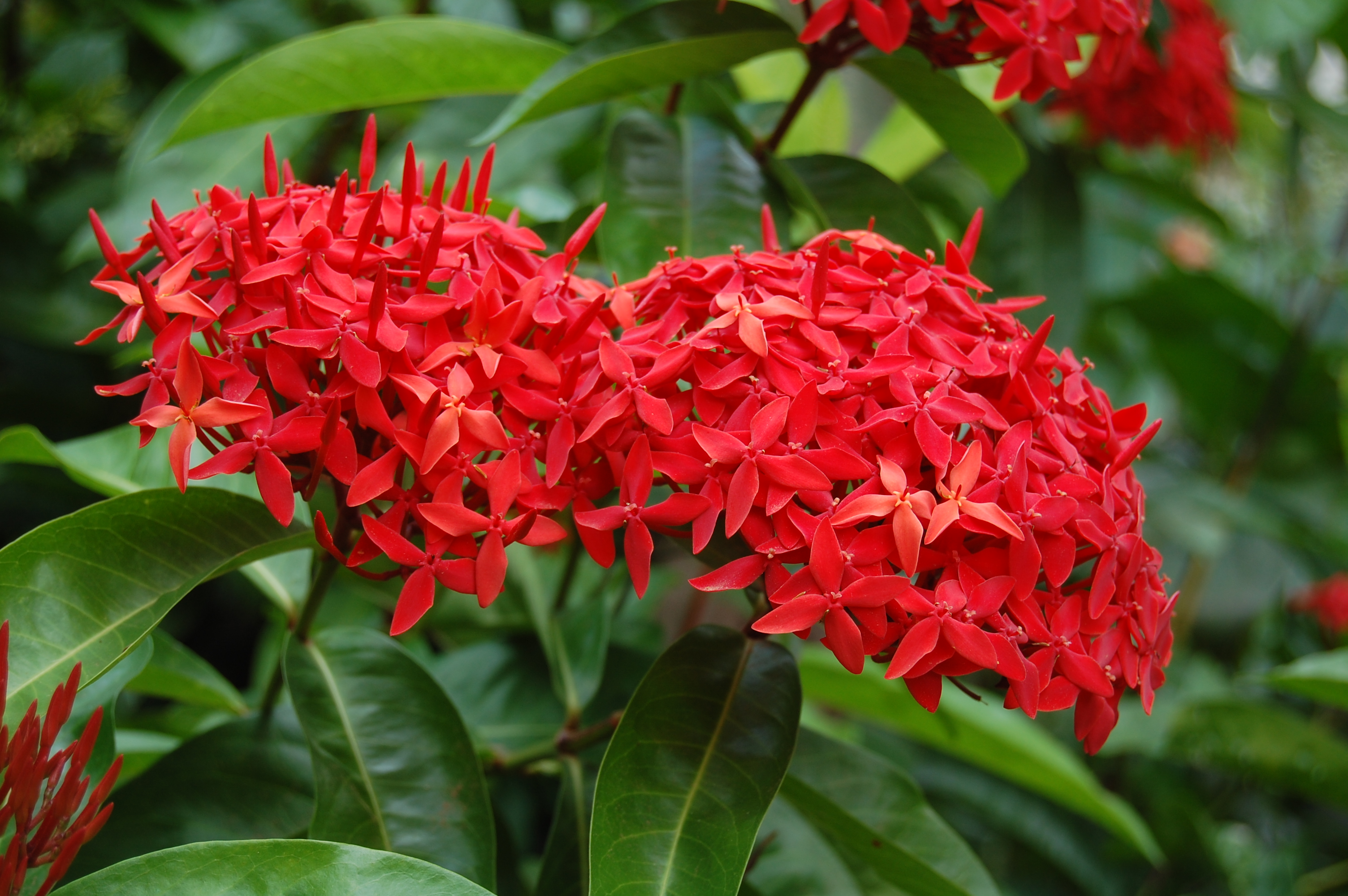

Scientific classification
- Kingdom: Plantae
- Clade: Tracheophytes
- Clade: Angiosperms
- Clade: Eudicots
- Clade: Asterids
- Order: Gentianales
- Family: Rubiaceae
- Genus: Ixora
- Species: I. casei

Binomial name
- Ixora casei Hance

= Ixora casei =

Species of flowering plant

Ixora casei, known as the giant red ixora, is a species of flowering plant in the family Rubiaceae.

== Description ==
The species is endemic to the Marshall Islands, Mariana Islands, Caroline Islands and Gilbert Islands. The species has subsequently been introduced to Colombia, the Cook Islands, the Line Islands, and Trinidad and Tobago.

Three varieties are accepted:

- Ixora casei var. casei Hance
- Ixora casei var. medialoba Fosberg & Sachet
- Ixora casei var. lanceolata (Kaneh.) Fosberg & Sachet
