= Ixora scheffleri =

Conservation status
- Least Concern (IUCN 3.1)

Scientific classification
- Kingdom: Plantae
- Clade: Tracheophytes
- Clade: Angiosperms
- Clade: Eudicots
- Clade: Asterids
- Order: Gentianales
- Family: Rubiaceae
- Genus: Ixora
- Species: I. scheffleri

Binomial name
- Ixora scheffleri K.Schum. & K.Krause

Species of plant

Ixora scheffleri is small to medium-sized tree species within the family Rubiaceae. It is among four Ixora species occurring in Africa than has a predominant tree habit. It has two infraspecifics, one of which is endangered, the Ixora scheffleri subsp. keniensis.

== Description ==
Ixora scheffleri grows up to 17 m in height, the bark is brown to grey in color and the slash is soft and fibrous, pale pink to brownish in color. Leaves tend to be glabrous, simple, and opposite with stipules and petioles present; leaflets are elliptic to oblong in outline. Inflorescence is corymbose in arrangement, sessile and pedunculate, peduncle reaches up to 10 cm long, flowers are white in color with pink spots on the corolla tube.

== Subspecies ==
- Ixora scheffleri subsp. keniensis
- Ixora scheffleri subsp. scheffleri

== Distribution ==
The species is endemic to Eastern Africa from Uganda southwards to Tanzania. It occurs in montane regions along the Eastern arc mountains in Uluguru, Mulanje, Imatongs and Usambara mountain ranges.

== Uses ==
The species is used as an ornamental plant.
