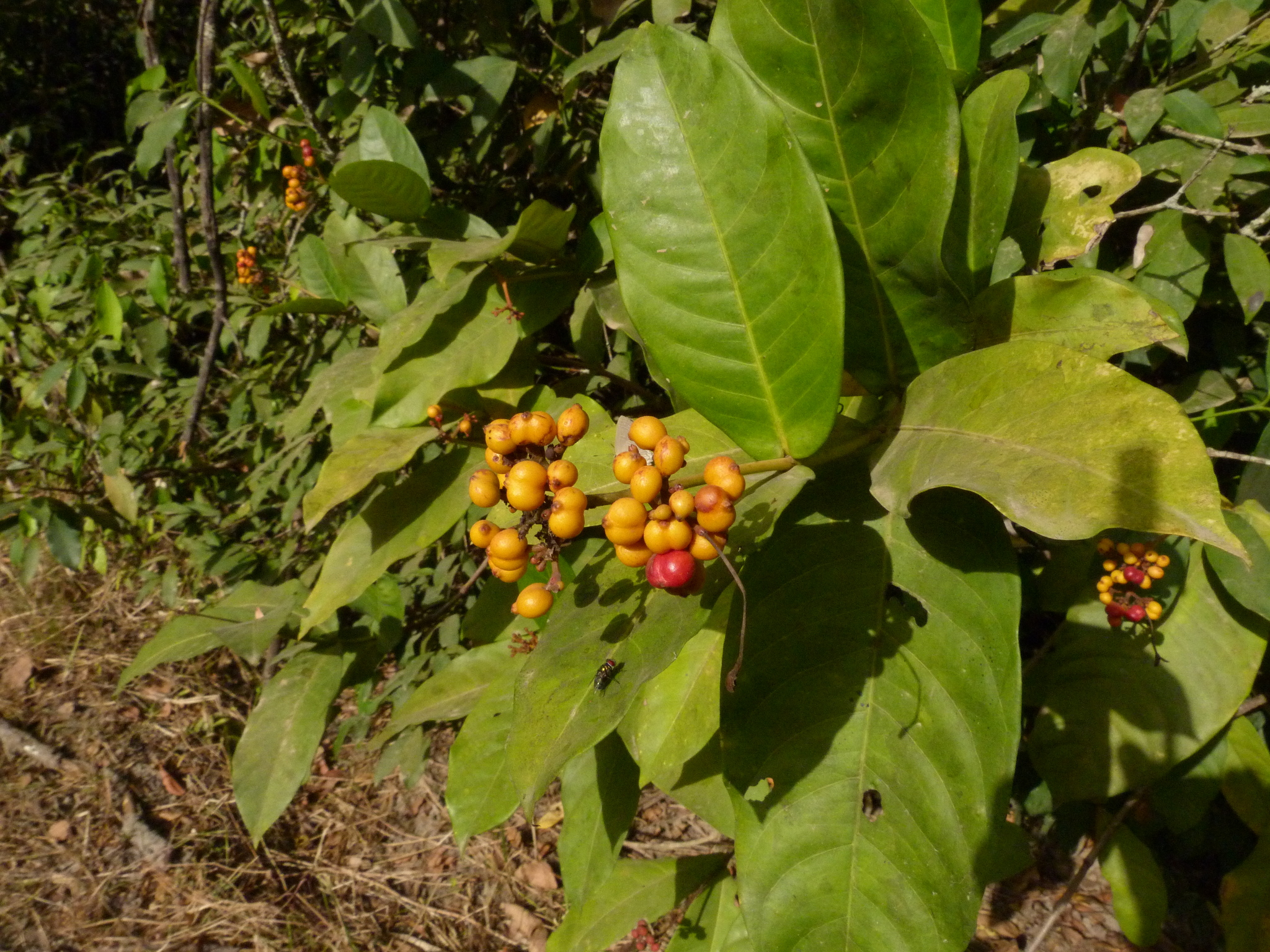

Scientific classification
- Kingdom: Plantae
- Clade: Tracheophytes
- Clade: Angiosperms
- Clade: Eudicots
- Clade: Asterids
- Order: Gentianales
- Family: Rubiaceae
- Genus: Ixora
- Species: I. brachypoda

Binomial name
- Ixora brachypoda DC.

= Ixora brachypoda =

Species of plant

Ixora brachypoda is a species of shrub or small tree in the family Rubiaceae. It has fragrant flowers and glabrous leaves and stems.

== Description ==
The species grows up to 6 m in height. The bark is brown with longitudinal scaly fissures and the slash has a yellow to whitish color. Leaves, sessile or subsessile with stipules and petioles present; stipules reaches up to 3 mm wide and 2 mm long while petiole reaches 2 mm long. Leaflets are elliptic to ovate in outline, up to 27 cm long and 14 cm wide with an acuminate apex and cuneate base. The inflorescence is corymbose and many flowered, sometimes with more than 200 flowers, corolla is tubular, white, sometimes tinged with pink. The fruit is globular in shape, up to 9 mm wide and 8 mm long, reddish black when ripe.

== Distribution ==
Occurs in West and Central Africa, from Guinea Bissau to the Democratic Republic of Congo. Found in gallery forests and along streams.

== Uses ==
In ethnomedicine, bark extracts of Ixora brachypoda are used in pain management, while root extracts are used as an antihelminthic and also to aid the healing process.
