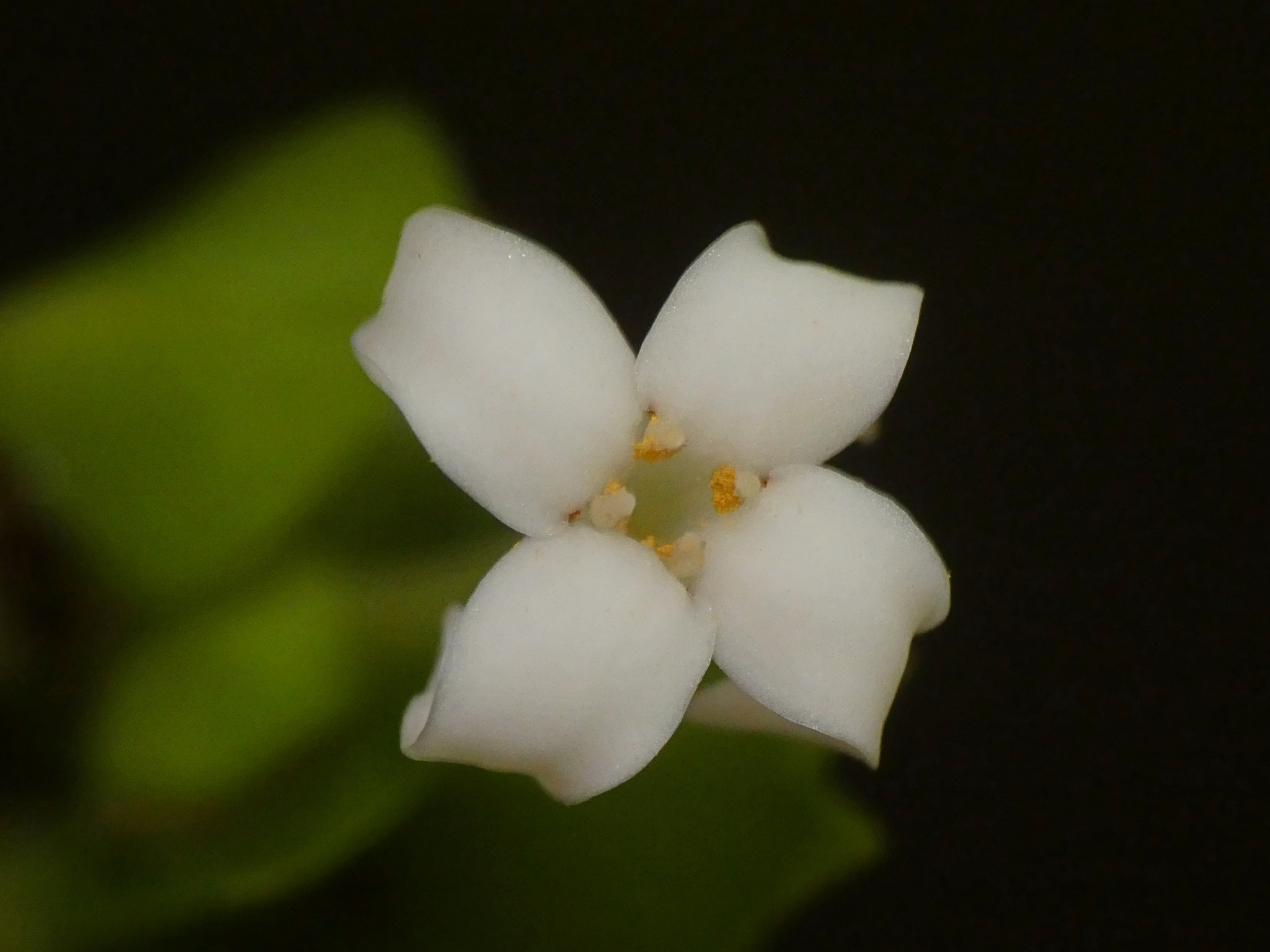
- Flower

Conservation status
- Least Concern (NCA)

Scientific classification
- Kingdom: Plantae
- Clade: Tracheophytes
- Clade: Angiosperms
- Clade: Eudicots
- Clade: Asterids
- Order: Gentianales
- Family: Rubiaceae
- Genus: Ixora
- Species: I. baileyana

Binomial name
- Ixora baileyana Bridson & L.G.Adams

Synonyms
- Lasianthus graciliflorus F.M.Bailey

= Ixora baileyana =

Species of flowering plant

Ixora baileyana is a species of flowering plant in the coffee and gardenia family Rubiaceae, first described in 1987. It is found only in the Wet Tropics bioregion of Queensland, Australia.

== Description ==
Ixora baileyana is a shrub to about 2 m (6 ft 7 in) tall with leaves that are either sessile (without a stem) or have very short petioles. There are interpetiolar stipules about 10 mm (0.4 in) long, and the leaves are generally broader towards the apex with an acute (pointed) tip and an obtuse (blunt) base. They can reach 20 cm (7.9 in) in length and 6 cm (2.4 in) in width, with between 9 and 14 pairs of lateral veins.

Small scented flowers are produced in clusters in the leaf axils and are more or less sessile. They are tubular and have four recurved lobes about 4 mm (0.16 in) long. They have four stamens, of which only the tips reach beyond the corolla lobes, and a slightly longer style. The ovary has four locules and the stigma has four spreading lobes.

The fruit are 4-locular drupes, red in colour, more or less spherical, and about 1 cm (0.4 in) diameter. The calyx persists at the apex of the fruit. They contain one pale brown seed per locule, measuring about 4 mm (0.16 in) long.

== Distribution and habitat ==
This plant is endemic to a small part of northeastern Queensland, where it grows as an understory plant in coastal and sub-coastal rainforests. It ranges from Cape Tribulation in the north to about Mission Beach in the south, at altitudes from sea level to about 450 m (1,480 ft).

== Conservation ==
This species is listed as least concern under the Queensland Government's Nature Conservation Act. As of 8 March 2025, it has not been assessed by the International Union for Conservation of Nature (IUCN).

== Gallery ==
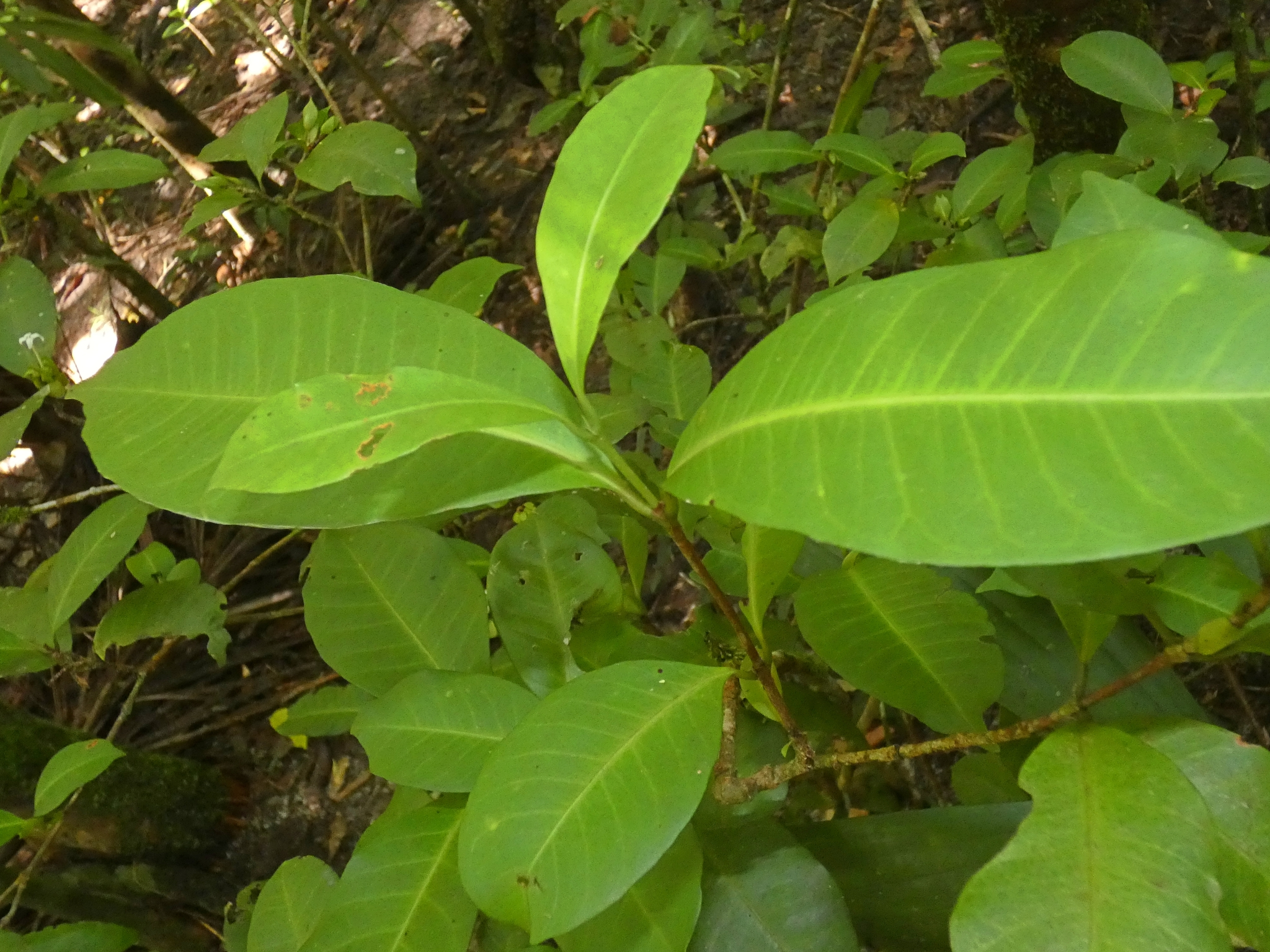
Foliage

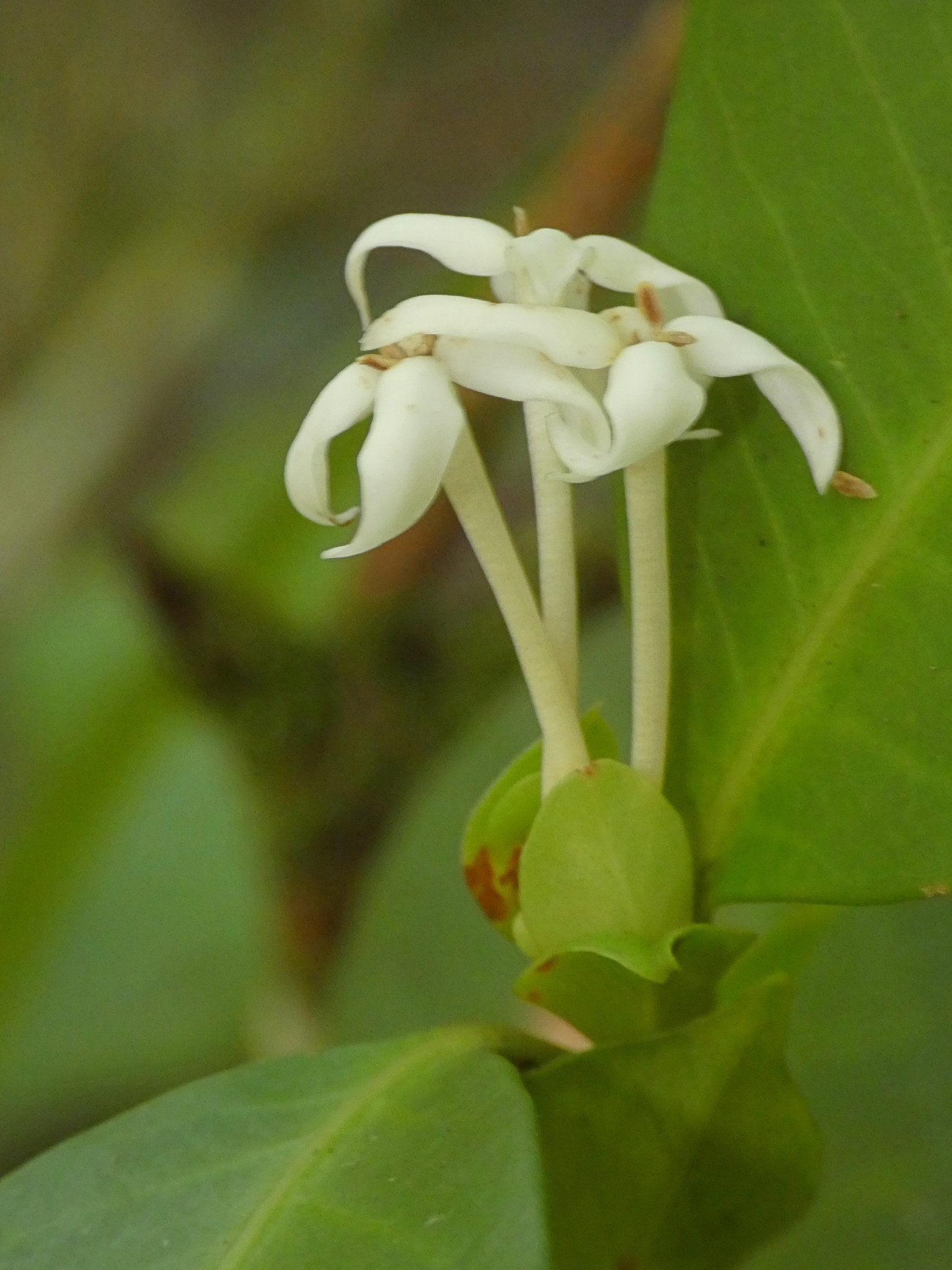
Flowers

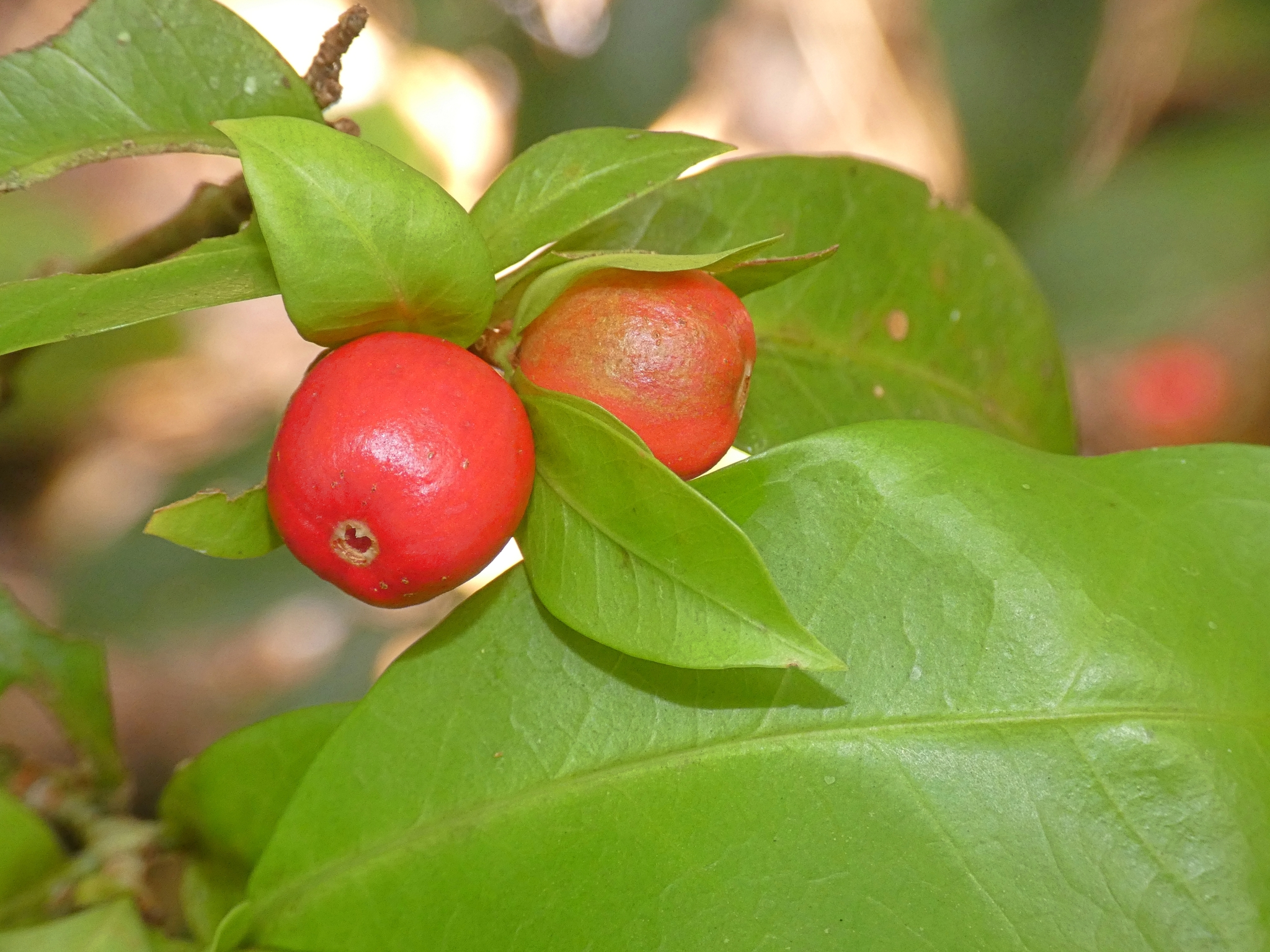
Ripe fruit

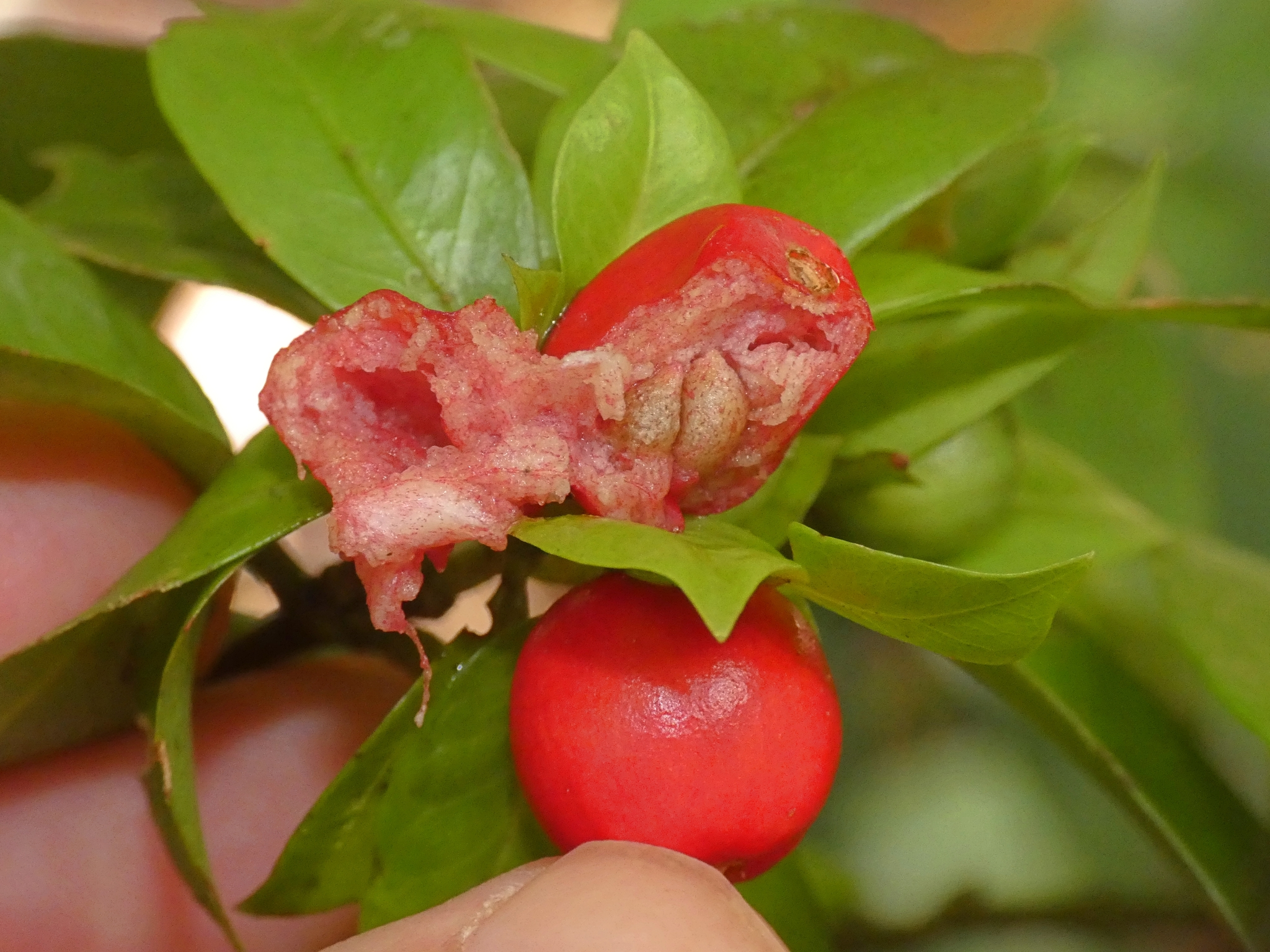
Fruit and seeds
