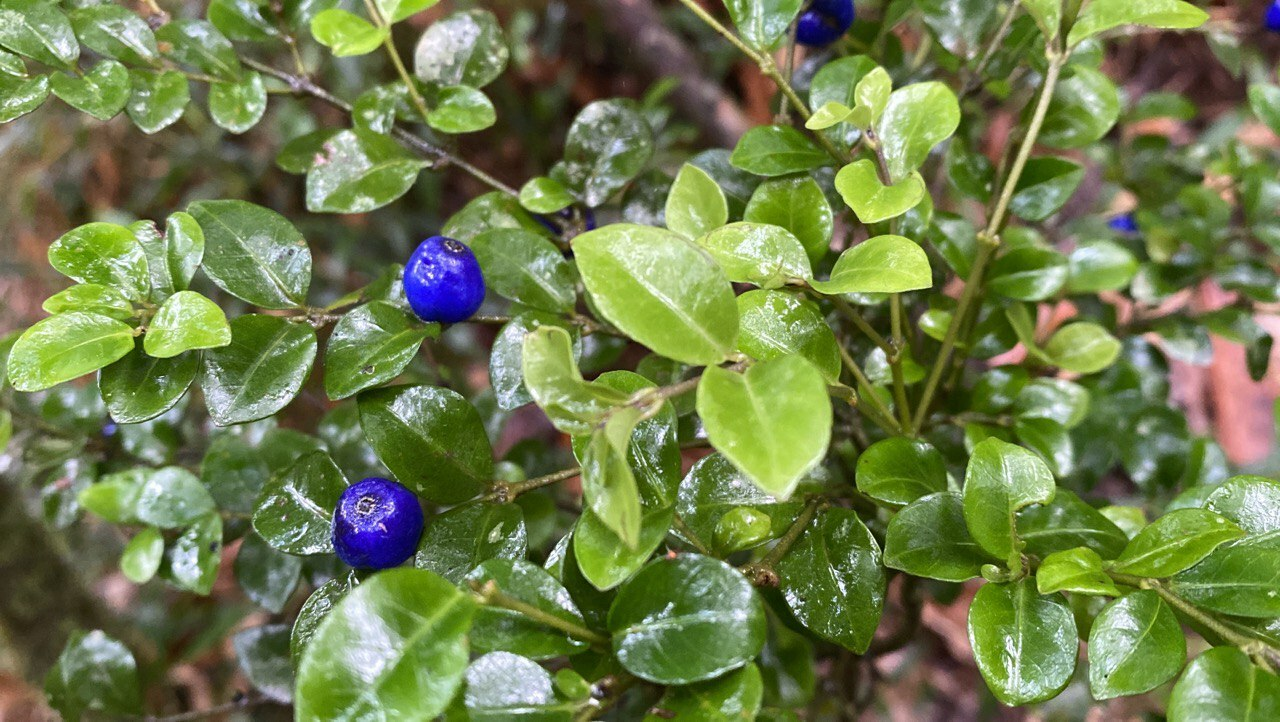
- Saldinia pycnophylla

Scientific classification
- Kingdom: Plantae
- Clade: Tracheophytes
- Clade: Angiosperms
- Clade: Eudicots
- Clade: Asterids
- Order: Gentianales
- Family: Rubiaceae
- Genus: Saldinia; A.Rich. ex DC.

= Saldinia =

Genus of plants

Saldinia is a genus of flowering plants belonging to the family Rubiaceae.

Its native range is Comoros and Madagascar.

== Species ==
Species:

- Saldinia acuminata Bremek.
- Saldinia aegialodes Bremek.
- Saldinia axillaris (Lam. ex Poir.) Bremek.
- Saldinia boiviniana (Baill.) Bremek.
- Saldinia bullata Bremek.
- Saldinia coursiana Bremek.
- Saldinia dasyclada Bremek.
- Saldinia hirsuta Bremek.
- Saldinia littoralis Bremek.
- Saldinia longistipulata Bremek.
- Saldinia mandracensis Bremek.
- Saldinia myrtilloides Bremek.
- Saldinia oblongifolia Bremek.
- Saldinia obovatifolia Bremek.
- Saldinia obtusata Bremek.
- Saldinia pallida Bremek.
- Saldinia phlebophylla Bremek.
- Saldinia platyclada Bremek.
- Saldinia proboscidea Hochr.
- Saldinia pycnophylla Bremek.
- Saldinia stenophylla Bremek.
- Saldinia subacuminata Bremek.
