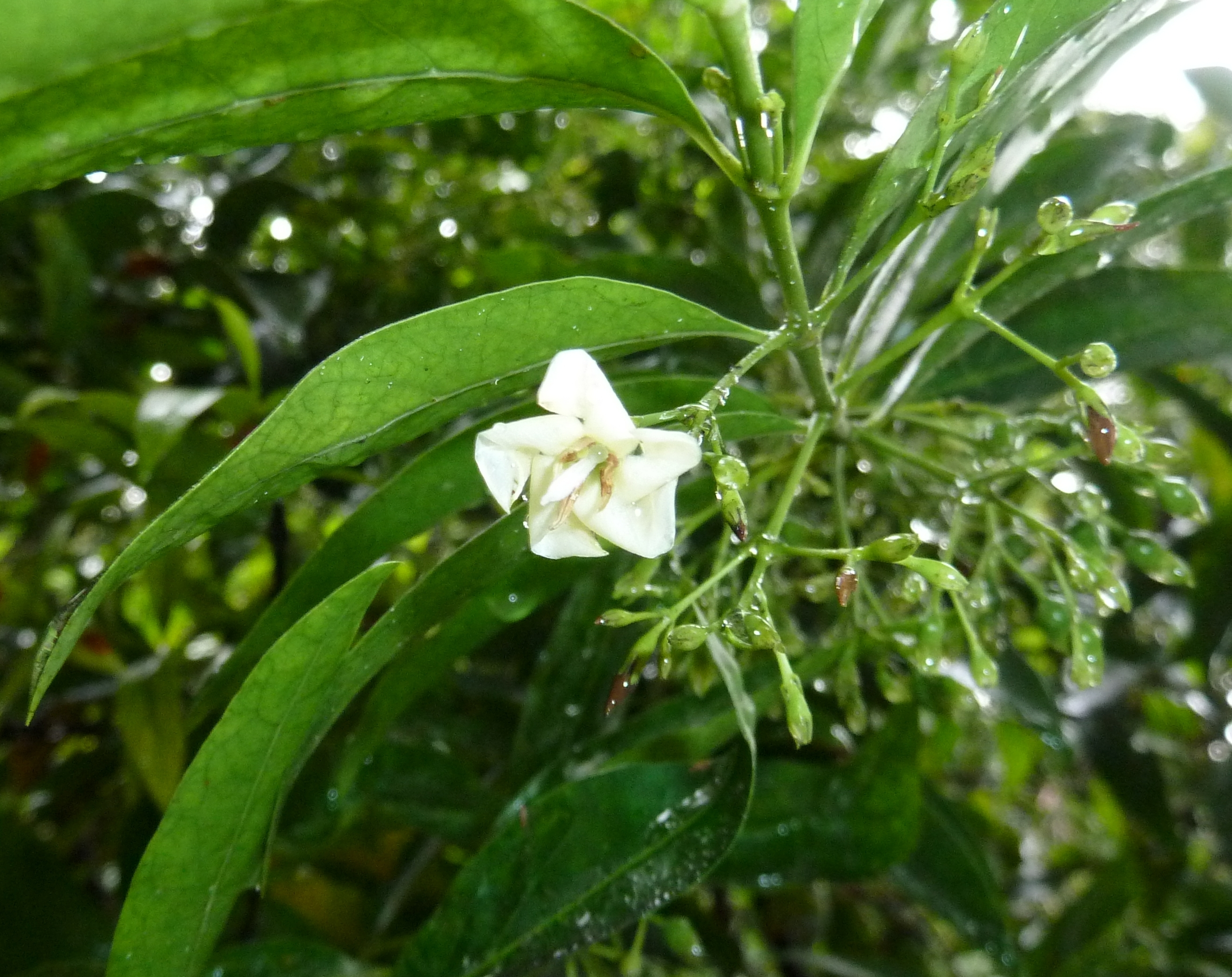
- Kraussia floribunda

Scientific classification
- Kingdom: Plantae
- Clade: Tracheophytes
- Clade: Angiosperms
- Clade: Eudicots
- Clade: Asterids
- Order: Gentianales
- Family: Rubiaceae
- Subfamily: Ixoroideae
- Tribe: Octotropideae; Bedd.

Type genus
- Octotropis Bedd.

= Octotropideae =

Tribe of plants

Octotropideae is a tribe of flowering plants in the family Rubiaceae and contains about 103 species in 18 genera. Its representatives are found in the paleotropics. The genera previously placed in the tribe Hypobathreae are now placed in Octotropideae.

== Genera ==
Currently accepted names

- Canephora Juss. (5 sp) - Madagascar
- Didymosalpinx Keay (5 sp) - Tropical Africa
- Feretia Delile (4 sp) - Tropical and Southern Africa
- Fernelia Comm. ex Lam. (4 sp) - Mascarene Islands
- Flagenium Baill. (6 sp) - Madagascar
- Galiniera Delile (2 sp) - Tropical Africa, Madagascar
- Hypobathrum Blume (31 sp) - Tropical Asia
- Jovetia Guédès (1 sp) - Madagascar
- Kraussia Harv. (4 sp) - Kenya, Tanzania, Mozambique, South Africa, Socotra
- Lamprothamnus Hiern (1 sp) - Somalia, Kenya, Tanzania
- Lemyrea (A.Chev.) A.Chev. & Beille (4 sp) - Madagascar
- Nargedia Bedd. (1 sp) - Sri Lanka
- Octotropis Bedd. (1 sp) - India
- Paragenipa Baill. (1 sp) - Seychelles
- Polysphaeria Hook.f. (22 sp) - Tropical Africa, Madagascar
- Pouchetia A.Rich. ex DC. (4 sp) - Western Tropical Africa to Sudan and Northern Angola
- Ramosmania Tirveng. & Verdc. (2 sp) - Rodrigues
- Villaria Rolfe (5 sp) - Philippines

Possibly placed here:

- Xantonneopsis Pit. (1 sp.) – Vietnam

Synonyms

- Exosolenia Baill. ex Drake = Lemyrea
- Higginsia Blume = Hypobathrum
- Petunga DC. = Hypobathrum
- Phylanthera Noronha = Hypobathrum
- Platymerium Bartl. ex DC. = Hypobathrum
- Ptychostigma Hochst. = Galiniera
- Rhabdostigma Hook.f. = Kraussia
- Spicillaria A.Rich. = Hypobathrum
