= Motandra =

Scientific classification
- Kingdom: Plantae
- Clade: Embryophytes
- Clade: Tracheophytes
- Clade: Spermatophytes
- Clade: Angiosperms
- Clade: Eudicots
- Clade: Asterids
- Order: Gentianales
- Family: Apocynaceae
- Subfamily: Apocynoideae
- Tribe: Baisseeae
- Genus: Motandra; A.DC.

Genus of plants

Motandra is a genus of plant in the family Apocynaceae native to tropical Africa. As of July 2026, Plants of the World Online accepts these species:

1. Motandra lujae De Wild. & T.Durand - Gabon, Republic of the Congo, Cabinda, Equatorial Guinea, Democratic Republic of the Congo
2. Motandra paniculata (Poir.) I.M.Turner - widespread from Liberia to Sudan and south to Angola
3. Motandra poecilophylla Wernham - Gabon, Republic of the Congo, Equatorial Guinea, Cameroon

Formerly included:

1. Motandra erlangeri K.Schum = Oncinotis tenuiloba Stapf
2. Motandra glabrata Baill. = Oncinotis glabrata (Baill.) Stapf ex Hiern
3. Motandra viridiflora K.Schum. = Baissea viridiflora (K.Schum.) de Kruif
4. Motandra welwitschiana Baill. = Oncinotis hirta Oliv.
