= Kupeantha =

Scientific classification
- Kingdom: Plantae
- Clade: Tracheophytes
- Clade: Angiosperms
- Clade: Eudicots
- Clade: Asterids
- Order: Gentianales
- Family: Rubiaceae
- Tribe: Coffeeae
- Genus: Kupeantha; Cheek

Type species
- Kupeantha kupensis Cheek & Sonké

Genus of angiosperm

Kupeantha is a genus of flowering plants in the family Rubiaceae. It is found in Cameroon and Equatorial Guinea. The genus is closely related to Argocoffeopsis and Calycosiphonia.

== Species ==
- Kupeantha ebo M.G.Alvarez & Cheek
- Kupeantha fosimondi (Tchiengué & Cheek) Cheek
- Kupeantha kupensis Cheek & Sonké
- Kupeantha pentamera (Sonké & Robbr.) Cheek
- Kupeantha spathulata (A.P.Davis & Sonké) Cheek
- Kupeantha yabassi M.G.Alvarez & Cheek
