= Xantonneopsis =

Scientific classification
- Kingdom: Plantae
- Clade: Tracheophytes
- Clade: Angiosperms
- Clade: Eudicots
- Clade: Asterids
- Order: Gentianales
- Family: Rubiaceae
- Subfamily: Ixoroideae
- Tribe: Octotropideae (?)
- Genus: Xantonneopsis; Pit.
- Species: X. robinsonii

Binomial name
- Xantonneopsis robinsonii Pit.

Genus of flowering plants

Xantonneopsis is a genus of plants in the family Rubiaceae. It contains only one known species, Xantonneopsis robinsonii, native to Vietnam. The genus has been placed in the tribe Coffeeae, but a transfer from that tribe to Octotropideae was suggested in 2007 on the basis of combined molecular and morphological evidence.
