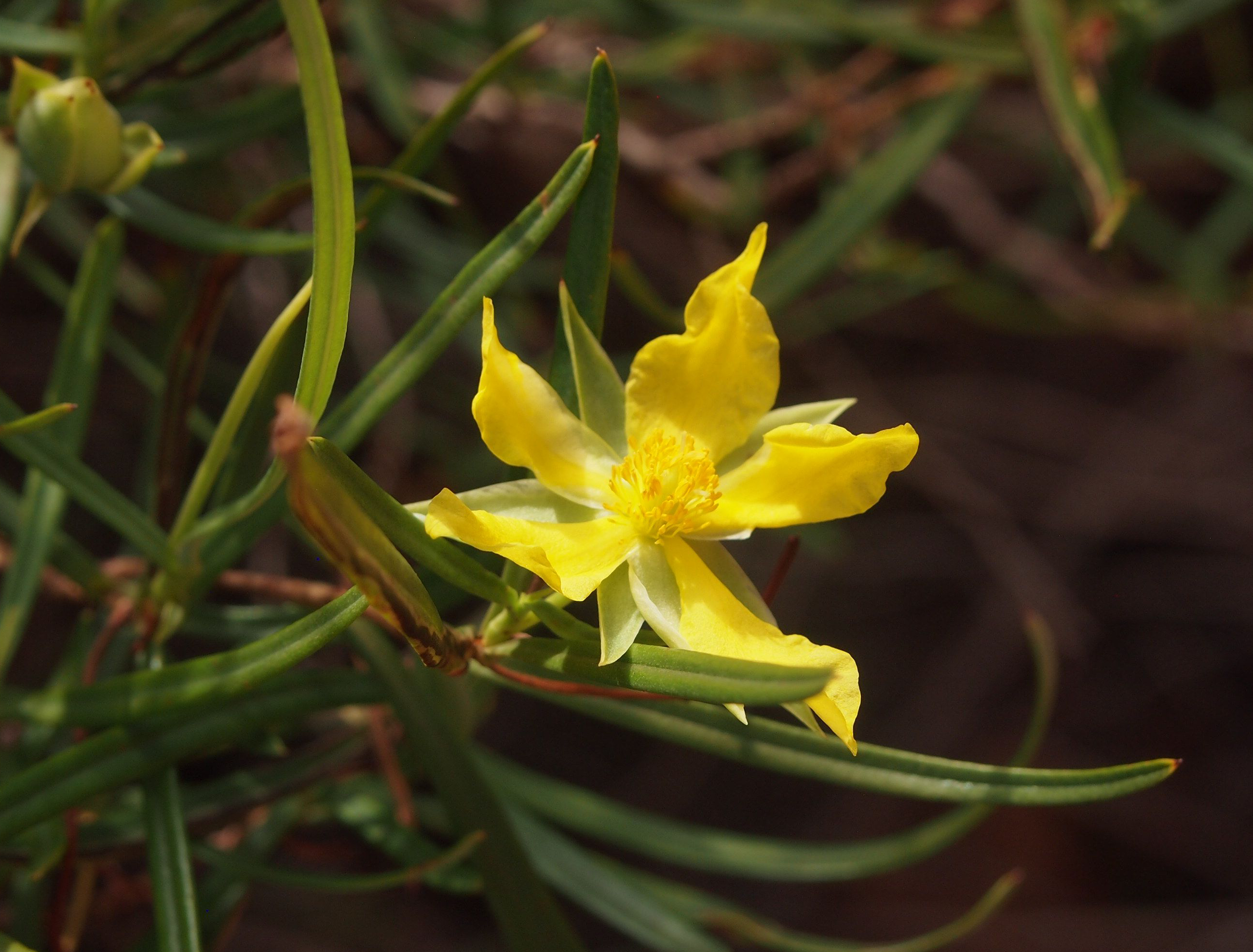
- At Kata Tjuta

Scientific classification
- Kingdom: Plantae
- Clade: Tracheophytes
- Clade: Angiosperms
- Clade: Eudicots
- Order: Dilleniales
- Family: Dilleniaceae
- Genus: Hibbertia
- Species: H. glaberrima

Binomial name
- Hibbertia glaberrima F.Muell.

Synonyms
- Hibbertia ferdinandi-muelleri T.Durand & B.D.Jacks. orth. var.; Hibbertia muelleri-ferdinandi Gilg nom. illeg.

= Hibbertia glaberrima =

Species of flowering plant

Hibbertia glaberrima is a species of flowering plant in the family Dilleniaceae and is endemic to Central Australia. It is a glabrous, spreading shrub with oblong to lance-shaped leaves and yellow flowers borne singly in upper leaf axils, with 30 to 150 stamens arranged around three carpels.

== Description ==
Hibbertia glaberrima is a glabrous, spreading shrub that typically grows to a height of 0.5–2 m (1 ft 8 in – 6 ft 7 in). The leaves are linear-oblong to lance-shaped, mostly 30–100 mm (1.2–3.9 in) long and 2–12 mm (0.079–0.472 in) wide. The flowers are arranged singly in leaf axils on a peduncle 10–30 mm (0.39–1.18 in) long, with a linear, leaf-like bract at the base of the sepal tube. The sepals are egg-shaped, 15–18 mm (0.59–0.71 in) long and the petals are bright yellow. There are 30 to 150 stamens arranged around the three glabrous carpels, each carpel with six to nine ovules. Flowering occurs in most months with a peak from July to September.

== Taxonomy ==
Hibbertia glaberrima was first formally described in 1862 by Ferdinand von Mueller in Fragmenta phytographiae Australiae. The specific epithet (glaberrima) means "wholly glabrous".

== Distribution and habitat ==
Hibbertia glaberrima grows on rocky or gravelly ranges in the Pilbara biogeographic region of Western Australia, the far north-west of South Australia and in the southern part of the Northern Territory.

== Conservation status ==
Hibbertia glaberrima is listed as "not threatened" by the Government of Western Australia Department of Parks and Wildlife.
