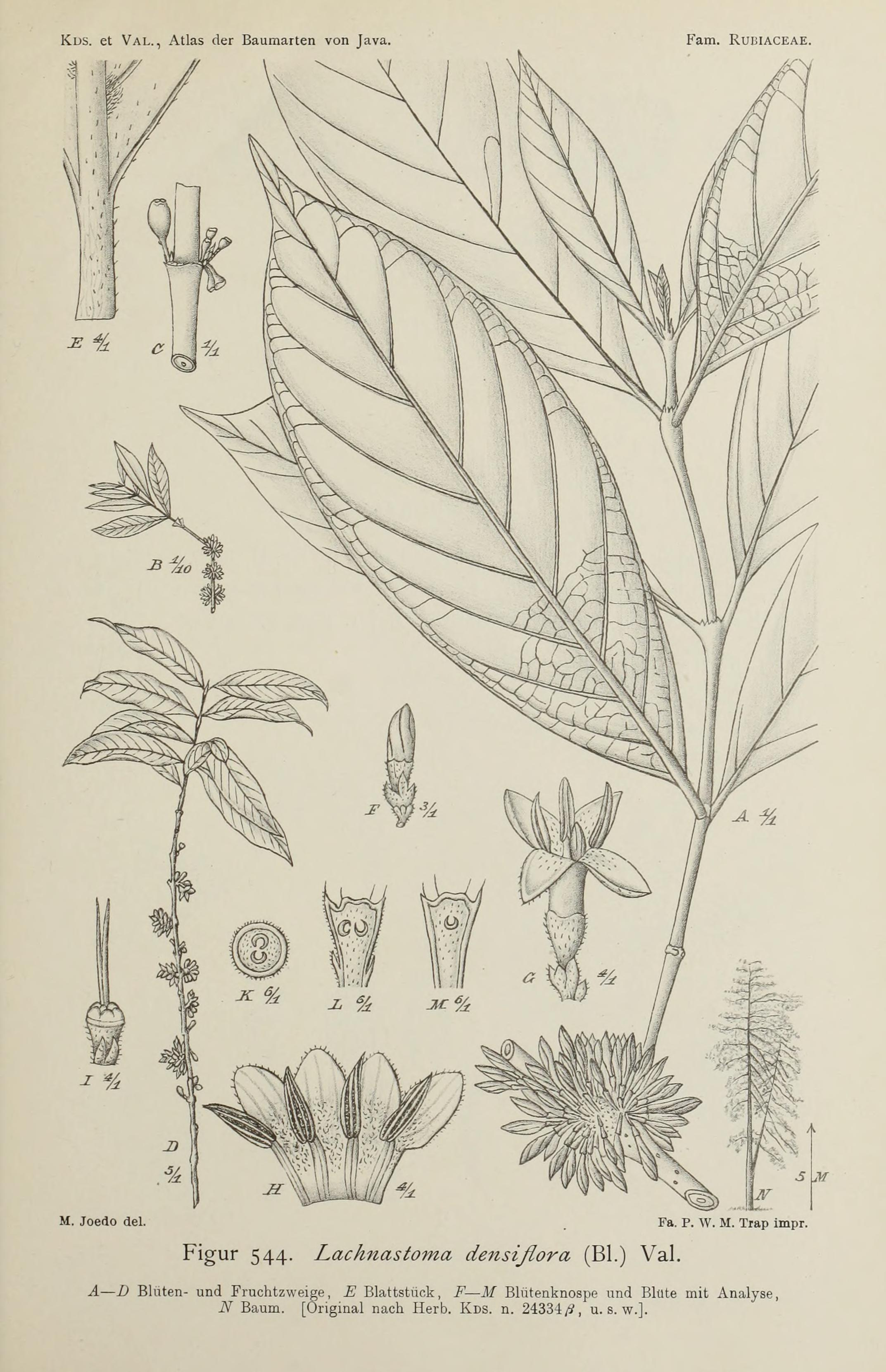
- Nostolachma densiflora

Scientific classification
- Kingdom: Plantae
- Clade: Tracheophytes
- Clade: Angiosperms
- Clade: Eudicots
- Clade: Asterids
- Order: Gentianales
- Family: Rubiaceae
- Tribe: Coffeeae
- Genus: Nostolachma; T.Durand

Synonyms
- Hymendocarpum Pierre ex Pit.; Lachnastoma Korth.

= Nostolachma =

Genus of plants

Nostolachma is a genus of flowering plants in the family Rubiaceae. It is found in South Asia and Southeast Asia.

== Species ==
- Nostolachma crassifolia (Gamble) Deb & Lahiri
- Nostolachma densiflora (Blume) Bakh.f.
- Nostolachma jenkinsii (Hook.f.) Deb & Lahiri
- Nostolachma odorata (Pierre ex Pit.) J.-F.Leroy
- Nostolachma triflorum (Korth.) R.Kr.Singh
- Nostolachma viridiflora (Ridl.) J.-F.Leroy ex A.P.Davis
