= Baissea axillaris =

Scientific classification
- Kingdom: Plantae
- Clade: Tracheophytes
- Clade: Angiosperms
- Clade: Eudicots
- Clade: Asterids
- Order: Gentianales
- Family: Apocynaceae
- Genus: Baissea
- Species: B. axillaris

Binomial name
- Baissea axillaris (Benth.) Hua

Synonyms
- Guerkea schumanniana De Wild. & T.Durand; Zygodia axillaris Benth.

Species of plant

Baissea axillaris is a plant in the family Apocynaceae.

== Description ==
Baissea axillaris is a climbing shrub that intertwines into the surrounding vegetation for support. It grows up to 15 metres (50 ft) long, with a trunk diameter of up to 12 cm (5 in). Its flowers feature a yellow, orange or white corolla, sometimes with red spots or stripes inside. Local traditional medicinal uses include as a treatment for kidney problems and colic and as a diuretic.

== Distribution and habitat ==
Baissea axillaris is native to an area of tropical Africa from Senegal east and south to Angola. Its habitat is in forests from sea level to 1,000 metres (3,300 ft) altitude.
