= Galiniera =

Scientific classification
- Kingdom: Plantae
- Clade: Tracheophytes
- Clade: Angiosperms
- Clade: Eudicots
- Clade: Asterids
- Order: Gentianales
- Family: Rubiaceae
- Subfamily: Ixoroideae
- Tribe: Octotropideae
- Genus: Galiniera; Delile

Synonyms
- Ptychostigma Hochst.

Genus of plants

Galiniera is a genus of flowering plants in the family Rubiaceae. The genus is found in tropical Africa and Madagascar.

== Species ==
- Galiniera myrtoides Homolle
- Galiniera saxifraga (Hochst.) Bridson
