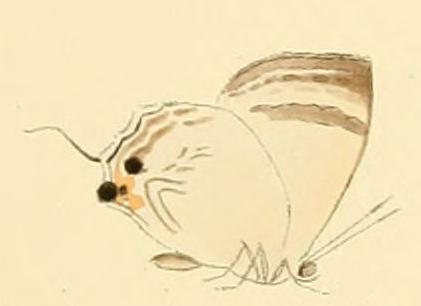

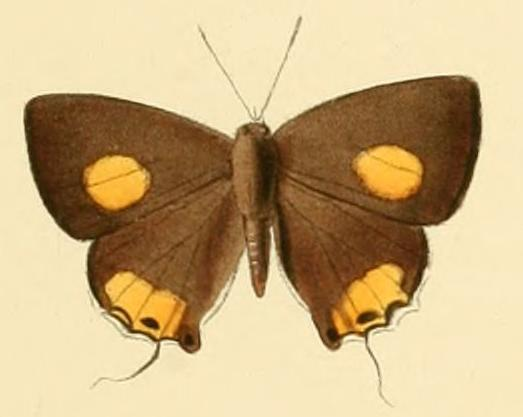

Scientific classification
- Kingdom: Animalia
- Phylum: Arthropoda
- Clade: Pancrustacea
- Class: Insecta
- Order: Lepidoptera
- Family: Lycaenidae
- Genus: Deudorix
- Species: D. lorisona

Binomial name
- Deudorix lorisona (Hewitson, 1862)

Synonyms
- Myrina lorisona Hewitson, 1862; Deudorix (Virachola) lorisona; Myrina bimaculata Hewitson, 1874; Deudorix alticola Aurivillius, 1923; Deudorix lorisona f. obliterata Hawker-Smith, 1928; Deudorix lorisona f. unimaculata Hawker-Smith, 1928; Deudorix lorisona f. albifrons Stempffer, 1948; Deudorix baronica Ungemach, 1932

= Deudorix lorisona =

Coffee playboy

Species of butterfly

Deudorix lorisona, the coffee playboy, is a butterfly in the family Lycaenidae. It is found in Senegal, the Gambia, Guinea-Bissau, Guinea, Sierra Leone, Burkina Faso, Liberia, Ivory Coast, Ghana, Togo, Nigeria, Cameroon, Equatorial Guinea, São Tomé and Príncipe, Gabon, the Republic of the Congo, the Central African Republic, the Democratic Republic of the Congo, Sudan, Uganda, Ethiopia, Kenya, Burundi, Tanzania, Malawi, Zambia, Mozambique and Zimbabwe. The habitat consists of dense savanna and forests.

Adults are attracted to the flowers of Eupatorium species and adult males mud puddle. Adults are on wing year round, with a peak from April to August.

The larvae feed on Galiniera saxifraga, Mussaenda arcuata, Rothmannia fischeri, Keetia, Rutidea and Coffea species. It is considered a minor pest on cultivated coffee.

== Subspecies ==
- D. l. lorisona (Guinea, Sierra Leone, Burkina Faso, Liberia, Ivory Coast, Ghana, Togo, Nigeria: south and the Cross River loop, Cameroon, Equatorial Guinea, São Tomé and Príncipe: Principe, Gabon, Congo, Central African Republic, Uganda, Kenya: west of the Rift Valley, western Tanzania, Democratic Republic of the Congo: Uele, Tshopo, Equateur, Kinshasa, Sankuru, Lualaba and Shaba)
- D. l. abriana Libert, 2004 (Senegal: Basse Casamance, Gambia, Guinea-Bissau, Guinea: Fouta Djalon)
- D. l. baronica Ungemach, 1932 (Sudan, south-western Ethiopia, eastern Uganda, north-western Kenya, north-western Tanzania, north-eastern Democratic Republic of the Congo, Burundi)
- D. l. coffea Jackson, 1966 (Kenya: east of the Rift Valley, Tanzania, Malawi, Zambia, Mozambique, Zimbabwe)
- D. l. sesse Stempffer & Jackson, 1962 (Uganda: Sesse Isles, Lake Victoria)

Torben Larsen developed a species numbering system for his 2005 publication Butterflies of West Africa. The nominate subspecies is #496. The 'Larsen' numbers have since been used with permission in A Sharp Eye on Butterflies of Ghana.
