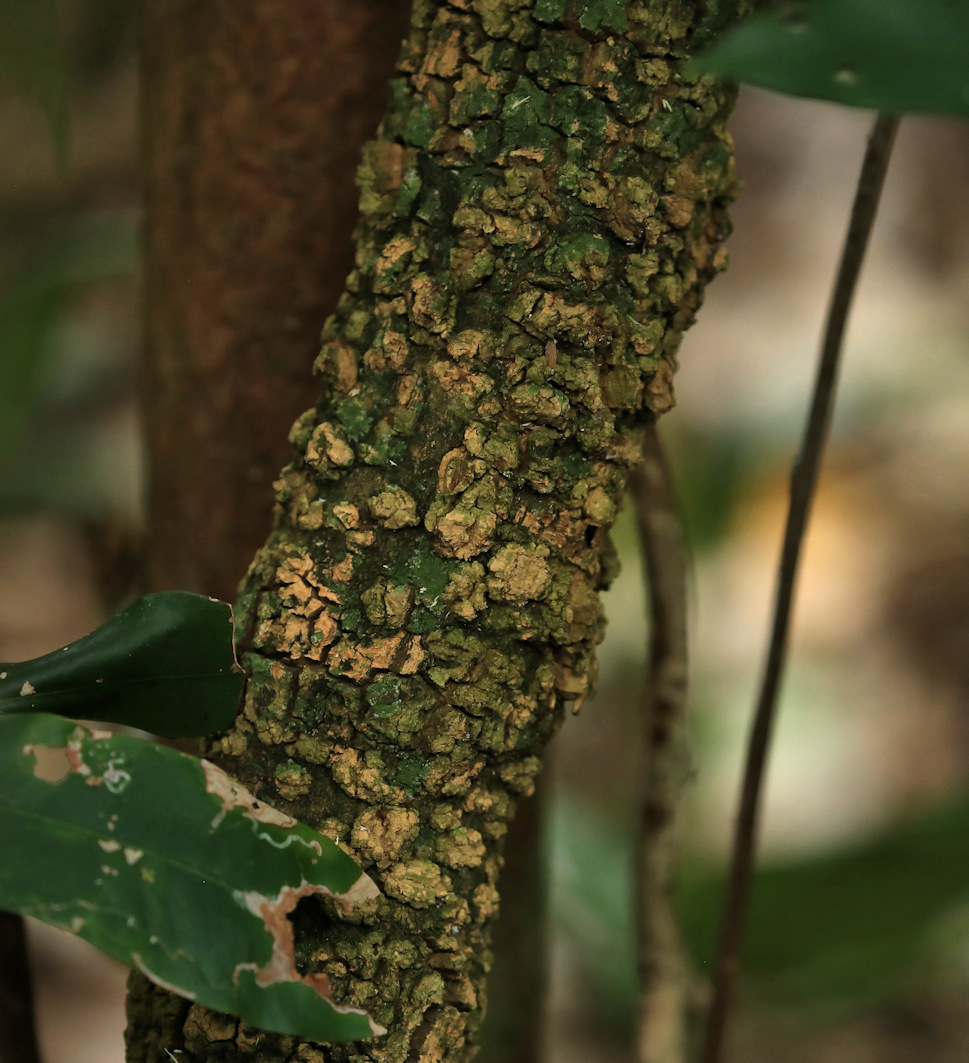
- Oncinotis tenuiloba

Scientific classification
- Kingdom: Plantae
- Clade: Embryophytes
- Clade: Tracheophytes
- Clade: Spermatophytes
- Clade: Angiosperms
- Clade: Eudicots
- Clade: Asterids
- Order: Gentianales
- Family: Apocynaceae
- Subfamily: Apocynoideae
- Tribe: Baisseeae
- Genus: Oncinotis; Benth.

= Oncinotis =

Genus of plants

Oncinotis is a genus of plant in the family Apocynaceae, first described in 1849. It is native to Africa, including Madagascar. As of July 2026, Plants of the World Online accepts these species:

- Oncinotis gabonica O.Lachenaud – Gabon
- Oncinotis glabrata (Baill.) Stapf ex Hiern – tropical Africa from Liberia to Tanzania, south to Angola
- Oncinotis gracilis Stapf – tropical Africa from Liberia to Central African Republic, south to Angola
- Oncinotis hirta Oliv. – Central Africa from Cameroon to Angola
- Oncinotis nitida Benth. – West Africa from Liberia to Republic of the Congo
- Oncinotis pontyi Dubard – tropical Africa from Guinea to Uganda
- Oncinotis tenuiloba Stapf – Central and Southern Africa from Nigeria east to Sudan and Ethiopia, south to Cape Province
- Oncinotis tomentella Radlk. – Madagascar

formerly included

1. Oncinotis axillaris K.Schum. = Baissea multiflora A.DC.
2. Oncinotis campanulata K.Schum = Baissea campanulata (K.Schum.) de Kruif
3. Oncinotis melanocephala K.Schum. = Baissea myrtifolia (Benth.) Pichon
4. Oncinotis subsessilis K.Schum. = Baissea campanulata (K.Schum.) de Kruif
5. Oncinotis zygodioides K.Schum. = Baissea zygodioides (K.Schum.) Stapf
