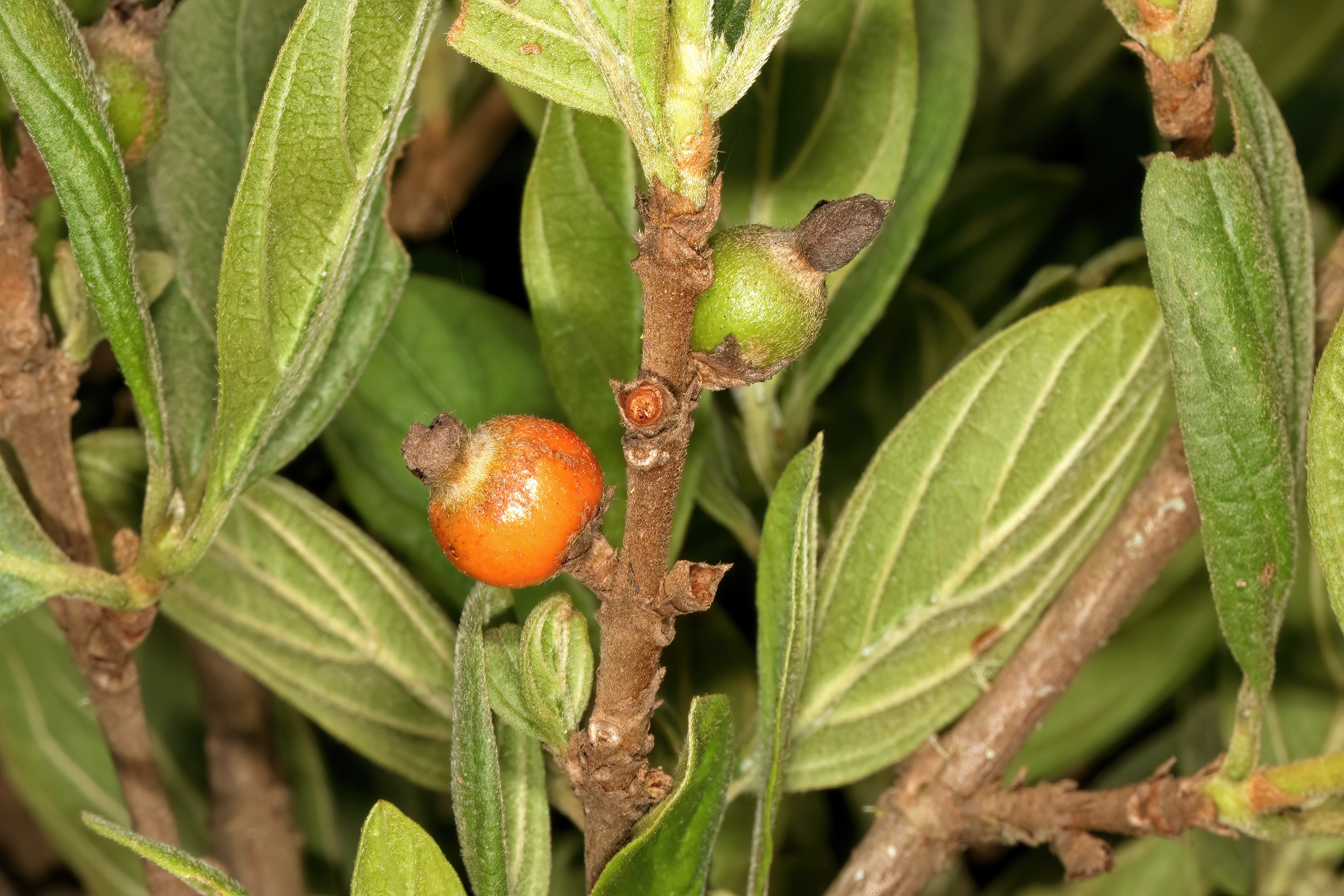
- Sericanthe andongensis subsp. legatii

Scientific classification
- Kingdom: Plantae
- Clade: Tracheophytes
- Clade: Angiosperms
- Clade: Eudicots
- Clade: Asterids
- Order: Gentianales
- Family: Rubiaceae
- Subfamily: Ixoroideae
- Tribe: Coffeeae
- Genus: Sericanthe; Robbr.

Type species
- Sericanthe odoratissima (K.Schum.) Robbr.

= Sericanthe =

Genus of plants

Sericanthe is a genus of flowering plants in the family Rubiaceae. It is found in tropical and subtropical Africa. The genus was described by Elmar Robbrecht in 1978 based on the species in Neorosea, except for the type species, Neorosea jasminiflora, which went to Tricalysia. Bacterial leaf nodules are found in most of the species and the endophytic bacteria have been identified as Burkholderia.

== Species ==
- Sericanthe adamii (N.Hallé) Robbr.
- Sericanthe andongensis (Hiern) Robbr.
- Sericanthe auriculata (Keay) Robbr.
- Sericanthe burundensis Robbr.
- Sericanthe chevalieri (K.Krause) Robbr.
- Sericanthe chimanimaniensis Wursten & De Block
- Sericanthe gabonensis Sonké & Robbr.
- Sericanthe halleana Robbr.
- Sericanthe jacfelicis (N.Hallé) Robbr.
- Sericanthe leonardii (N.Hallé) Robbr.
- Sericanthe lowryana Sonké & Robbr.
- Sericanthe mpassa Sonké & Robbr.
- Sericanthe odoratissima (K.Schum.) Robbr.
- Sericanthe pellegrinii (N.Hallé) Robbr.
- Sericanthe petitii (N.Hallé) Robbr.
- Sericanthe rabia Sonké & Robbr.
- Sericanthe raynaliorum (N.Hallé) Robbr.
- Sericanthe roseoides (De Wild. & T.Durand) Robbr.
- Sericanthe suffruticosa (Hutch.) Robbr.
- Sericanthe testui (N.Hallé) Robbr.
- Sericanthe toupetou (Aubrév. & Pellegr.) Robbr.
- Sericanthe trilocularis (Scott Elliot) Robbr.
