= Feretia =

Scientific classification
- Kingdom: Plantae
- Clade: Tracheophytes
- Clade: Angiosperms
- Clade: Eudicots
- Clade: Asterids
- Order: Gentianales
- Family: Rubiaceae
- Subfamily: Ixoroideae
- Tribe: Octotropideae
- Genus: Feretia; Delile

Type species
- Feretia apodanthera Delile

Genus of plants

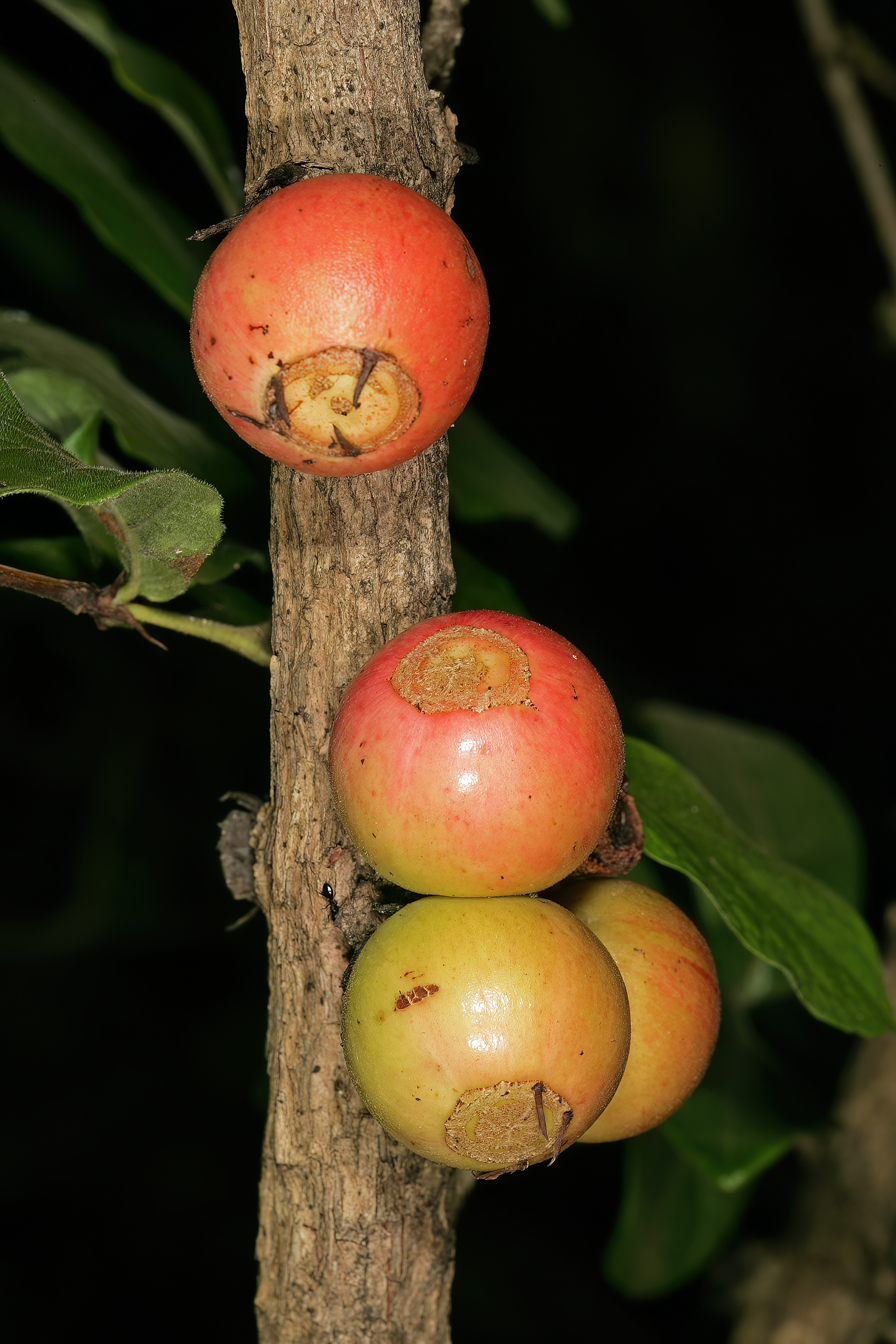
Feretia aeruginescens, fruit; plants cauliflorous, with flowers and fruit borne mainly on older stems. Lowveld National Botanical Garden, Nelspruit, Mpumalanga, South Africa

Feretia is a genus of flowering plants in the family Rubiaceae. The genus is found in tropical and southern Africa.

== Species ==
- Feretia aeruginescens Stapf
- Feretia apodanthera Delile
- Feretia virgata K.Schum.
