= Discospermum reyesii =

Scientific classification
- Kingdom: Plantae
- Clade: Tracheophytes
- Clade: Angiosperms
- Clade: Eudicots
- Clade: Asterids
- Order: Gentianales
- Family: Rubiaceae
- Subfamily: Ixoroideae
- Tribe: Coffeeae
- Genus: Discospermum
- Species: D. reyesii

Binomial name
- Discospermum reyesii Arriola, Valdez & Alejandro (2018)

Species of plant

Discospermum reyesii is a species of flowering plant in the family Rubiaceae. The species was described in 2018, and was found on Mount Lantoy, Cebu Province, Philippines. This species closely resemble that of D. whitfordii because of slightly similar leaf blades, leaf apices, and non-ribbed fruits. However, the species differs from D. whitfordii due to its smaller fruits with size of 1 - 1.2 cm, smaller seed size to 1 - 1.4 mm x 1.5 - 2.5 mm dimensions, 4 - 6 seeds per locule, whereas D. whitfordii have 2 - 2.7 cm fruit size, 5 - 6.5 mm x 5 - 6.5(7) mm seed size, and 5 - 12 seeds per locule.

== Etymology ==
The species was named after the Far Eastern University's first President and founding chairman Dr. Nicanor Reyes Sr.
