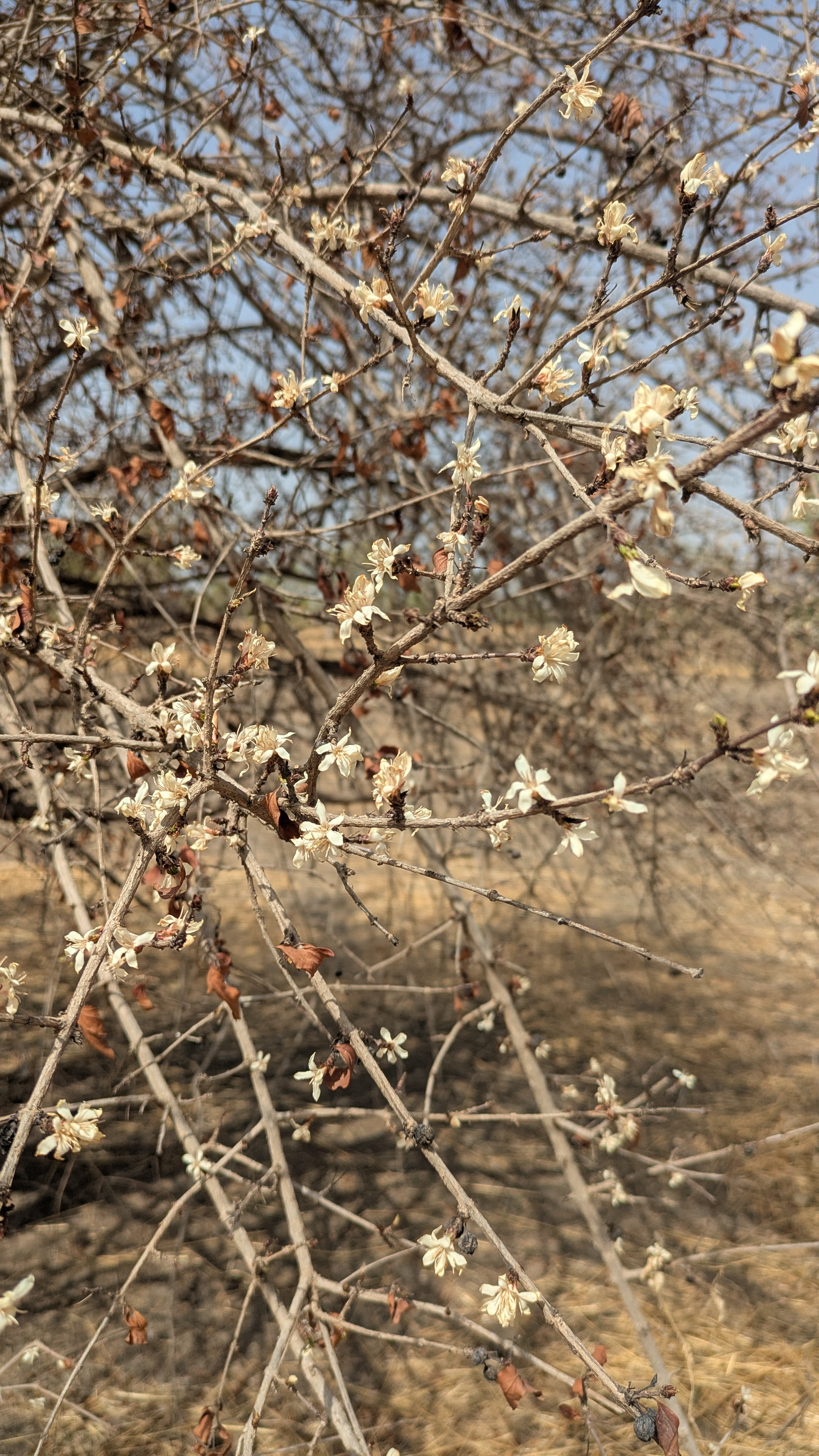

Scientific classification
- Kingdom: Plantae
- Clade: Tracheophytes
- Clade: Angiosperms
- Clade: Eudicots
- Clade: Asterids
- Order: Gentianales
- Family: Rubiaceae
- Genus: Feretia
- Species: F. apodanthera

Binomial name
- Feretia apodanthera Delile (1843)

Synonyms
- Canthium ellipticum Hochst.; Pavetta elliptica Hochst.

= Feretia apodanthera =

Species of tree in the family Rubiaceae

Feretia apodanthera is a species of tree in the family Rubiaceae. It was first described by Delile in 1843.

== Description ==
It has simple, broad leaves. It grows to approximately 15 feet, and has a self-supporting growth structure. The flowers grow on short lateral shoots usually appearing before the leaves.

Its range extends from tropical west Africa to the horn of Africa, including: Senegal, Gambia, Mauritania, Mali, Cote D'Ivoire, Burkina Faso, Ghana, Togo, Benin, Nigeria, Niger, Cameroon, Chad, Central African Republic, Uganda, Ethiopia, Eritrea, Somalia, Tanzania and Kenya.
