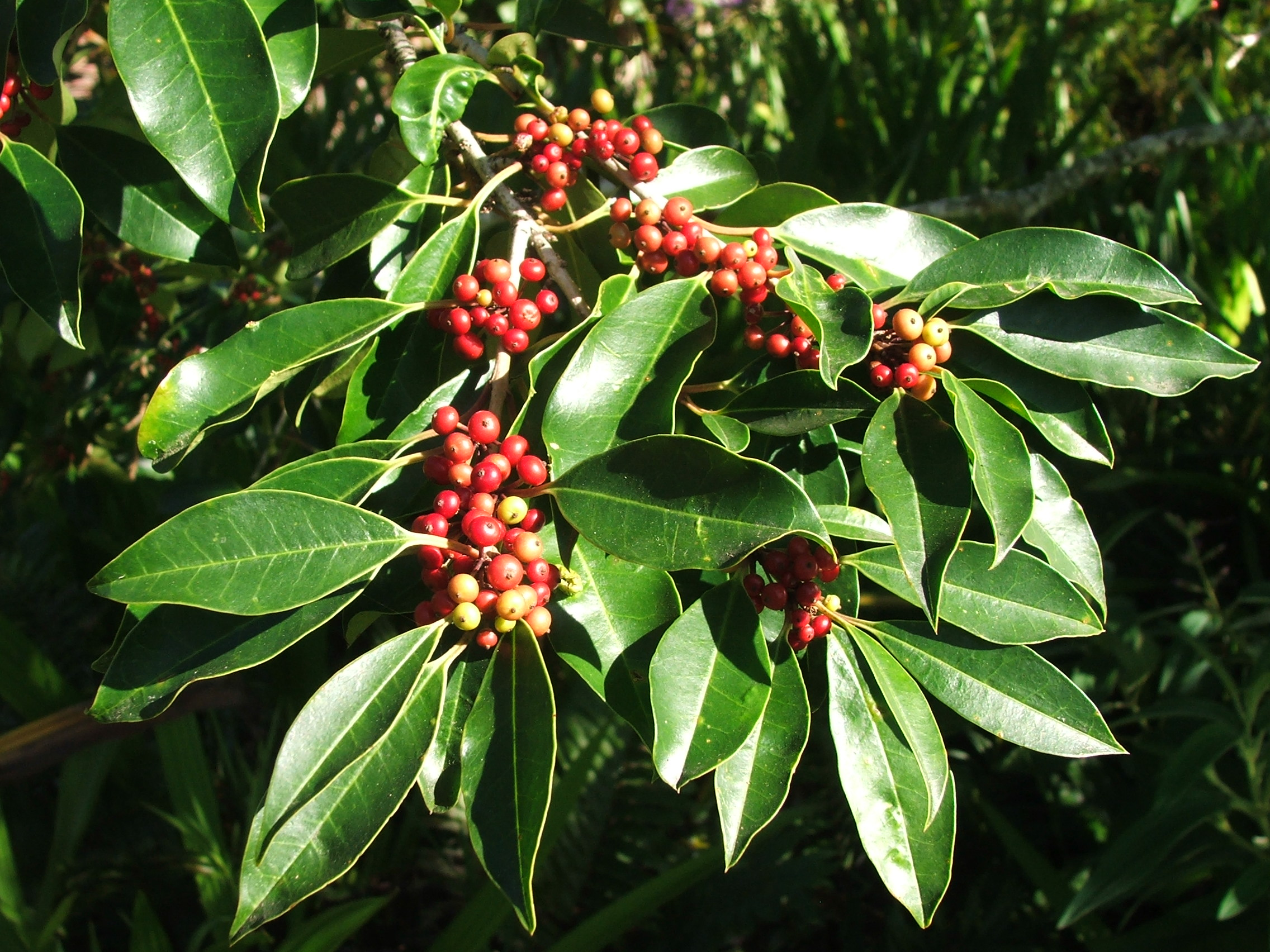

Conservation status
- Least Concern (IUCN 3.1)

Scientific classification
- Kingdom: Plantae
- Clade: Tracheophytes
- Clade: Angiosperms
- Clade: Eudicots
- Clade: Asterids
- Order: Aquifoliales
- Family: Aquifoliaceae
- Genus: Ilex
- Species: I. mitis

Binomial name
- Ilex mitis (L.) Radlk.

= Ilex mitis =

Species of holly

Ilex mitis (commonly called Cape holly, African holly, waterboom or umDuma) is a tall, dense, evergreen tree that is indigenous to Sub-Saharan Africa and Madagascar. It makes an excellent fast-growing hedge for gardens - growing tall, straight and dense.

== Appearance ==
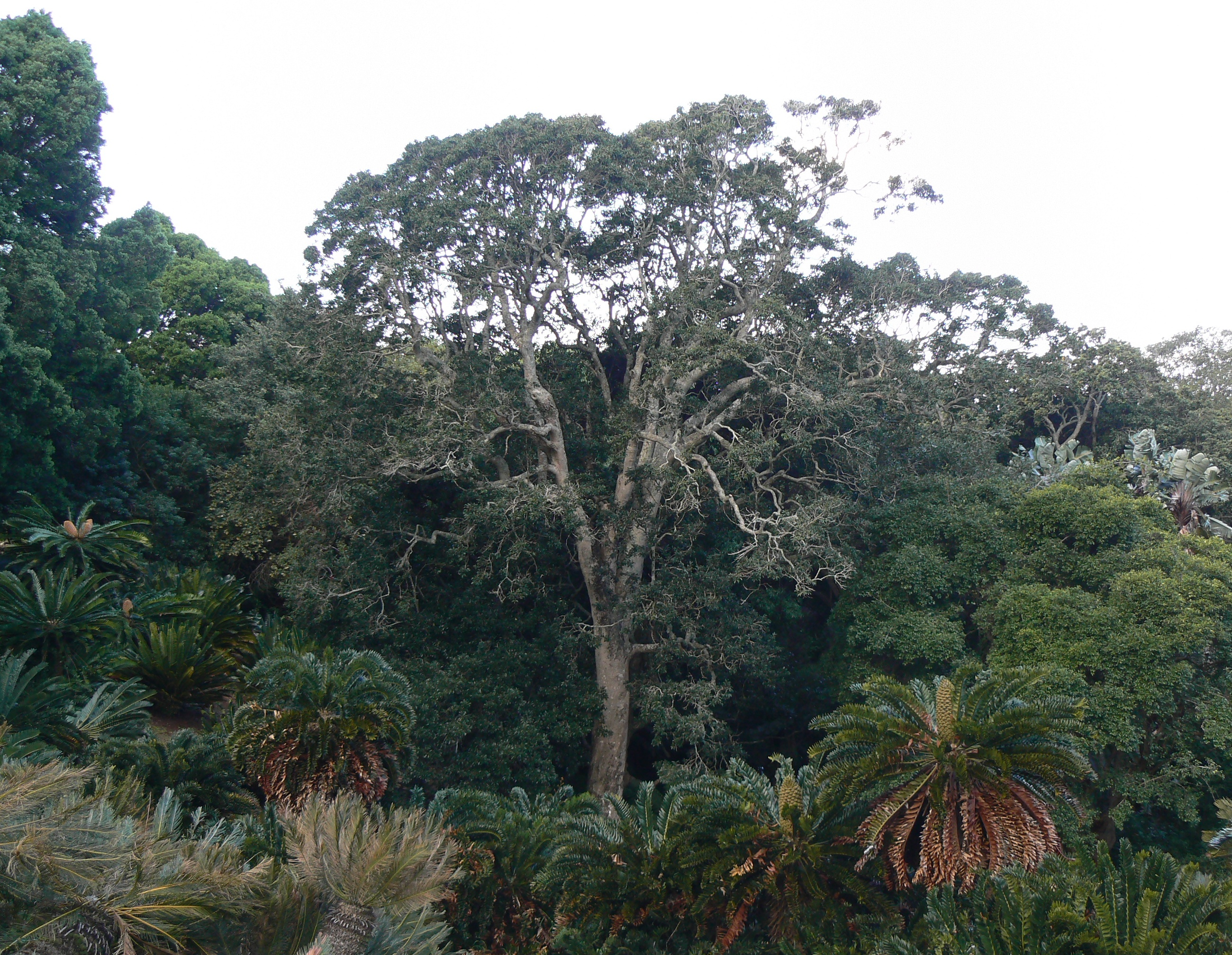
If it is not occasionally pruned back, Ilex mitis can eventually grow enormous.

If not pruned, Ilex mitis can grow to a height of 20 meters or more. Its trunk is straight, grey or brown and usually spotted while it produces a dense, even canopy. Young growth and leaf-stalks tend to be purple or red. The simply shaped, pointed, shiny-green leaves have wavy margins that are sometimes slightly serrated. The tree can be identified by its purple or maroon leaf stalks and the leaves’ strongly impressed midribs.
The small, white, scented flowers appear in spring. Ilex mitis is dioecious, with separate male and female trees.
The bright red fruits ripen in autumn, creating a colourful display and attracting a variety of birds.

== Range and habitat ==
This is the only holly (Ilex) species native to sub-Saharan Africa. It has a wide but discontinuous distribution in west, central, east, and southern Africa.

It has an Afromontane distribution. In tropical Africa it is mostly found at higher elevations, growing as high as 3,150 meters.

In West Africa it is found in high-elevation forests in the Guinea Highlands of Guinea, Liberia, Sierra Leone, and in the Cameroon Highlands of Nigeria and Cameroon. It inhabits the islands of Bioko, Sao Tomé, and Príncipe in the Gulf of Guinea. It is found throughout the highlands of eastern Africa, including the Ethiopian Highlands and the highlands bordering the Great Rift Valley. It is also native to the central highlands of Angola and the highlands of Madagascar.

In southern Africa it inhabits the Eastern Highlands of Zimbabwe and Mozambique. In South Africa it grows naturally in all provinces, from Cape Town in the south to the border with Zimbabwe. It is usually found growing on the banks of rivers and in moist spots in Afro-montane forest, as low as sea level along the southern coast.

It is most often found in moist montane forests and in riparian forests. It is also found in high-elevation thickets, and in open-canopied forests in association with Podocarpus latifolius and Syzygium guineense. In Ethiopia it grows in association with Galiniera saxifraga between 1,950 and 2,340 meters elevation. Young trees grow best in sun or light shade, and mature trees tolerate drought and frost.

== Ecology ==
In southern Africa trees are pollinated by wasps and bees. Seeds are likely dispersed by birds.

== Varieties ==
There are two accepted varieties. Ilex mitis var. mitis covers most of the species' range. Ilex mitis var. schliebenii is limited to the Uluguru Mountains and Lukwangule Plateau of Tanzania. Var. schleibenii is threatened with habitat loss from forest clearance for timber harvesting and agriculture, and its conservation status is assessed as vulnerable.

== Growing Ilex mitis ==
This is a fast-growing tree, growing nearly a meter a year in ideal conditions. It grows especially well in wet areas like beside lakes or rivers and it tolerates frost, making it suitable for colder climates. Fresh seed will usually germinate, but should first be dried out a bit. If kept moist after planting, the young plants usually sprout several weeks later. It transplants well, but needs to be protected from drying out and direct sun whilst young.

It has no known diseases or pests, though in the wild it is one of the favourite foods of elephants.

== Pictures ==
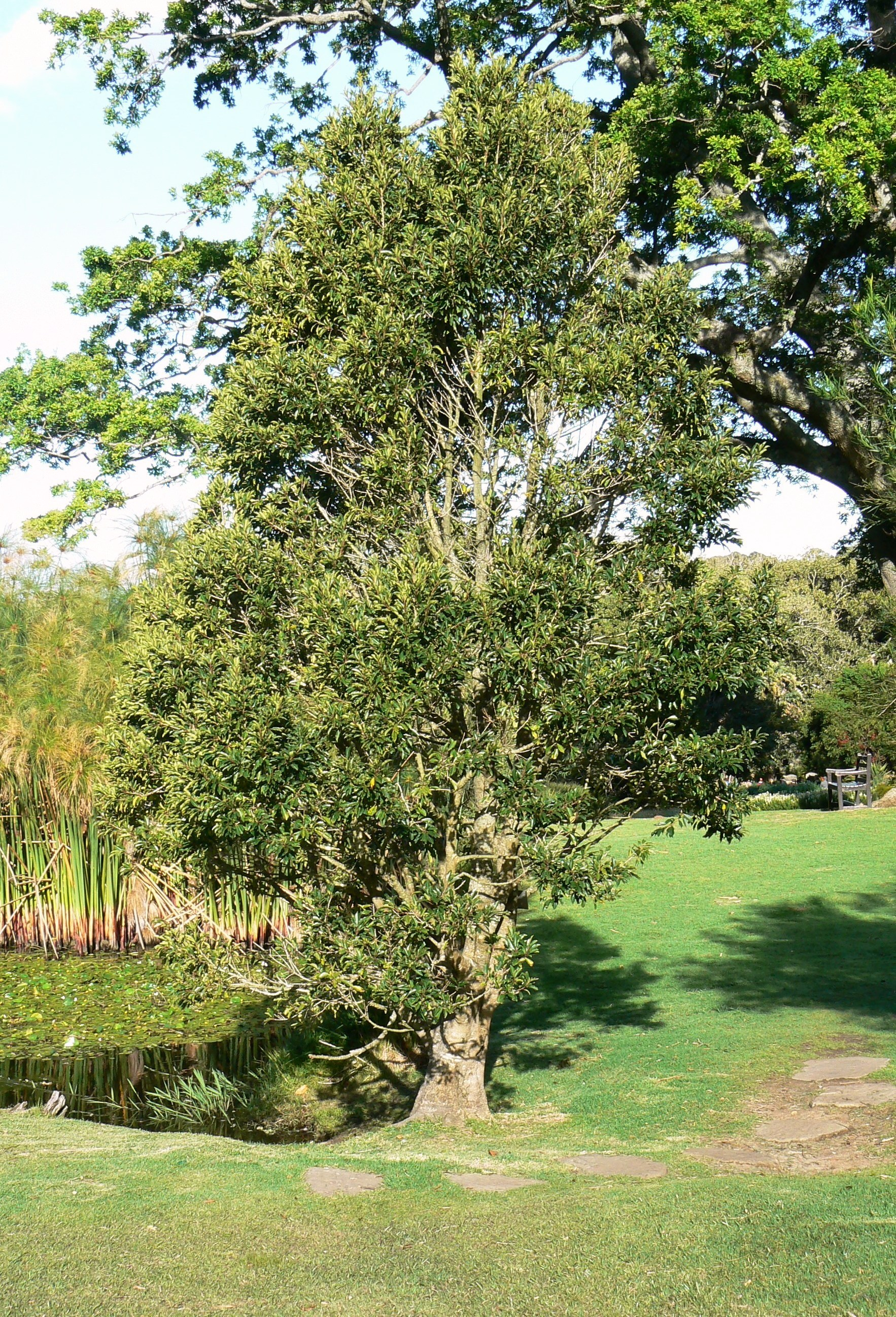
A small Ilex mitis, growing un-pruned as a feature tree.

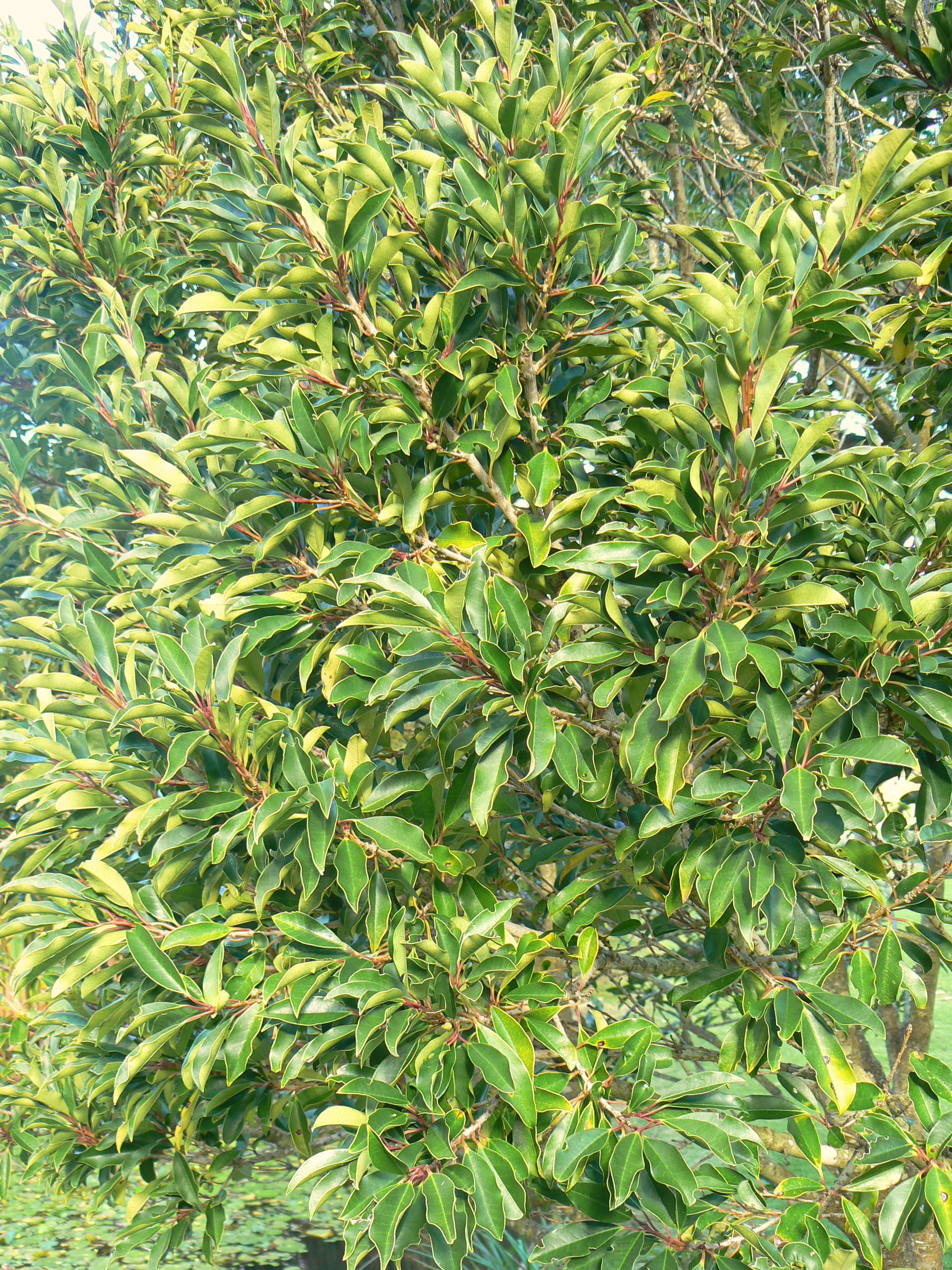
Foliage detail

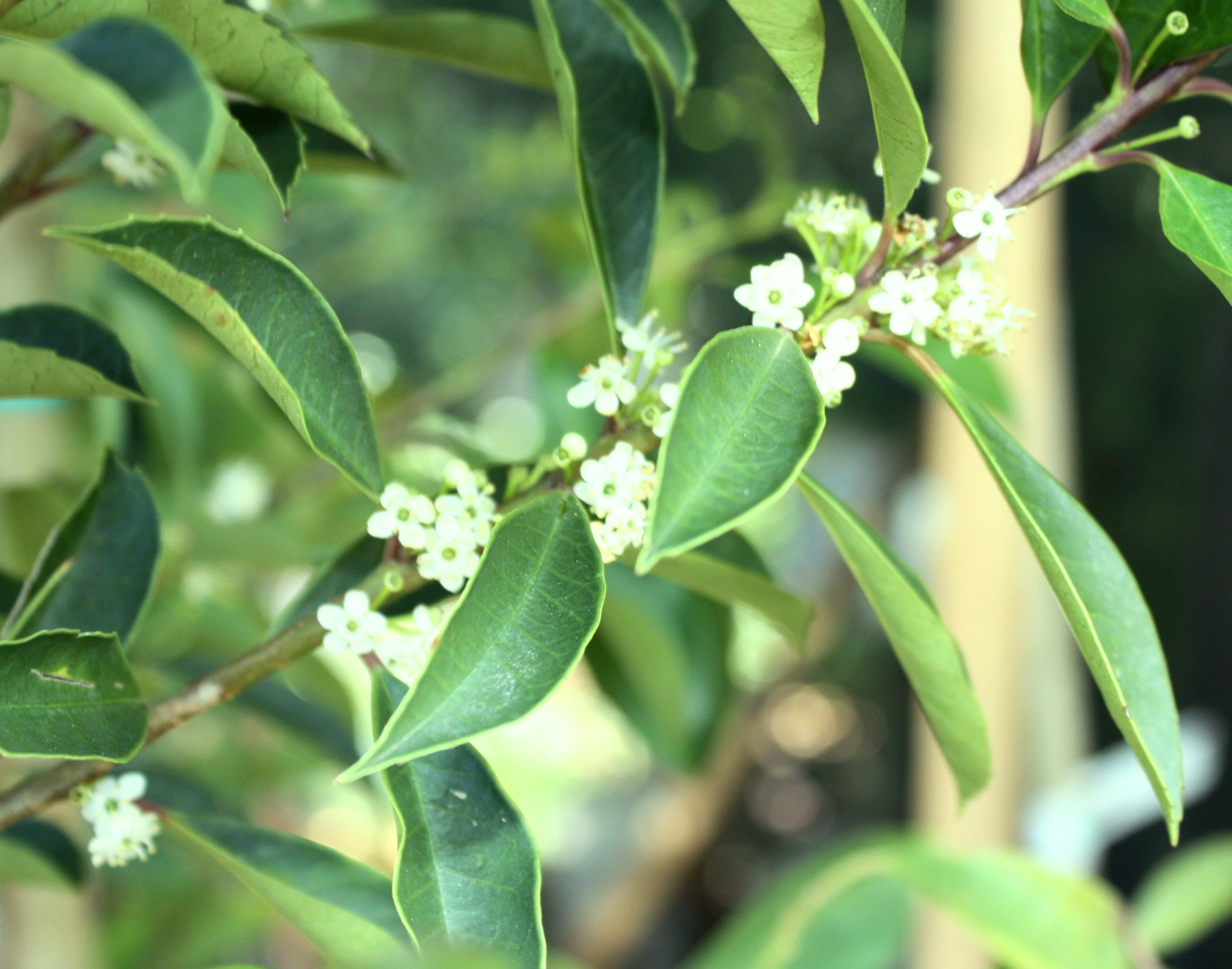
Ilex mitis blossoms.
