= Discospermum philippinensis =

Scientific classification
- Kingdom: Plantae
- Clade: Tracheophytes
- Clade: Angiosperms
- Clade: Eudicots
- Clade: Asterids
- Order: Gentianales
- Family: Rubiaceae
- Subfamily: Ixoroideae
- Tribe: Coffeeae
- Genus: Discospermum
- Species: D. philippinensis

Binomial name
- Discospermum philippinensis Arriola & Alejandro (2015)

Species of plant

Discospermum philippinensis is a species of flowering plant in the family Rubiaceae. The species was described in 2015, and was found on Mt. Banahaw, Tayabas, Quezon Province, Philippines at an elevation of 623 m. This species closely resemble that of D. whitfordii because of its persistent calyx, and prominent disk below the fruit apex. However, the species differs from D. whitfordii due to leaf blades with a much larger dimensions, the leaf apex of which are acute to attenuate, the fruits of which are faintly ribbed, with the thin mesocarp that are smaller, and fewer seeds per locule.

== Etymology ==
The scientific nomenclature where the specific epithet philippinensis pertains to the species being endemic in the Philippines.
