= Nargedia =

Conservation status
- Vulnerable (IUCN 2.3)

Scientific classification
- Kingdom: Plantae
- Clade: Tracheophytes
- Clade: Angiosperms
- Clade: Eudicots
- Clade: Asterids
- Order: Gentianales
- Family: Rubiaceae
- Subfamily: Ixoroideae
- Tribe: Octotropideae
- Genus: Nargedia; Bedd.
- Species: N. macrocarpa

Binomial name
- Nargedia macrocarpa Bedd.

Genus of plants

Nargedia is a monotypic genus of plant in the family Rubiaceae. It has only one species, Nargedia macrocarpa, endemic to Sri Lanka.
