= Belonophora ongensis =

Conservation status
- Critically Endangered (IUCN 2.3)

Scientific classification
- Kingdom: Plantae
- Clade: Tracheophytes
- Clade: Angiosperms
- Clade: Eudicots
- Clade: Asterids
- Order: Gentianales
- Family: Rubiaceae
- Genus: Belonophora
- Species: B. ongensis

Binomial name
- Belonophora ongensis S.E.Dawson & Cheek

Species of plant

Belonophora ongensis is a species of flowering plant in the family Rubiaceae. It is native to Gabon and Cameroon. Its natural habitat is subtropical or tropical moist lowland forests. It is threatened by habitat loss.
