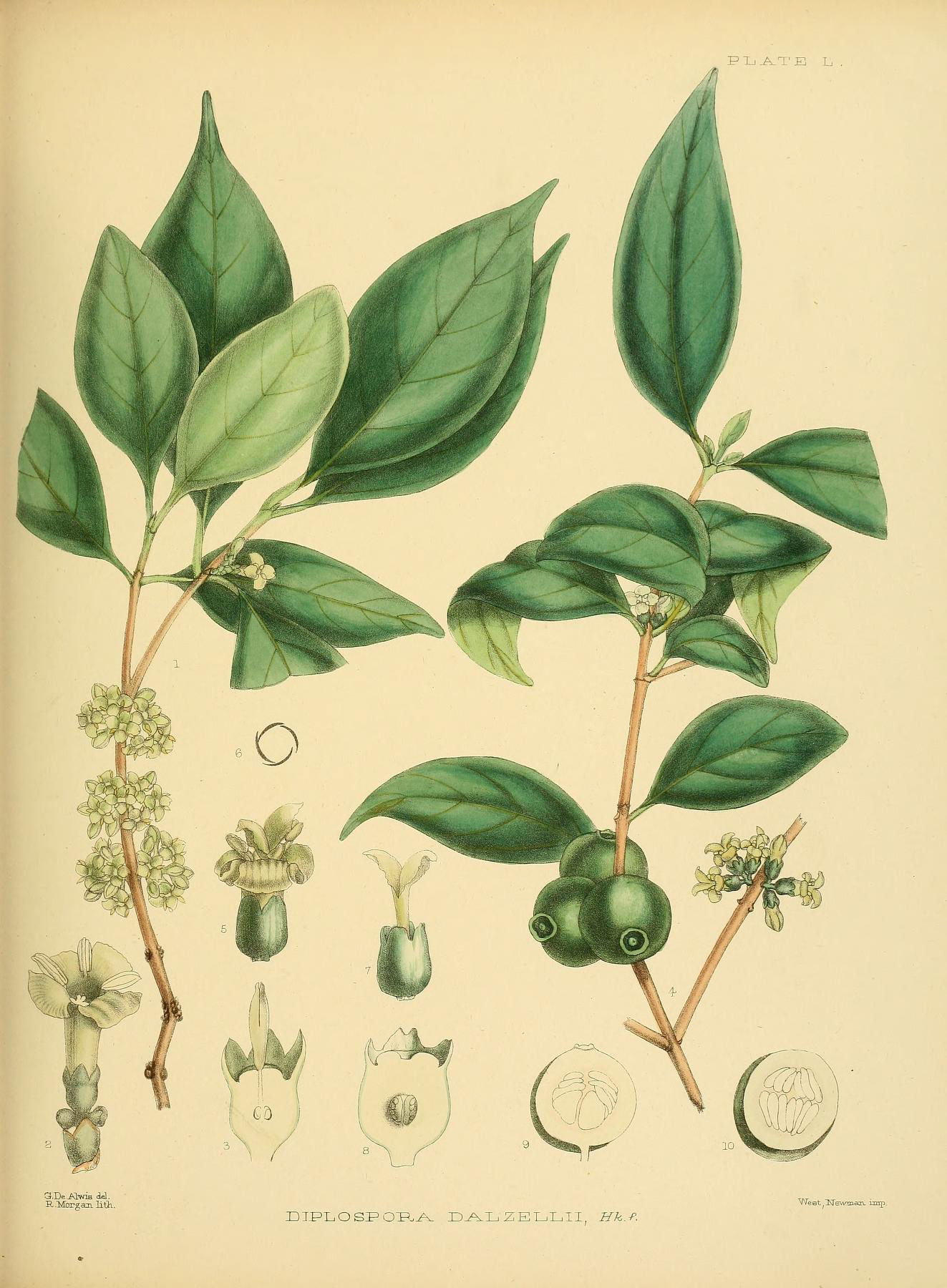
- Discospermum sphaerocarpum

Scientific classification
- Kingdom: Plantae
- Clade: Tracheophytes
- Clade: Angiosperms
- Clade: Eudicots
- Clade: Asterids
- Order: Gentianales
- Family: Rubiaceae
- Subfamily: Ixoroideae
- Tribe: Coffeeae
- Genus: Discospermum; Dalzell

Type species
- Discospermum apiocarpum Dalzell ex Hook.f.

Synonyms
- Xantonnea Pierre ex Pit.

= Discospermum =

Genus of plants

Discospermum is a genus of flowering plants in the family Rubiaceae. The genus is found from India to the Philippines.

== Species ==
- Discospermum abnorme (Korth.) S.J.Ali & Robbr.
- Discospermum apiocarpum Dalzell ex Hook.f.
- Discospermum beccarianum (King & Gamble) S.J.Ali & Robbr.
- Discospermum coffeoides (Pierre ex Pit.) Arriola & A.P.Davis
- Discospermum javanicum (Miq.) Kuntze
- Discospermum malaccense (Hook.f.) Kuntze
- Discospermum parvifolium Kuntze
- Discospermum philippinensis Arriola & Alejandro
- Discospermum polyspermum (Valeton) Ruhsam
- Discospermum quocensis (Pierre ex Pit.) Arriola & A.P.Davis
- Discospermum reyesii Arriola, Valdez & Alejandro
- Discospermum sphaerocarpum Dalzell ex Hook.f.
- Discospermum whitfordii (Elmer) S.J.Ali & Robbr.
