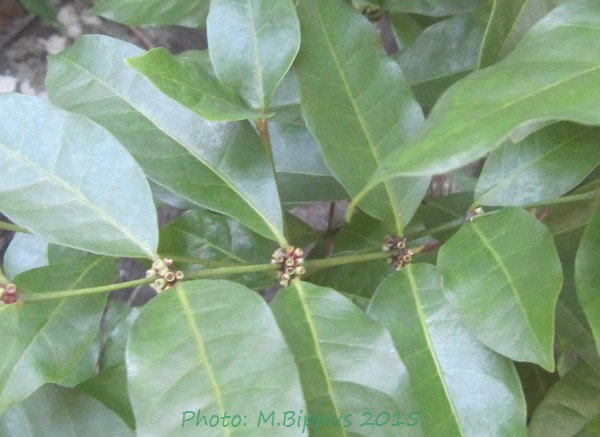
- Polysphaeria multiflora

Scientific classification
- Kingdom: Plantae
- Clade: Tracheophytes
- Clade: Angiosperms
- Clade: Eudicots
- Clade: Asterids
- Order: Gentianales
- Family: Rubiaceae
- Subfamily: Ixoroideae
- Tribe: Octotropideae
- Genus: Polysphaeria; Hook.f.

= Polysphaeria =

Genus of plants

Polysphaeria is a genus of plants in the family Rubiaceae, and its native range is Madagascar and Tropical Africa. It contains the following 22 species according to Plants of the World Online:

- Polysphaeria acuminata Verdc.
- Polysphaeria aethiopica Verdc.
- Polysphaeria arbuscula K.Schum.
- Polysphaeria braunii K.Krause
- Polysphaeria capuronii Verdc.
- Polysphaeria cleistocalyx Verdc.
- Polysphaeria dischistocalyx Brenan
- Polysphaeria grandiflora Cavaco
- Polysphaeria grandis (Baill.) Cavaco
- Polysphaeria hirta Verdc.
- Polysphaeria lanceolata Hiern
- Polysphaeria lepidocarpa Verdc.
- Polysphaeria macrantha Brenan
- Polysphaeria macrophylla K.Schum.
- Polysphaeria maxima (Baill.) Cavaco
- Polysphaeria multiflora Hiern
- Polysphaeria ntemii S.E.Dawson & Gereau
- Polysphaeria ovata Cavaco
- Polysphaeria parvifolia Hiern
- Polysphaeria pedunculata K.Schum. ex De Wild.
- Polysphaeria subnudifaux Verdc.
- Polysphaeria tubulosa (Baill.) Cavaco
