= Canephora =

- Canephora hirsuta

Scientific classification
- Kingdom: Plantae
- Clade: Tracheophytes
- Clade: Angiosperms
- Clade: Eudicots
- Clade: Asterids
- Order: Gentianales
- Family: Rubiaceae
- Subfamily: Ixoroideae
- Tribe: Octotropideae
- Genus: Canephora; Juss.

Type species
- Canephora madagascariensis J.F.Gmel.

Genus of plants

Canephora is a genus of flowering plants in the family Rubiaceae, indigenous to Madagascar.

== Description ==
The name Canephora, "basket bearer", refers to both the flattened peduncle topped by a "hollowed apex bearing flowers" and to the ritual office for unmarried young women in ancient Greece, as bearer of a sacred basket full of offerings during processions at festivals.

Canephora is unique in Rubiaceae in having peduncles transformed into flattened, green axes called phylloclades.

Canephora madagascariensis has bright white, campanulate flowers and apparently edible, red fruits, locally known as "hazongalala".

== Species ==
Currently, five species are recognized, but several new species await description.

- Canephora angustifolia Wernham
- Canephora goudotii Wernham
- Canephora humblotii Drake
- Canephora madagascariensis J.F.Gmel.
- Canephora maroana A.DC.
