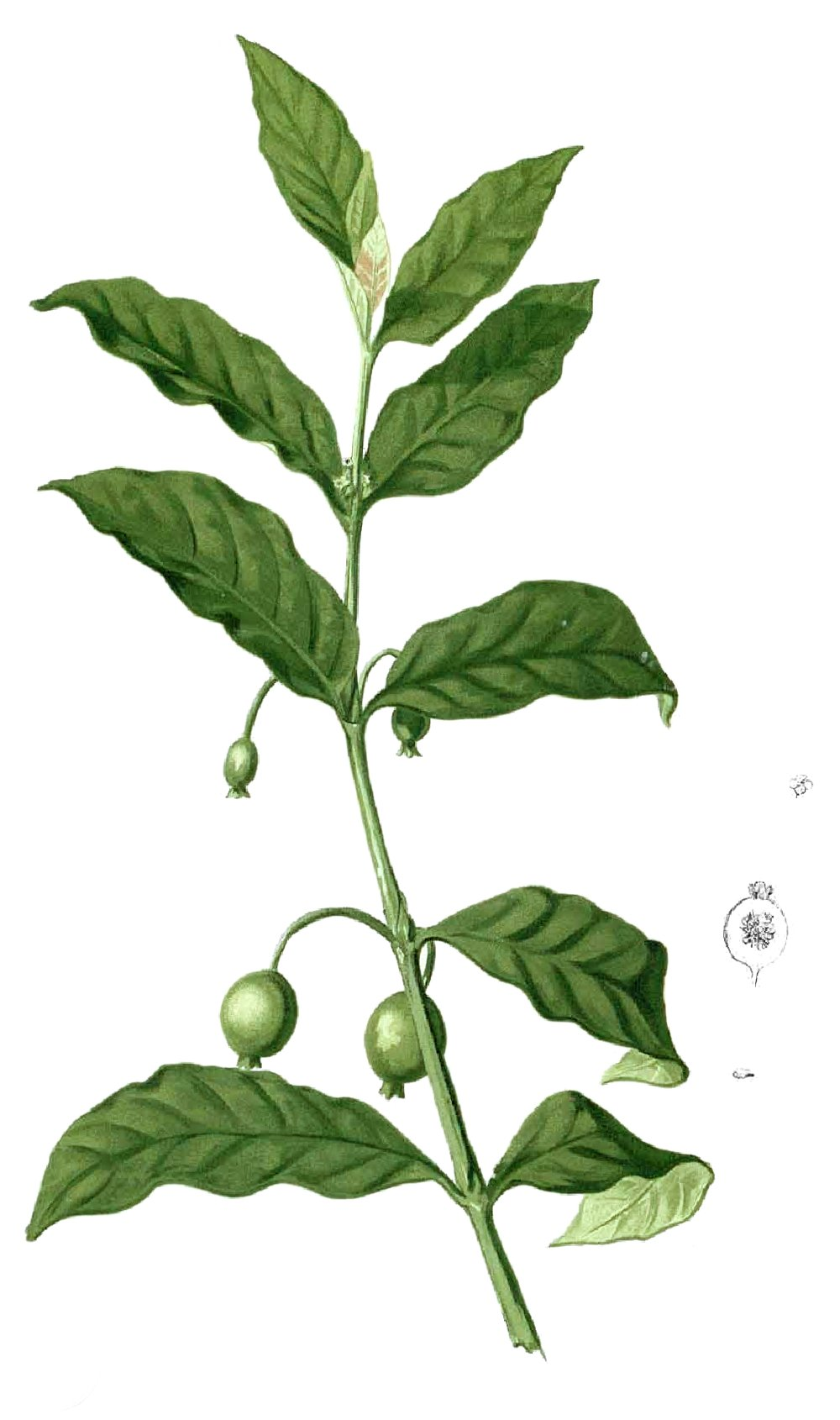
- Villaria odorata

Scientific classification
- Kingdom: Plantae
- Clade: Tracheophytes
- Clade: Angiosperms
- Clade: Eudicots
- Clade: Asterids
- Order: Gentianales
- Family: Rubiaceae
- Subfamily: Ixoroideae
- Tribe: Octotropideae
- Genus: Villaria; Rolfe

Type species
- Villaria philippinensis (syn of V. odorata) Rolfe

= Villaria =

Genus of plants

Villaria is a genus of plants in the family Rubiaceae. It contains 5 accepted species, all endemic to the Philippines.

- Villaria acutifolia (Elmer) Merr. - Mindanao
- Villaria fasciculiflora Quisumb. & Merr. - Luzon
- Villaria glomerata (Bartl. ex DC.) Mulyan. & Ridsdale - Luzon
- Villaria leytensis Alejandro & Meve - Leyte
- Villaria odorata (Blanco) Merr. - Luzon
