= Argocoffeopsis lemblinii =

Conservation status
- Extinct (IUCN 2.3)

Scientific classification
- Kingdom: Plantae
- Clade: Tracheophytes
- Clade: Angiosperms
- Clade: Eudicots
- Clade: Asterids
- Order: Gentianales
- Family: Rubiaceae
- Genus: Argocoffeopsis
- Species: †A. lemblinii

Binomial name
- †Argocoffeopsis lemblinii (A.Chev.) Robbr.

Synonyms
- Argocoffea lemblinii (A.Chev.) J.-F.Leroy; Coffea lemblinii (A.Chev.) Keay; Randia lemblinii A.Chev.

Species of plant

Argocoffeopsis lemblinii is an extinct relative of the coffee plant, within the family Rubiaceae. It is only known from the holotype collected by French botanist Auguste Jean Baptiste Chevalier in January 1907 in the valley of the Agnéby river in Côte d'Ivoire, and was not found during subsequent surveys. Argocoffeopsis lemblinii was a much branched shrub which could reach a height of about 50 centimetres. The flowers were white, the small fruits spheroid. It grew in a forest habitat.
