= Calycosiphonia macrochlamys =

Conservation status
- Vulnerable (IUCN 3.1)

Scientific classification
- Kingdom: Plantae
- Clade: Tracheophytes
- Clade: Angiosperms
- Clade: Eudicots
- Clade: Asterids
- Order: Gentianales
- Family: Rubiaceae
- Genus: Calycosiphonia
- Species: C. macrochlamys

Binomial name
- Calycosiphonia macrochlamys (K.Schum.) Robbrecht

Species of plant

Calycosiphonia macrochlamys is a species of plant in the family Rubiaceae. It is found in Cameroon, the Democratic Republic of the Congo, Equatorial Guinea, Gabon, and Ghana. Its natural habitat is subtropical or tropical moist lowland forests. It is threatened by habitat loss.
