= Nostolachma crassifolia =

Conservation status
- Endangered (IUCN 2.3)

Scientific classification
- Kingdom: Plantae
- Clade: Tracheophytes
- Clade: Angiosperms
- Clade: Eudicots
- Clade: Asterids
- Order: Gentianales
- Family: Rubiaceae
- Genus: Nostolachma
- Species: N. crassifolia

Binomial name
- Nostolachma crassifolia (Gamble) Deb. & Lahiri

Synonyms
- Coffea crassifolia Gamble; Lachnastoma crassifolium (Gamble) A.Chev.

Species of plant

Nostolachma crassifolia is a species of plant in the family Rubiaceae.

It is native to Kerala and Tamil Nadu in India.
