= Sericanthe toupetou =

Conservation status
- Endangered (IUCN 2.3)

Scientific classification
- Kingdom: Plantae
- Clade: Tracheophytes
- Clade: Angiosperms
- Clade: Eudicots
- Clade: Asterids
- Order: Gentianales
- Family: Rubiaceae
- Genus: Sericanthe
- Species: S. toupetou

Binomial name
- Sericanthe toupetou (Aubrev. & Pellegr.) Robbr.

Species of plant

Sericanthe toupetou is a species of plant in the family Rubiaceae. It is found in Ivory Coast and Ghana. It is threatened by habitat loss.
