= Belonophora coffeoides =

Conservation status
- Least Concern (IUCN 3.1)

Scientific classification
- Kingdom: Plantae
- Clade: Tracheophytes
- Clade: Angiosperms
- Clade: Eudicots
- Clade: Asterids
- Order: Gentianales
- Family: Rubiaceae
- Genus: Belonophora
- Species: B. coffeoides

Binomial name
- Belonophora coffeoides Hook.f.

Species of plant

Belonophora coffeoides is a species of flowering plant in the family Rubiaceae. It is found in tropical Africa. It is the type species of the genus Belonophora.

== Subspecies ==
Two subspecies are accepted as of April 2014:

- Belonophora coffeoides subsp. coffeoides - São Tomé (not seen since 1861, possibly extinct)
- Belonophora coffeoides subsp. hypoglauca (Welw. ex Hiern) S.E.Dawson & Cheek - Benin, Ghana, Guinée, Côte d'Ivoire, Liberia, Nigeria, Sierra Leone, Togo, Central African Republic, Cameroon, Gabon, Congo-Brazzaville, Congo-Kinshasa, Chad, Sudan, South Sudan, Uganda, Angola, Zambia
