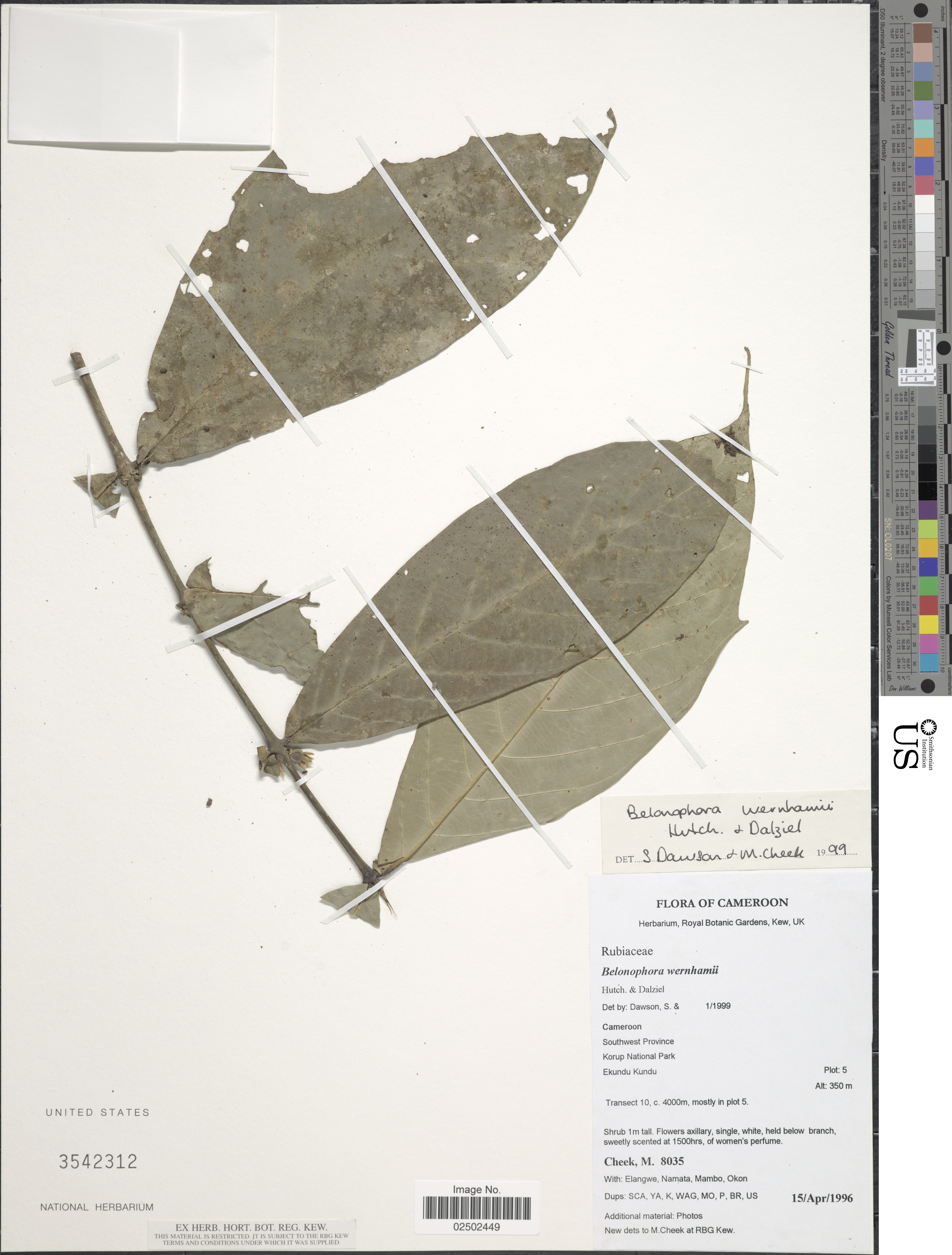
- Belonophora wernhamii Hutch.

Scientific classification
- Kingdom: Plantae
- Clade: Tracheophytes
- Clade: Angiosperms
- Clade: Eudicots
- Clade: Asterids
- Order: Gentianales
- Family: Rubiaceae
- Genus: Belonophora
- Species: B. wernhamii

Binomial name
- Belonophora wernhamii Hutch. & Dalziel

Synonyms
- Diplosporopsis coffeoides Wernham

= Belonophora wernhamii =

Species of plant

Belonophora wernhamii is a species of flowering plant in the family Rubiaceae. It is found in Nigeria and Cameroon.
