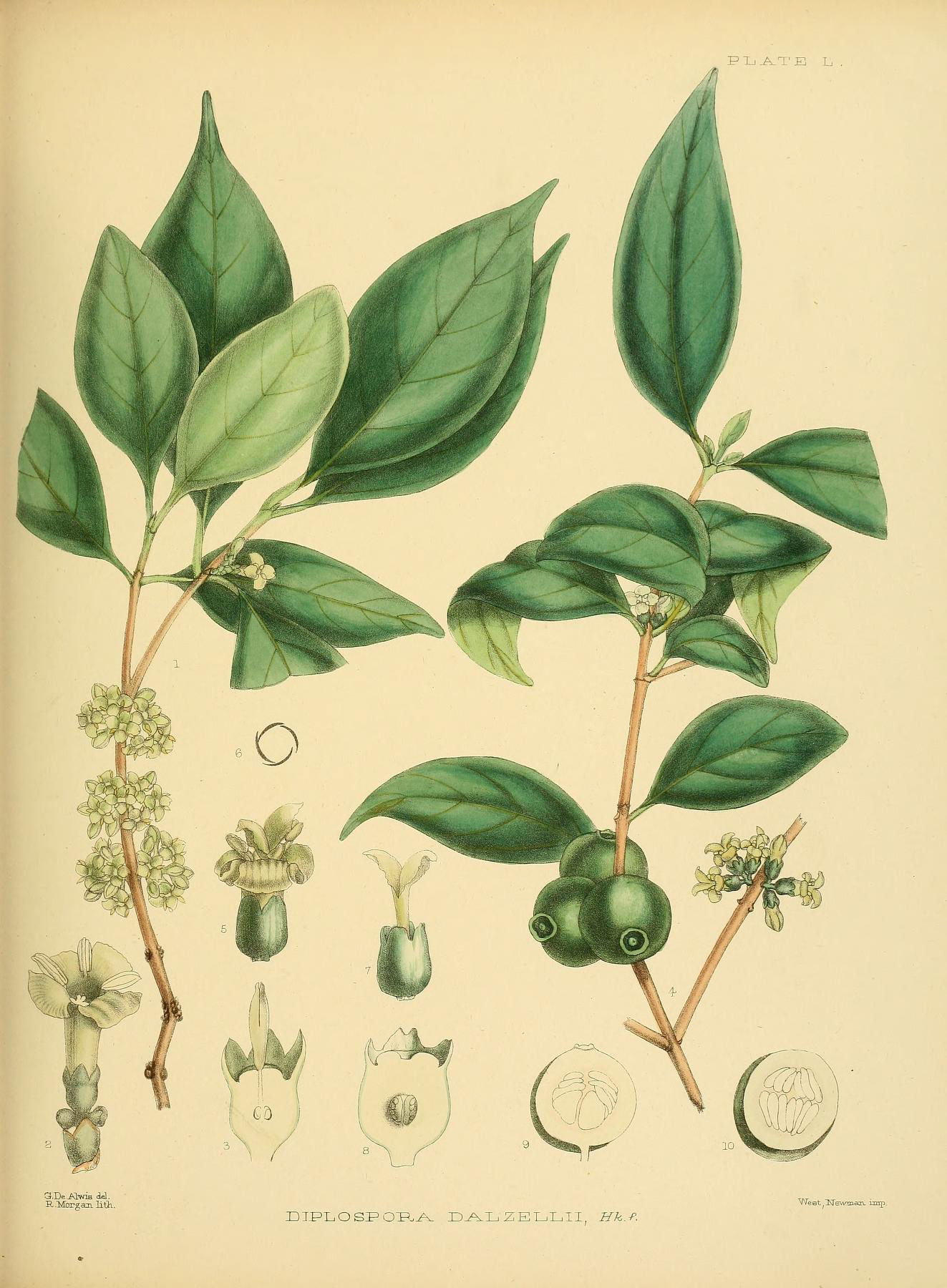

Scientific classification
- Kingdom: Plantae
- Clade: Embryophytes
- Clade: Tracheophytes
- Clade: Angiosperms
- Clade: Eudicots
- Clade: Asterids
- Order: Gentianales
- Family: Rubiaceae
- Genus: Discospermum
- Species: D. sphaerocarpum

Binomial name
- Discospermum sphaerocarpum Dalzell

Synonyms
- Diplospora dalzellii (Thwaites) Hook.f. Diplospora sphaerocarpa (Dalzell ex Hook.f.) Hook.f. Discospermum dalzellii Thwaites; Tricalysia dalzellii (Thwaites) Alston; Tricalysia sphaerocarpa (Dalzell ex Hook.f.) Gamble

= Discospermum sphaerocarpum =

Species of flowering plant

Discospermum sphaerocarpum is a small tree of family Rubiaceae that is native to India and Sri Lanka. Tricalysia dalzellii is considered a synonym, but in Sri Lanka, Tricalysia dalzellii is sometimes accepted in text books and field guides that regard it as an endemic species.

== In culture ==
The plant known as Tricalysia dalzellii is known as "vella" by Sri Lankans.
