= Motandra paniculata =

Scientific classification
- Kingdom: Plantae
- Clade: Embryophytes
- Clade: Tracheophytes
- Clade: Angiosperms
- Clade: Eudicots
- Clade: Asterids
- Order: Gentianales
- Family: Apocynaceae
- Genus: Motandra
- Species: M. paniculata

Binomial name
- Motandra paniculata (Poir.) I.M.Turner

Synonyms
- Echites paniculatus Poir.; Baissea guineensis (Thonn.) Roberty; Echites guineensis Thonn.; Echites paniculatus Thonn. ex A.DC.; Motandra altissima Stapf; Motandra guineensis (Thonn.) A.DC.; Motandra pyramidalis Stapf; Motandra rostrata K.Schum.

Species of plant

Motandra paniculata, synonym Motandra guineensis, is a plant in the family Apocynaceae. It grows as a climbing shrub or liana up to 40 m (130 ft) long, with a stem diameter of up to 10 cm (4 in). Its fragrant flowers feature a white to greenish white corolla. The fruit is dark green with paired follicles, each up to 18 cm (7 in) long. Motandra paniculata is found in a variety of habitats from sea level to 1,200 m (4,000 ft) altitude. In local traditional medicine, it is used for eye infections, toothache, headache and postpartum stomach pain. The species is native to Guinea, Mali, Sierra Leone, Liberia, Ivory Coast, Ghana, Togo, Benin, Nigeria, Sudan, Cameroon, the Central African Republic, Gabon, the Republic of the Congo, the Democratic Republic of the Congo, Burundi, Uganda and Angola.
