= Belonophora talbotii =

Conservation status
- Vulnerable (IUCN 2.3)

Scientific classification
- Kingdom: Plantae
- Clade: Tracheophytes
- Clade: Angiosperms
- Clade: Eudicots
- Clade: Asterids
- Order: Gentianales
- Family: Rubiaceae
- Genus: Belonophora
- Species: B. talbotii

Binomial name
- Belonophora talbotii (Wernham) Keay

Species of plant

Belonophora talbotii is a species of flowering plant in the family Rubiaceae. It is found in Nigeria, Cameroon and Gabon. It is threatened by habitat loss.
