= Jovetia =

Scientific classification
- Kingdom: Plantae
- Clade: Tracheophytes
- Clade: Angiosperms
- Clade: Eudicots
- Clade: Asterids
- Order: Gentianales
- Family: Rubiaceae
- Subfamily: Ixoroideae
- Tribe: Octotropideae
- Genus: Jovetia; Guédès
- Species: J. humilis

Binomial name
- Jovetia humilis Guédès

Synonyms
- Jovetia erecta Guédès

Genus of plants

Jovetia is a monotypic genus of plants in the family Rubiaceae. It contains only one currently accepted species, Jovetia humilis, endemic to Madagascar.
