= Belonophora =

Scientific classification
- Kingdom: Plantae
- Clade: Tracheophytes
- Clade: Angiosperms
- Clade: Eudicots
- Clade: Asterids
- Order: Gentianales
- Family: Rubiaceae
- Subfamily: Ixoroideae
- Tribe: Coffeeae
- Genus: Belonophora; Hook.f.

Type species
- Belonophora coffeoides Hook.f.

Synonyms
- Diplosporopsis Wernham; Kerstingia K.Schum.

Genus of plants

Belonophora is a genus of flowering plants in the family Rubiaceae. It is found in Tropical Africa from Senegal east to Sudan and south to Angola. It was described by Joseph Dalton Hooker in 1873.

== Species ==
- Belonophora coffeoides Hook.f.
  - Belonophora coffeoides subsp. coffeoides - São Tomé (not seen since 1861, possibly extinct)
  - Belonophora coffeoides subsp. hypoglauca (Welw. ex Hiern) S.E.Dawson & Cheek - Benin, Ghana, Guinée, Côte d'Ivoire, Liberia, Nigeria, Sierra Leone, Togo, Central African Republic, Cameroon, Gabon, Congo-Brazzaville, D.R.Congo, Chad, Sudan, Uganda, Angola, Zambia
- Belonophora coriacea Hoyle - Nigeria, Central African Republic, Cameroon, Equatorial Guinea, Congo-Brazzaville, D.R.Congo
- Belonophora ongensis S.E.Dawson & Cheek - Cameroon, Gabon
- Belonophora talbotii (Wernham) Keay - Nigeria, Cameroon, Gabon
- Belonophora wernhamii Hutch. & Dalziel - Nigeria, Cameroon
