= Belonophora coriacea =

Scientific classification
- Kingdom: Plantae
- Clade: Tracheophytes
- Clade: Angiosperms
- Clade: Eudicots
- Clade: Asterids
- Order: Gentianales
- Family: Rubiaceae
- Genus: Belonophora
- Species: B. coriacea

Binomial name
- Belonophora coriacea Hoyle

Species of plant

Belonophora coriacea is a species of flowering plant in the family Rubiaceae. It is found in Nigeria, Central African Republic, Cameroon, Equatorial Guinea, Congo-Brazzaville, and Congo-Kinshasa (Zaire or Democratic Republic of the Congo).
