= Raffenaldia =

Scientific classification
- Kingdom: Plantae
- Clade: Tracheophytes
- Clade: Angiosperms
- Clade: Eudicots
- Clade: Rosids
- Order: Brassicales
- Family: Brassicaceae
- Genus: Raffenaldia; Godr.

Synonyms
- Cossonia Durieu

Genus of flowering plant

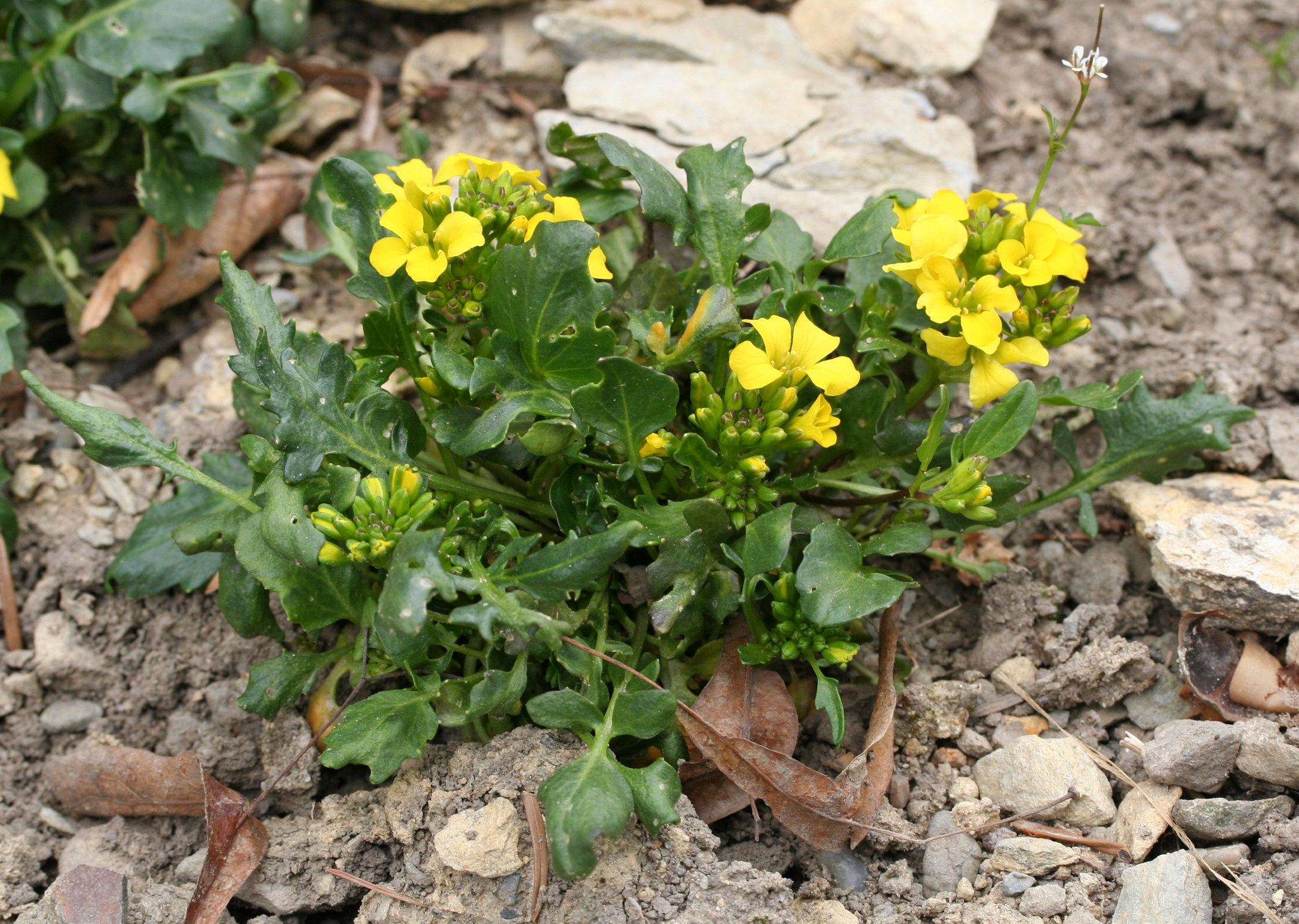
Raffenaldia primuloides in the Dresden Botanical Garden

Raffenaldia is a genus of flowering plants belonging to the family Brassicaceae.

It is native to Algeria and Morocco in northern Africa.

The genus name of Raffenaldia is in honour of Alire Raffeneau Delile (1778–1850), a French botanist. It was first described and published in Mém. Sect. Med. Acad. Sci. Montpellier Vol.1 on page 413 in 1853.

Known species, according to Kew:

- Raffenaldia platycarpa (Coss.) Stapf
- Raffenaldia primuloides Godr.
