= Flagenium =

Scientific classification
- Kingdom: Plantae
- Clade: Tracheophytes
- Clade: Angiosperms
- Clade: Eudicots
- Clade: Asterids
- Order: Gentianales
- Family: Rubiaceae
- Subfamily: Ixoroideae
- Tribe: Octotropideae
- Genus: Flagenium; Baill.

Type species
- Flagenium triflorum (Vahl) Baill.

Genus of plants

Flagenium is a genus of flowering plants in the family Rubiaceae. The genus is endemic to Madagascar.

== Species ==
- Flagenium farafanganense Ruhsam & A.P.Davis
- Flagenium latifolium Wernham
- Flagenium pedunculatum Ruhsam & A.P.Davis
- Flagenium petrikense Ruhsam & A.P.Davis
- Flagenium setosum (A.Rich.) Wernham
- Flagenium triflorum (Vahl) Baill.
