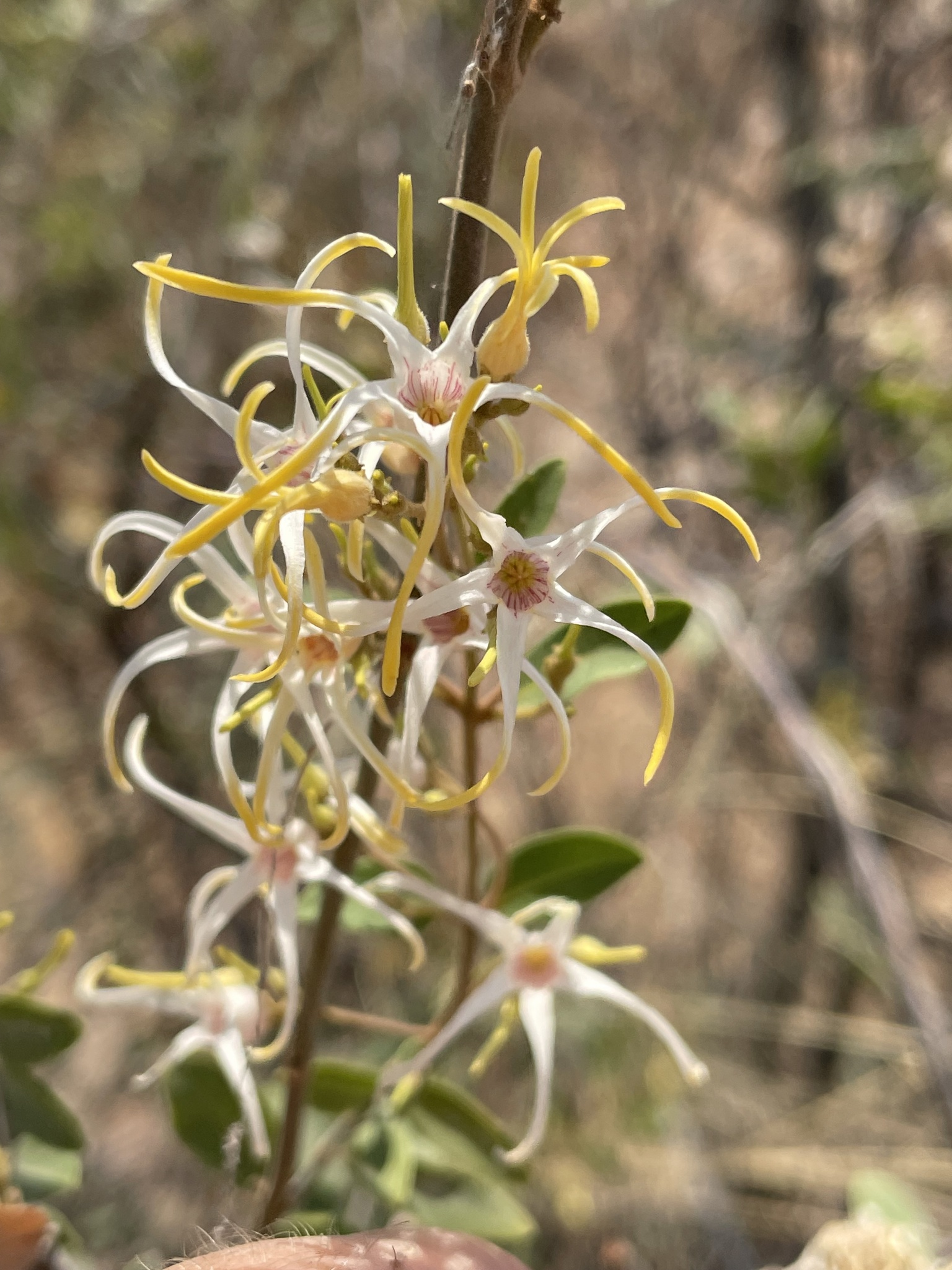
- Baissea wulfhorstii

Scientific classification
- Kingdom: Plantae
- Clade: Embryophytes
- Clade: Tracheophytes
- Clade: Spermatophytes
- Clade: Angiosperms
- Clade: Eudicots
- Clade: Asterids
- Order: Gentianales
- Family: Apocynaceae
- Subfamily: Apocynoideae
- Tribe: Baisseeae
- Genus: Baissea; A.DC.

Synonyms
- Codonura K.Schum.; Guerkea K.Schum.; Perinerion Baill.; Zygodia Benth.

= Baissea =

Genus of plants

Baissea is a genus of plant in the family Apocynaceae. It is native to tropical Africa.

As of July 2026 Plants of the World Online accepts these species:

- Baissea atrobrunnea O.Lachenaud – Gabon
- Baissea axillaris (Benth.) Hua – West and Central Africa
- Baissea baillonii Hua – West and Central Africa
- Baissea calophylla (K.Schum.) Stapf – West and Central Africa
- Baissea campanulata (K.Schum) de Kruif – West and Central Africa
- Baissea concinna Stapf ex Hutch. & Dalziel – Ivory Coast, Liberia
- Baissea congensis (R.D.Good) Jongkind – Cabinda, Gabon
- Baissea erythrosticta K.Schum. ex Stapf – Cameroon, Gabon
- Baissea floribunda (K.Schum.) Hua – Gabon
- Baissea gracillima (K.Schum.) Hua – Central Africa
- Baissea lane-poolei Stapf – West Africa
- Baissea laxiflora Stapf – West and Central Africa
- Baissea leonensis Benth. – West and Central Africa
- Baissea leontonori Dilst – Democratic Republic of the Congo, Burundi, Uganda
- Baissea major (Stapf) Hiern – Central Africa
- Baissea multiflora A.DC. – West and Central Africa
- Baissea myrtifolia (Benth.) Pichon – Central Africa
- Baissea ochrantha K.Schum. ex Stapf – Cameroon, Gabon
- Baissea odorata K.Schum. ex Stapf – West and Central Africa
- Baissea subrufa Stapf – Central Africa
- Baissea subsessilis (K.Schum.) Stapf – Cameroon, Nigeria
- Baissea viridiflora (K.Schum.) de Kruif – Southeast Africa
- Baissea welwitschii (Baill.) Stapf ex Hiern – West and Central Africa
- Baissea wulfhorstii Schinz – Namibia, Angola, Caprivi Strip, Botswana, Zambia
- Baissea zygodioides (K.Schum.) Stapf – West Africa
