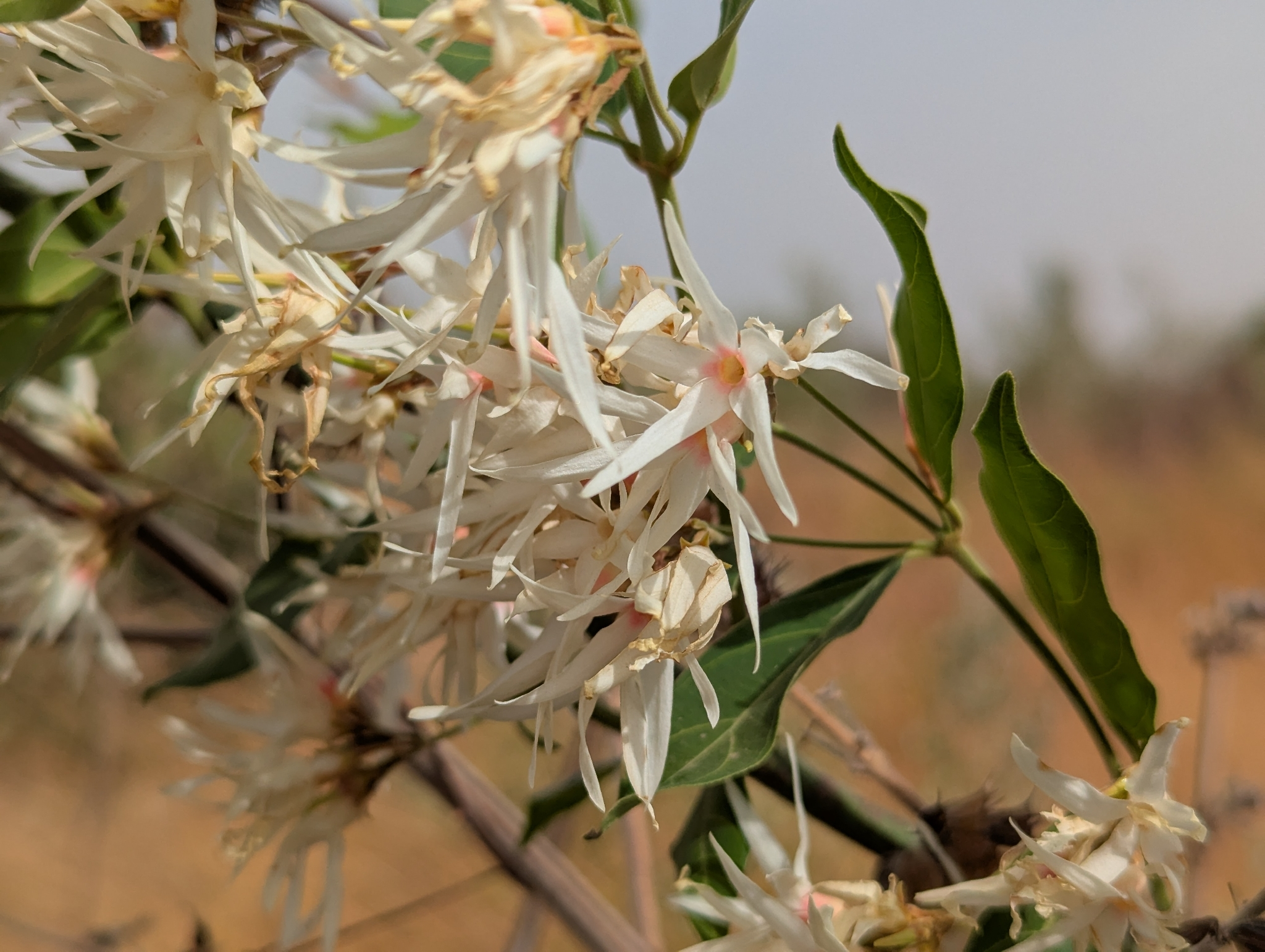
- in the Gambia

Scientific classification
- Kingdom: Plantae
- Clade: Embryophytes
- Clade: Tracheophytes
- Clade: Spermatophytes
- Clade: Angiosperms
- Clade: Eudicots
- Clade: Asterids
- Order: Gentianales
- Family: Apocynaceae
- Genus: Baissea
- Species: B. multiflora

Binomial name
- Baissea multiflora A.DC.

Synonyms
- Baissea angolensis Stapf; Baissea caudiloba Stapf; Baissea heudelotii Hua; Guerkea congolana De Wild. & T.Durand; Oncinotis axillaris K.Schum.

= Baissea multiflora =

Species of plant

Baissea multiflora is a plant in the family Apocynaceae.

== Description ==
Baissea multiflora grows as a shrub up to 6 metres (20 ft) tall or as a liana up to 30 m (100 ft) long, with a stem diameter of up to 12 cm (5 in). Its fragrant flowers feature a white, pink or orange corolla. The plant's local traditional medicinal uses include as a treatment for colic, rheumatism, arthritis, kidney problems, haemorrhoids, lumbago, conjunctivitis, appendicitis, diarrhoea and gonorrhoea.

== Distribution and habitat ==
Baissea multiflora is native to an area of tropical Africa from Senegal to Angola. Its habitat is in forests from 150 m (500 ft) to 1,400 m (5,000 ft) altitude.
