= Octotropis =

Scientific classification
- Kingdom: Plantae
- Clade: Tracheophytes
- Clade: Angiosperms
- Clade: Eudicots
- Clade: Asterids
- Order: Gentianales
- Family: Rubiaceae
- Genus: Octotropis; Bedd.

Genus of plants

Octotropis is a genus of flowering plants belonging to the family Rubiaceae.

Its native range is India.

== Species ==
Species:

- Octotropis travancorica Bedd.
