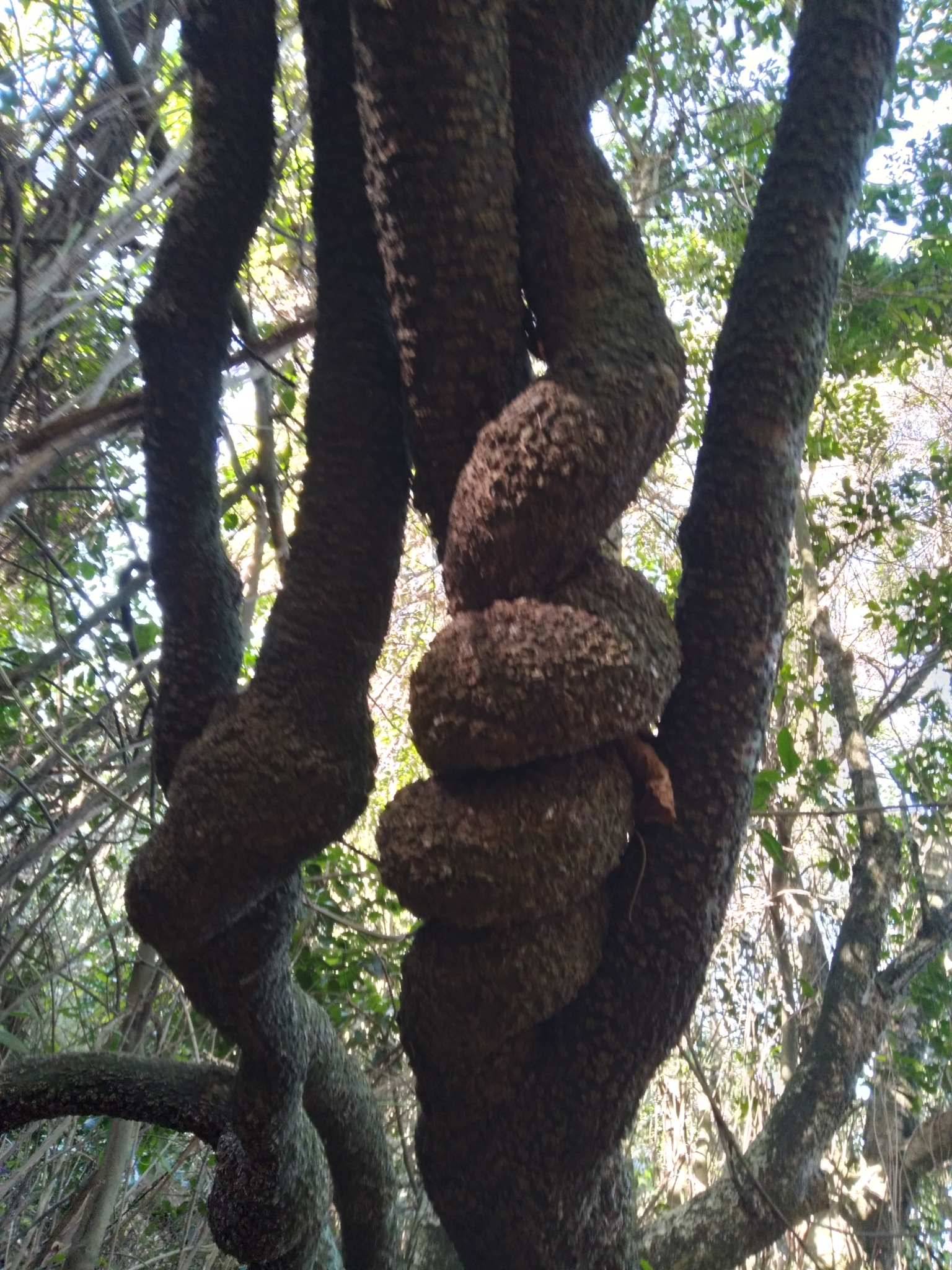
- In South Africa

Scientific classification
- Kingdom: Plantae
- Clade: Tracheophytes
- Clade: Angiosperms
- Clade: Eudicots
- Clade: Asterids
- Order: Gentianales
- Family: Apocynaceae
- Genus: Oncinotis
- Species: O. tenuiloba

Binomial name
- Oncinotis tenuiloba Stapf

Synonyms
- Motandra erlangeri K.Schum; Oncinotis chirindica S.Moore; Oncinotis inandensis J.M.Wood & Evans; Oncinotis natalensis Stapf

= Oncinotis tenuiloba =

Species of plant

Oncinotis tenuiloba, or magic rope, grows as a scrambling shrub or liana up to 30 metres (98 ft) long. Its flowers feature a yellow-green corolla. Fruit is pale brown with paired follicles, each up to 30 centimetres (12 in) long. Its habitat is evergreen forest from sea-level to 1,500 metres (4,900 ft) altitude. O. tenuiloba is found in Nigeria, Cameroon, the Central African Republic, the Republic of Congo, the Democratic Republic of Congo, Ethiopia, Sudan, Kenya, Uganda, Tanzania, Malawi, Mozambique, Zambia, Zimbabwe and South Africa.
