= Lemyrea =

Scientific classification
- Kingdom: Plantae
- Clade: Tracheophytes
- Clade: Angiosperms
- Clade: Eudicots
- Clade: Asterids
- Order: Gentianales
- Family: Rubiaceae
- Genus: Lemyrea (A.Chev.) A.Chev. & Beille

Genus of plants

Lemyrea is a genus of flowering plants belonging to the family Rubiaceae.

Its native range is Madagascar.

Species:

- Lemyrea ciliolata (A.Chev.) A.Chev. & Beille
- Lemyrea krugii (A.Chev.) A.Chev.
- Lemyrea marojejyensis J.R.Stone & A.P.Davis
- Lemyrea utilis (A.Chev.) A.Chev. & Beille
