= Calycosiphonia =

Scientific classification
- Kingdom: Plantae
- Clade: Tracheophytes
- Clade: Angiosperms
- Clade: Eudicots
- Clade: Asterids
- Order: Gentianales
- Family: Rubiaceae
- Subfamily: Ixoroideae
- Tribe: Coffeeae
- Genus: Calycosiphonia; Pierre ex Robbr.

Type species
- Calycosiphonia spathicalyx (K.Schum.) Robbr.

Genus of flowering plants

Calycosiphonia is a genus of flowering plants in the family Rubiaceae. It is native to tropical Africa from Ivory Coast to Sudan to Mozambique.

== Species ==
- Calycosiphonia macrochlamys (K.Schum.) Robbr. - Ghana, Cameroon, Equatorial Guinea, São Tomé and Príncipe, Democratic Republic of the Congo
- Calycosiphonia spathicalyx (K.Schum.) Robbr. - Ghana, Côte d'Ivoire, Nigeria, Central African Republic, Cameroon, Congo-Brazzaville, Democratic Republic of the Congo, Sudan, Kenya, Tanzania, Uganda, Angola, Malawi, Mozambique
