= Hypobathrum =

Scientific classification
- Kingdom: Plantae
- Clade: Tracheophytes
- Clade: Angiosperms
- Clade: Eudicots
- Clade: Asterids
- Order: Gentianales
- Family: Rubiaceae
- Genus: Hypobathrum; Blume

Genus of plants

Hypobathrum is a genus of flowering plants belonging to the family Rubiaceae.

Its native range is Tropical Asia.

Species:

- Hypobathrum bangueyense Mulyan. & Ridsdale
- Hypobathrum brevipes Koord. & Valeton
- Hypobathrum caudifolium Mulyan. & Ridsdale
- Hypobathrum collinum Mulyan. & Ridsdale
- Hypobathrum coniferum (Ridl.) Kiew
- Hypobathrum coniocarpum (Korth.) Mulyan. & Ridsdale
- Hypobathrum coriaceum Merr.
- Hypobathrum ellipticifolium Mulyan. & Ridsdale
- Hypobathrum frutescens Blume
- Hypobathrum glaberrimum Mulyan. & Ridsdale
- Hypobathrum glabrum Mulyan. & Ridsdale
- Hypobathrum gracile (Korth.) Mulyan. & Ridsdale
- Hypobathrum hirtum (Ridl.) Mulyan. & Ridsdale
- Hypobathrum hoaense Pierre ex Pit.
- Hypobathrum lancifolium Mulyan. & Ridsdale
- Hypobathrum lithophilum Mulyan. & Ridsdale
- Hypobathrum longifolium (DC.) K.M.Wong
- Hypobathrum microcarpum (Blume) Bakh.f.
- Hypobathrum multibracteatum Elmer
- Hypobathrum palustre Mulyan. & Ridsdale
- Hypobathrum parviflorum Miq.
- Hypobathrum purpureum (Elmer) Merr.
- Hypobathrum purpuricarpum (Elmer) ined.
- Hypobathrum racemosum (Roxb.) Kurz
- Hypobathrum rheophyticum Mulyan. & Ridsdale
- Hypobathrum riparium Mulyan. & Ridsdale
- Hypobathrum rufidulum (Miq.) Mulyan. & Ridsdale
- Hypobathrum salicinum (Miq.) Bakh.f.
- Hypobathrum sampitense Mulyan. & Ridsdale
- Hypobathrum subulatum Mulyan. & Ridsdale
- Hypobathrum venulosum (Hook.f.) K.M.Wong
