= Argocoffeopsis =

Scientific classification
- Kingdom: Plantae
- Clade: Tracheophytes
- Clade: Angiosperms
- Clade: Eudicots
- Clade: Asterids
- Order: Gentianales
- Family: Rubiaceae
- Subfamily: Ixoroideae
- Tribe: Coffeeae
- Genus: Argocoffeopsis; Lebrun

Type species
- Argocoffeopsis subcordata Hiern) Lebrun

Synonyms
- Argocoffea (Pierre ex De Wild.) Lebrun

Genus of plants

Argocoffeopsis is a genus of flowering plants in the family Rubiaceae. It is found in tropical Africa. They are lianas, climbing by means of horizontal or recurved lateral branches, or sometimes shrubs. Their papery bark is grey or brown and peeling off.

== Species ==
- Argocoffeopsis afzelii (Hiern) Robbr.
- Argocoffeopsis eketensis (Wernham) Robbr.
- Argocoffeopsis kivuensis Robbr.
- Argocoffeopsis lemblinii (A.Chev.) Robbr.
- Argocoffeopsis pulchella (K.Schum.) Robbr.
- Argocoffeopsis rupestris (Hiern) Robbr.
- Argocoffeopsis scandens (K.Schum.) Robbr.
- Argocoffeopsis subcordata (Hiern) Lebrun
