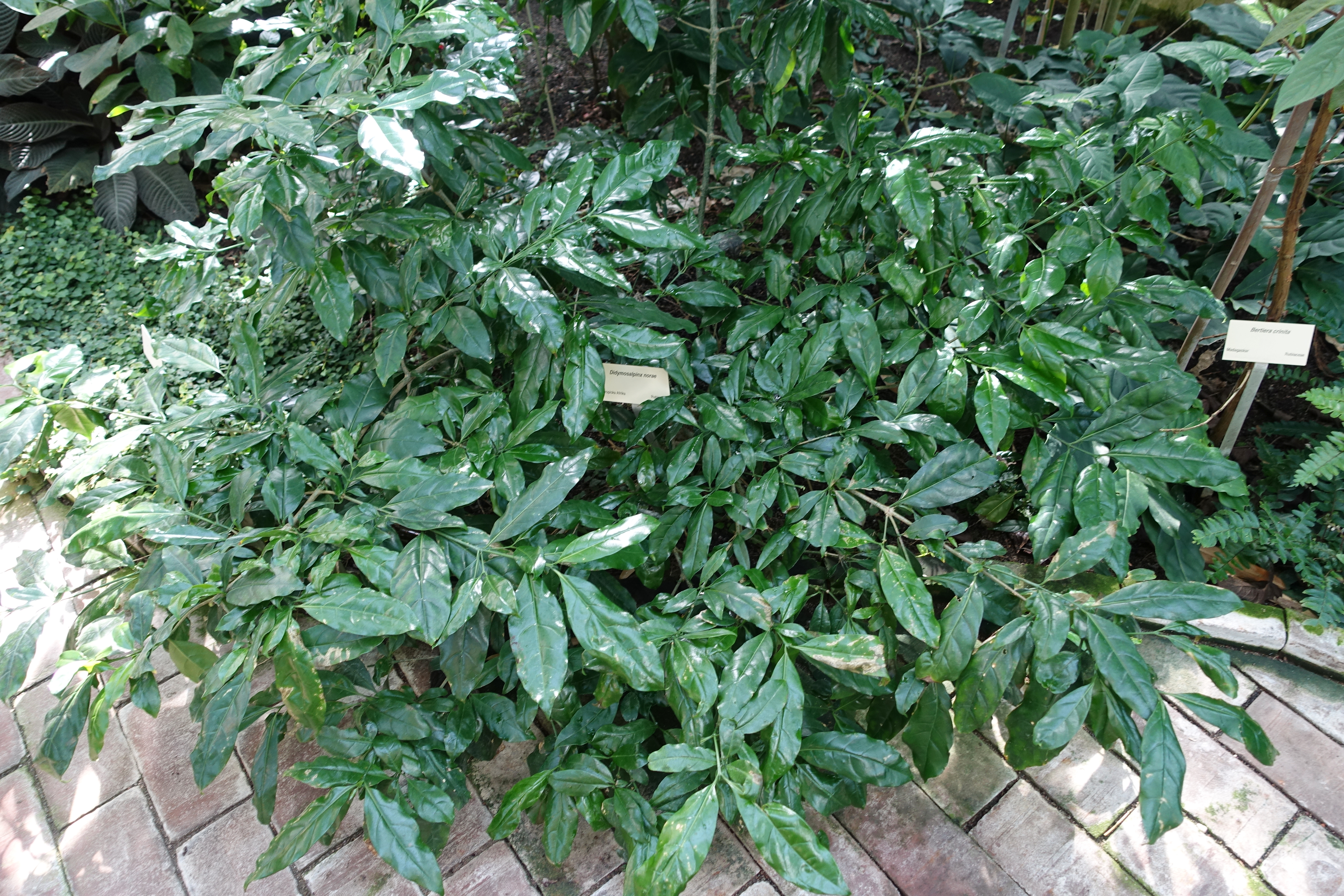
- Didymosalpinx norae

Scientific classification
- Kingdom: Plantae
- Clade: Tracheophytes
- Clade: Angiosperms
- Clade: Eudicots
- Clade: Asterids
- Order: Gentianales
- Family: Rubiaceae
- Genus: Didymosalpinx; Keay

= Didymosalpinx =

Genus of plants

Didymosalpinx is a genus of flowering plants in the family Rubiaceae. The genus is found in tropical Africa.

== Species ==
- Didymosalpinx abbeokutae (Hiern) Keay
- Didymosalpinx callianthus J.E.Burrows & S.M.Burrows
- Didymosalpinx konguensis (Hiern) Keay
- Didymosalpinx lanciloba (S.Moore) Keay
- Didymosalpinx norae (Swynn.) Keay
