= Oncinotis glabrata =

Scientific classification
- Kingdom: Plantae
- Clade: Embryophytes
- Clade: Tracheophytes
- Clade: Spermatophytes
- Clade: Angiosperms
- Clade: Eudicots
- Clade: Asterids
- Order: Gentianales
- Family: Apocynaceae
- Genus: Oncinotis
- Species: O. glabrata

Binomial name
- Oncinotis glabrata (Baill.) Stapf ex Hiern

Synonyms
- Motandra glabrata Baill.; Oncinotis batesii Stapf; Oncinotis glandulosa Stapf; Oncinotis jespersenii De Wild.

Species of plant

Oncinotis glabrata is a plant in the family Apocynaceae. It grows as a climbing shrub or liana up to 50 m (160 ft) long, with a stem diameter of up to 12 cm (4.7 in). Its fragrant flowers feature a yellow to greenish yellow corolla. The fruit consists of paired follicles, each up to 30 cm (12 in) long. Its habitat is forests from sea level to 2,200 m (7,200 ft) altitude. Local medicinal uses include as a treatment for yaws sores. Oncinotis glabrata is native to an area from Guinea in the west to Tanzania in the east and south to Angola.
