= Galiniera saxifraga =

Conservation status
- Least Concern (IUCN 3.1)

Scientific classification
- Kingdom: Plantae
- Clade: Tracheophytes
- Clade: Angiosperms
- Clade: Eudicots
- Clade: Asterids
- Order: Gentianales
- Family: Rubiaceae
- Genus: Galiniera
- Species: G. saxifraga

Binomial name
- Galiniera saxifraga (Hochst.) Bridson

Synonyms
- Pouchetia saxifraga Hochst.; Ptychostigma saxifragum (Hochst.) Hochst.; Galiniera coffeoides Delile

Species of flowering plant

Galiniera saxifraga is a species of tree or small shrub native to the highlands of eastern and central Africa.

== Range and habitat ==
Galiniera saxifraga is an Afromontane species, found in the Ethiopian Highlands and the Eastern Rift highlands of Kenya and Tanzania, the Albertine Rift highlands of Uganda, Democratic Republic of the Congo, Rwanda, Burundi, and Tanzania, and the Southern Rift highlands at the northern end of Lake Malawi in Tanzania, Malawi, and Zambia.

It is mostly found in humid upper montane forests between 1,700 and 3,000 meters elevation, occasionally ranging into lower montane forests down to 760 meters elevation.
