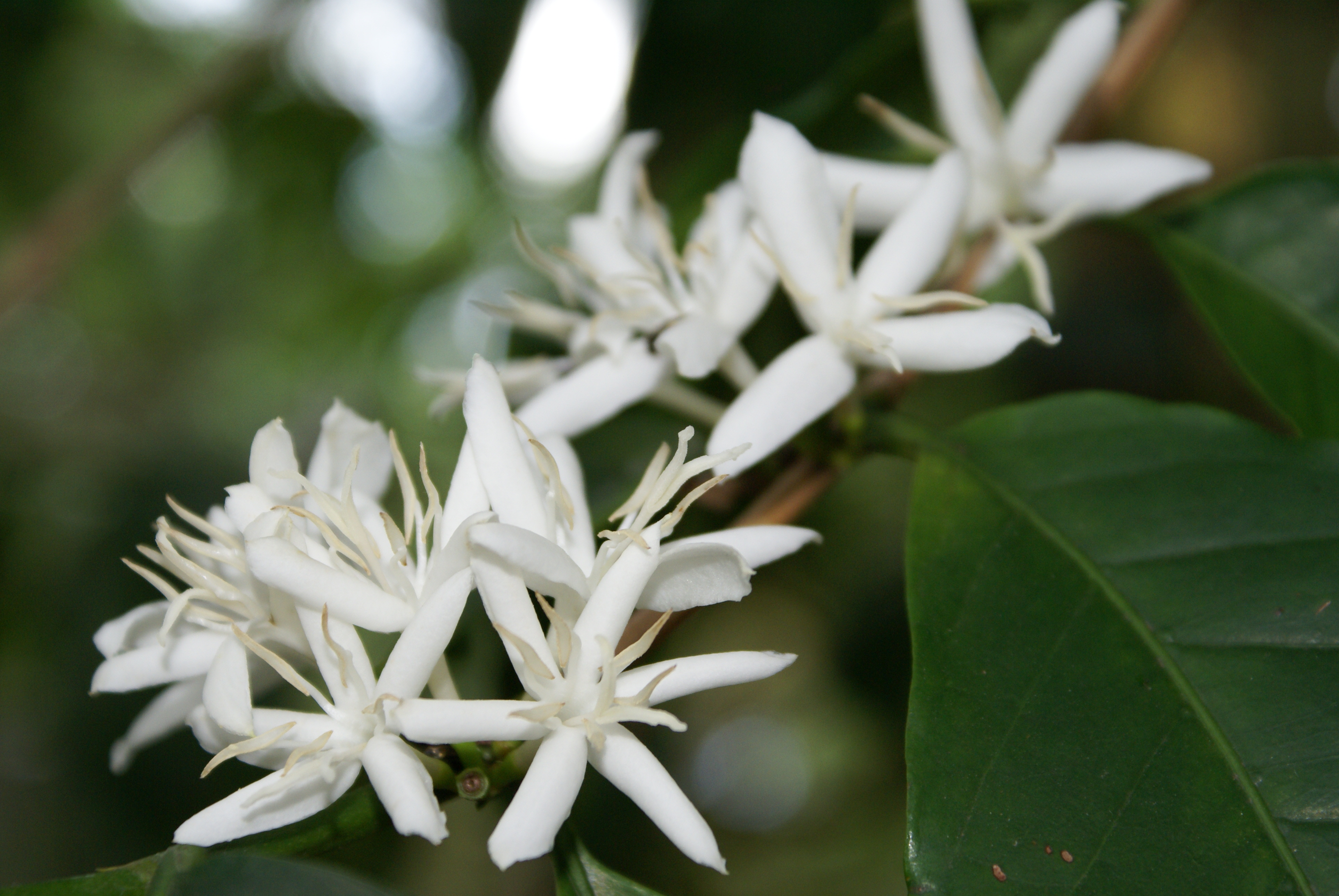
- Coffea arabica

Scientific classification
- Kingdom: Plantae
- Clade: Tracheophytes
- Clade: Angiosperms
- Clade: Eudicots
- Clade: Asterids
- Order: Gentianales
- Family: Rubiaceae
- Subfamily: Ixoroideae
- Tribe: Coffeeae; DC.

Type genus
- Coffea L.

= Coffeeae =

Tribe of flowering plants

Coffeeae is a tribe of flowering plants in the family Rubiaceae and contains about 333 species in 11 genera. Its representatives are found in tropical and southern Africa, Madagascar, the western Indian Ocean, tropical and subtropical Asia, and Queensland.

== Genera ==
Currently accepted names

- Argocoffeopsis Lebrun (8 sp)
- Belonophora Hook.f. (5 sp)
- Calycosiphonia Pierre ex Robbr. (2 sp)
- Coffea L. (137 sp)
- Diplospora DC. (23 sp)
- Discospermum Dalzell (13 sp)
- Empogona Hook.f. (30 sp)
- Kupeantha Cheek (6 sp)
- Nostolachma T.Durand (6 sp)
- Sericanthe Robbr. (22 sp)
- Tricalysia A.Rich. ex DC. (81 sp)

Synonyms

- Argocoffea (Pierre ex De Wild.) Lebrun = Argocoffeopsis
- Bunburya Meisn. ex Hochst. = Tricalysia
- Buseria T.Durand = Coffea
- Cafe Adans. = Coffea
- Cofeanthus A.Chev. = Coffea
- Diplocrater Hook.f. = Tricalysia
- Diplosporopsis Wernham = Belonophora
- Discocoffea A.Chev. = Tricalysia
- Eriostoma Boivin ex Baill. = Tricalysia
- Hexepta Raf. = Coffea
- Hymendocarpum Pierre ex Pit. = Nostolachma
- Kerstingia K.Schum. = Belonophora
- Lachnastoma Korth. = Nostolachma
- Leiochilus Hook.f. = Coffea
- Natalanthe Sond. = Tricalysia
- Neorosea N.Hallé = Tricalysia
- Nescidia A.Rich. ex DC. = Coffea
- Paolia Chiov. = Coffea
- Paracoffea J.-F.Leroy = Coffea
- Pleurocoffea Baill. = Coffea
- Probletostemon K.Schum. = Tricalysia
- Psilanthopsis A.Chev. = Coffea
- Psilanthus Hook.f. = Coffea
- Rosea Klotzsch = Tricalysia
- Solenixora Baill. = Coffea
- Xantonnea Pierre ex Pit. = Discospermum
