= Alire Raffeneau Delile =

French botanist

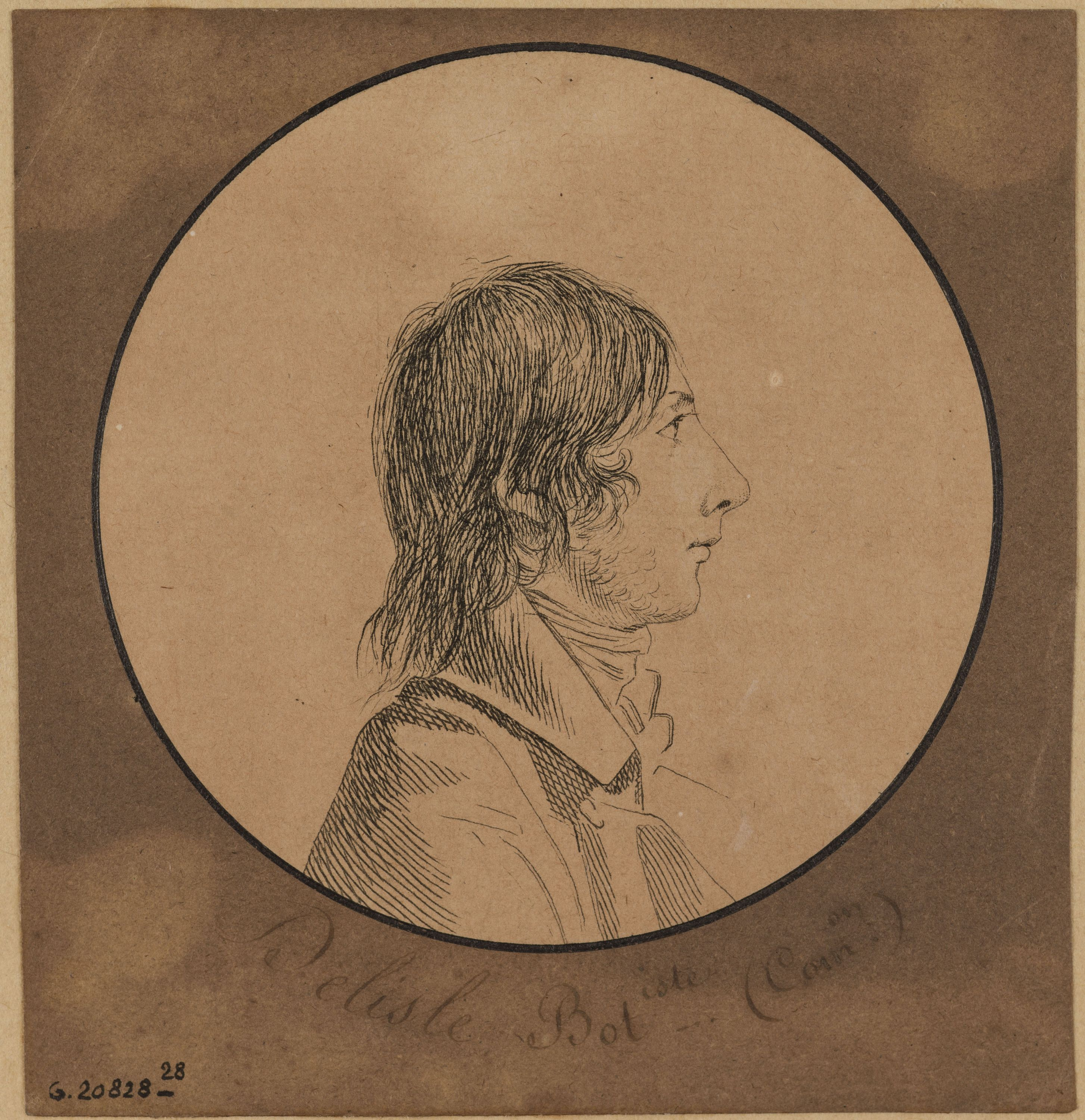
Portrait by André Dutertre, 1798–1801

Alire Raffeneau Delile (23 January 1778, in Versailles – 5 July 1850, in Montpellier) was a French botanist.

== Biography ==
Delile studied botany with Jean Lemonnier, and was in the Paris medical school in 1796.

=== Egypt ===
Delile participated in Napoleon Bonaparte's Egyptian Campaign where he described lotus and papyrus. Director of the Cairo botanical garden, he wrote the botanical sections of Travel in Lower and Upper Egypt by Dominique Vivant. He made a cast of the Rosetta Stone which allowed the reproduction of its Greek and Demotic inscriptions in his Description de l'Égypte.

=== United States ===
In 1802, Delile was appointed French vice consul at Wilmington, North Carolina, and also asked to form an herbarium of all American plants that could be naturalized in France. He sent to Paris several cases of seeds and grains, and discovered some new graminea and presented them to Palisot de Beauvois, who described them in his Agrostographie. Raffeneau made extensive explorations through the neighboring states, and, resigning in 1805, began the study of medicine in New York. During an epidemic of scarlet fever he was active in visiting the tenements of the poor, and in 1807 he obtained the degree of M.D.

=== Return to France ===
He returned to France, and graduated as doctor in medicine from the University of Paris in 1809. In 1819, he was appointed professor of natural history at the University of Montpellier, a post he retained until his death. In 1832, he was named director of the botanical garden in Montpellier. He reports planting two Maclura saplings which can still be found there, and he added many species to its herbarium.

He named some 438 species. He specialized in pteridophytes, mycology, bryophytes and spermatophytes.

In 1853, botanist Godr. published Raffenaldia, a genus of flowering plants from Algeria and Morocco, belonging to the family Brassicaceae. It was named in Alire Raffeneau Delile's honour.

== Works ==
His works include (besides those already cited):

- Sur les effets d'un poison de Java appelé l'upas tieuté, et sur les differentes espèces de strychnos (Paris, 1809)
- Mémoire sur quelques espèces de graminées propres à la Caroline du Nord (Versailles, 1815)
- Centurie des plantes de l'Amérique du Nord (Montpellier, 1820)
- Flore d'Égypte (5 vols., Paris, 1824)
- Centurie des plantes d'Afrique (Paris, 1827)
- De la culture de la patate douce, du crambe maritima et de l'oxalis crenata (Montpellier, 1836)
