= Théophile Alexis Durand =

Belgian botanist

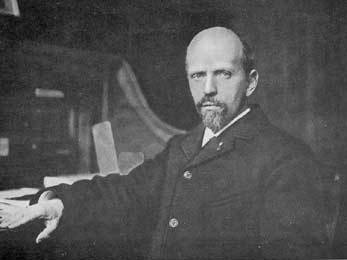
- Born: September 4, 1855
- Died: January 12, 1912 (aged 56)
- Education: University of Liège
- Scientific career
- Fields: Botany
- Author abbrev. (botany): T.Durand

Théophile Alexis Durand (4 September 1855, in Saint-Josse-ten-Noode – 12 January 1912) was a Belgian botanist.

He studied pharmacy at the University of Liège, afterwards travelling to Switzerland, where he befriended botanist Henri François Pittier, with whom he collaborated on studies of Swiss flora. When Pittier later moved to Costa Rica, he provided Durand with dried specimens for study purposes. Both together edited the exsiccata-like series Plantae Costaricenses exsiccatae. Beginning in 1879, he was associated with the National Botanic Garden of Belgium, where in 1901, he succeeded François Crépin as its director. In 1910 he was appointed president of the International Botanical Congress, held in Brussels.

With his daughter, illustrator Hélène Durand, he published "Sylloge Florae Congolanae" (1909). He also made significant contributions to the "Index Kewensis" (first supplement, 1901–1906). Some plants with the specific epithet of durandii commemorate his name, an example being Celtis durandii (family Cannabaceae).

== Selected works ==
- Catalogue de la flore liégeoise, 1878.
- "Index generum phanerogamorum", 1888.
- "Primitiae florae costaricensis", 1891–1901 (with Henri François Pittier).
- Matériaux pour la flore du Congo, 1897–1901 (with Émile Auguste Joseph De Wildeman).
- "Conspectus floræ Africæ, ou Énumération des plantes d'Afrique", 1895–1898 (with Hans Schinz).
- "Sylloge florae congolanae [Phanerogamae]" 1909.
