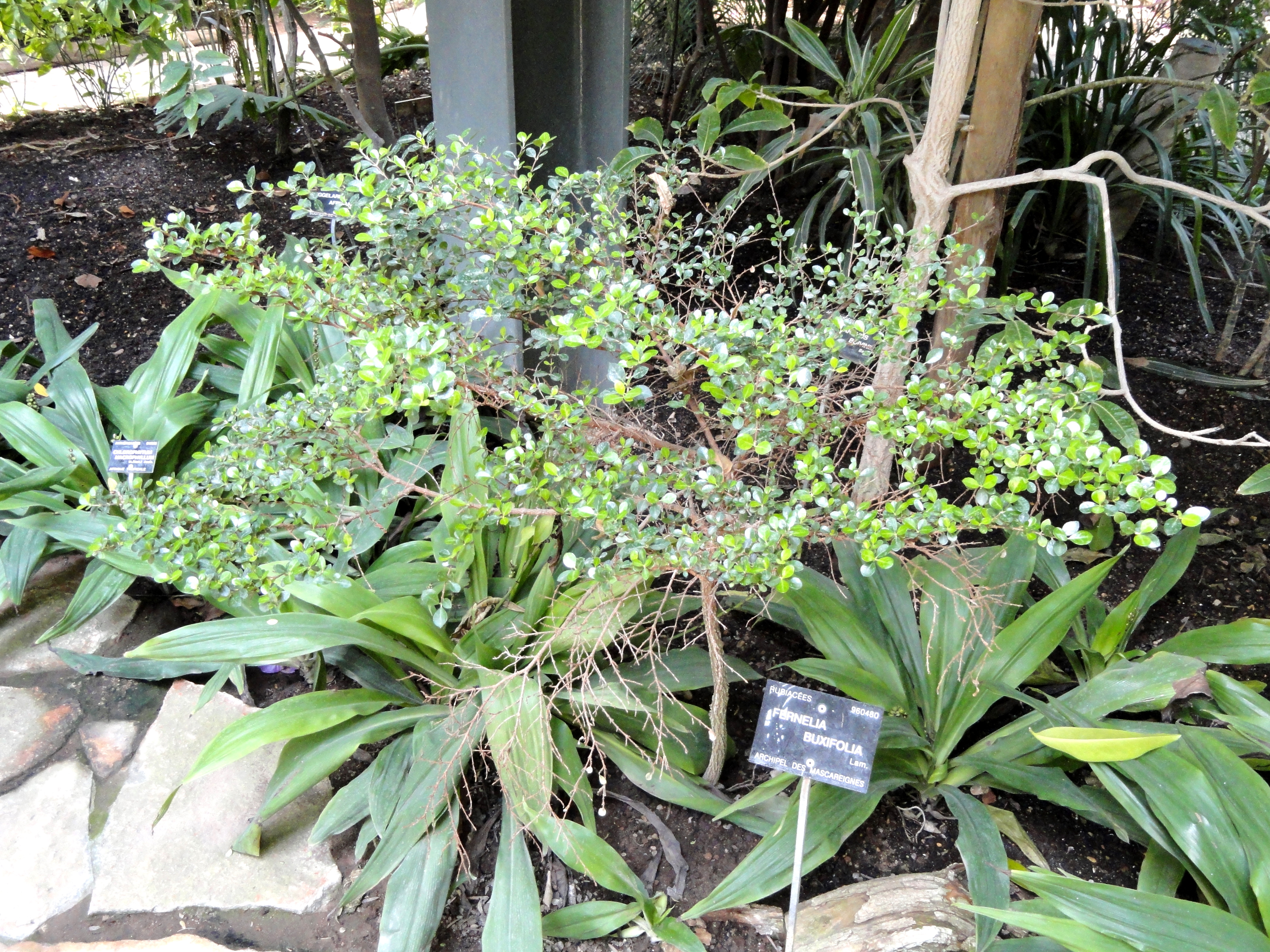
- A specimen from the Jardin botanique de Lyon

Scientific classification
- Kingdom: Plantae
- Clade: Tracheophytes
- Clade: Angiosperms
- Clade: Eudicots
- Clade: Asterids
- Order: Gentianales
- Family: Rubiaceae
- Genus: Fernelia
- Species: F. buxifolia

Binomial name
- Fernelia buxifolia Lam.

Synonyms
- Coccocypselum buxifolium (Lam.) Spreng., Syst. Veg. 1: 416 (1824); Fernelia mauritiana J.F.Gmel., Syst. Nat.: 244 (1791)

= Fernelia buxifolia =

Species of plant

Fernelia buxifolia is a shrub belonging to the family Rubiaceae. It is found in the Mascarene Islands of Mauritius, Réunion, and Rodrigues.
