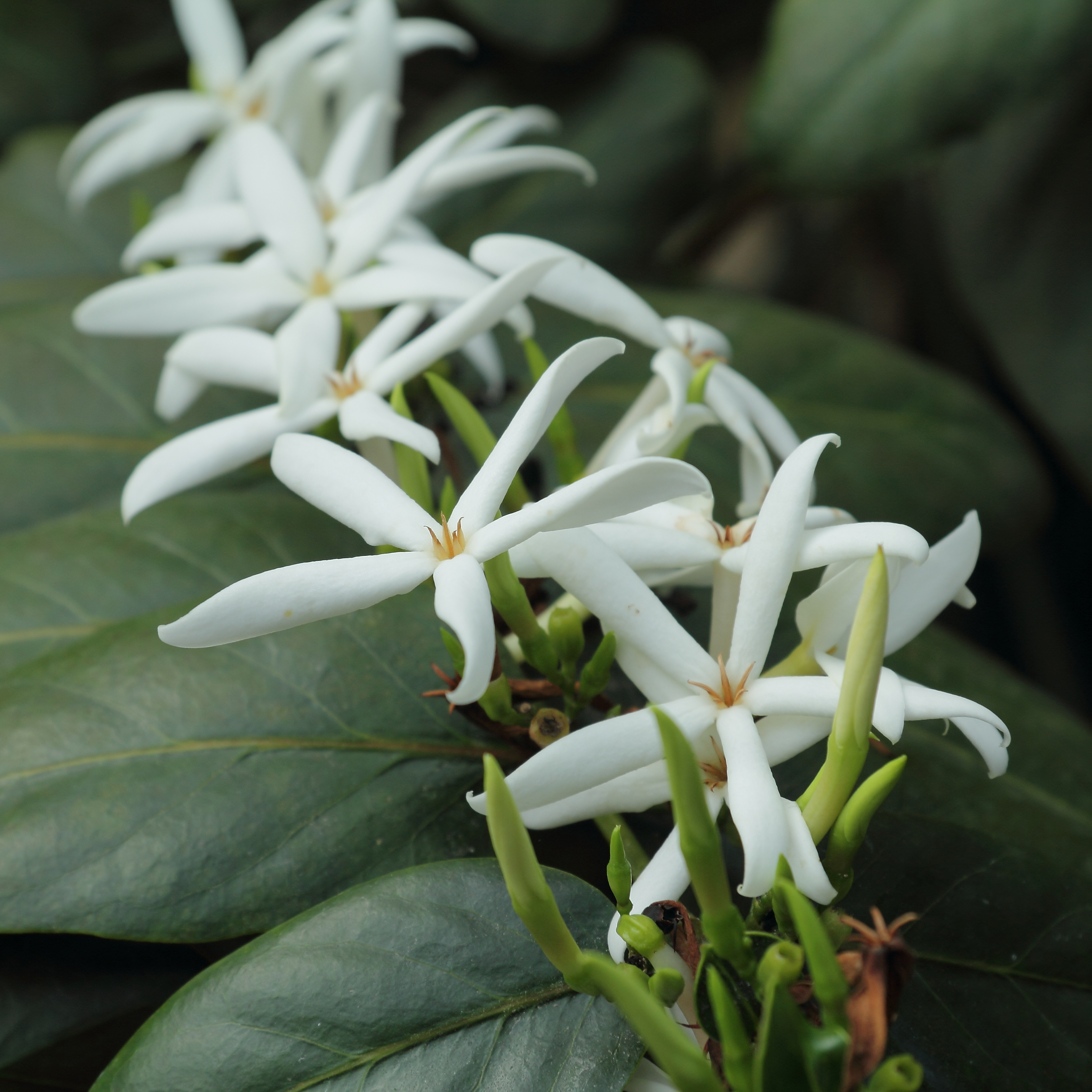
- In cultivation at Kew Gardens

Conservation status
- Critically Endangered (IUCN 2.3)

Scientific classification
- Kingdom: Plantae
- Clade: Tracheophytes
- Clade: Angiosperms
- Clade: Eudicots
- Clade: Asterids
- Order: Gentianales
- Family: Rubiaceae
- Genus: Ramosmania
- Species: R. rodriguesii

Binomial name
- Ramosmania rodriguesii Tirveng.
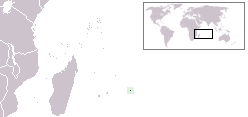
- It is endemic to Rodrigues

= Ramosmania rodriguesii =

Species of plant

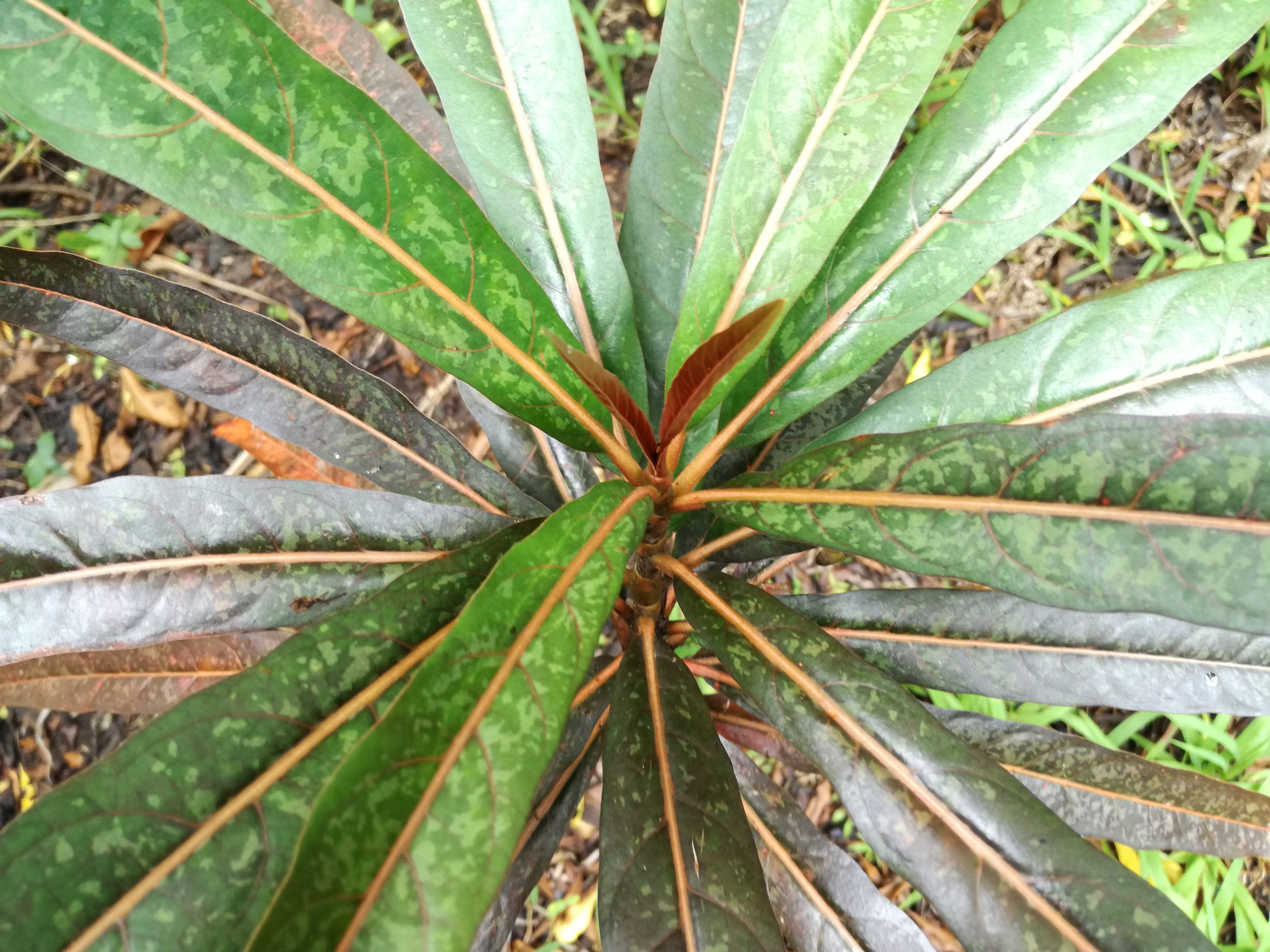
Young R. rodriguesii plant with "elliptic obtuse" leaves

Ramosmania rodriguesii, commonly known as café marron, is a tree native to the Mauritian island of Rodrigues in the Indian Ocean. The plant has an average size of about 5 to 6 feet (1.5 to 1.8 m) and features white five-petal star-shaped flowers. Its French common name café marron translates to "brown coffee."

== Description ==
Ramosmania rodriguesii is a heterophyllous shrub or tree with stringy, juvenile leaves with an obtuse, rounded apex and mature leaves with a rounded, almost truncated apex. The petals' tube is funnel-shaped and leathery with a length of 1 centimeter. The plant's fruit is thin and elongated. Additionally, R. rodriguesii have smooth midribs as opposed to their hairy counterpart, R. heterophylla. The species is also heterophyllous, meaning that they have both young leaves growing at the bottom of the plant while there are adult leaves on the top half of the plant.

=== Cytology ===
The diploid chromosome count is 2n = 22.

== Taxonomy ==
It was described by Deva D. Tirvengadum in 1989. R. rodriguesii is in the same Rubiaceae family as the now extinct R. heterophylla which used to reside on Rodrigues. D.D. Tirvengadum originally thought that R. heterophylla and R. rodriguesi were the same species, until he noted that the shape of the R. rodriguesi leaves were "elliptic obtuse" in comparison to those of R. heterophylla. It was identified as the sister group to the genus Fernelia Comm. ex Lam.

== Distribution and habitat ==
R. rodriguesii can only survive in tropical temperatures of 19-23 °C with 70-80% humidity. The plants do not have a preference for shade or light, though flowering occurs more so when shaded.

== Ecology ==
Moths pollinate the plant while Rodrigues flying foxes spread the seeds. These pollinators are less endangered than R. rodriguesii, therefore their absence is not expected to be a problem when the species is reintroduced to Rodrigues. R. rodriguesii's female flowers develop after male flowers, indicating that the plant is protandrous. The appearances of the young plant and its adult counterpart are drastically different, likely meant to deter predators from eating the young plant before it matures and reproduces.

== Conservation ==
Ramosmania rodriguesii was assessed as a Critically Endangered species in 1998. It was thought Ramosmania rodriguesii was extinct until a single surviving tree was spotted by a schoolboy in 1979, who was shown a drawing of the plant by his teacher. The only image of the plant was made in 1877, by a European visitor, passing through Rodrigues. By the 1950s, it was presumed to be extinct. In the 1970s, a specimen was discovered. Cuttings were taken to Kew Gardens, and one plant survived the journey. The plant flowered regularly in cultivation but failed to set fruit within a 20 year period. The horticulturist Carlos Magdalena experimented with the vegetatively propagated plants and cultivated them under various conditions. The plants that experienced a heat shock after being placed on a heater developed fertile female flowers with elongate pistils. In 2003, the café marron bore its first fruit with viable seeds. Slow but steady efforts have been made to grow more café marron trees and speed up the pollination process. Within the same year, the wild plant in Rodrigues also set fruit without any outside intervention. In 2010, there were 300 successfully germinated seeds in Rodrigues, spreading hope that the species can eventually exist in the wild once again.

The species' most prevalent threats are predators, poaching, pests, and habitat loss. Giant tortoises are R. rodriguesii's primary predator and they feast on young, low-hanging leaves. Researchers hypothesized that in response to the predation of giant tortoises, the species' young leaves evolved to appear darker and therefore less appealing or visible to the tortoises. Other notable predators are the dodo-descendant, Rodrigues solitaire, and goats. Poaching is also extremely damaging to the species. The urban legend associated with the plant contributed significantly to the amount of poaching because people wanted to use the plant to cure their hangovers and liver diseases. Mealybugs are known pests for R. rodriguesii and they do not harm the plant unless they become infested, which disrupts development. Many locals of Rodrigues subscribed to the belief that R. rodriguesii had the potential to remedy venereal diseases and cure hangovers. This is how the plant gained its nickname, café marron. Subsequently, many people cut pieces from the plant and inhibited its further cultivation, which turned out to be a considerable factor in the species' endangerment.
