= Vacherie du Parc =

Former municipal dairy in Lyon, France

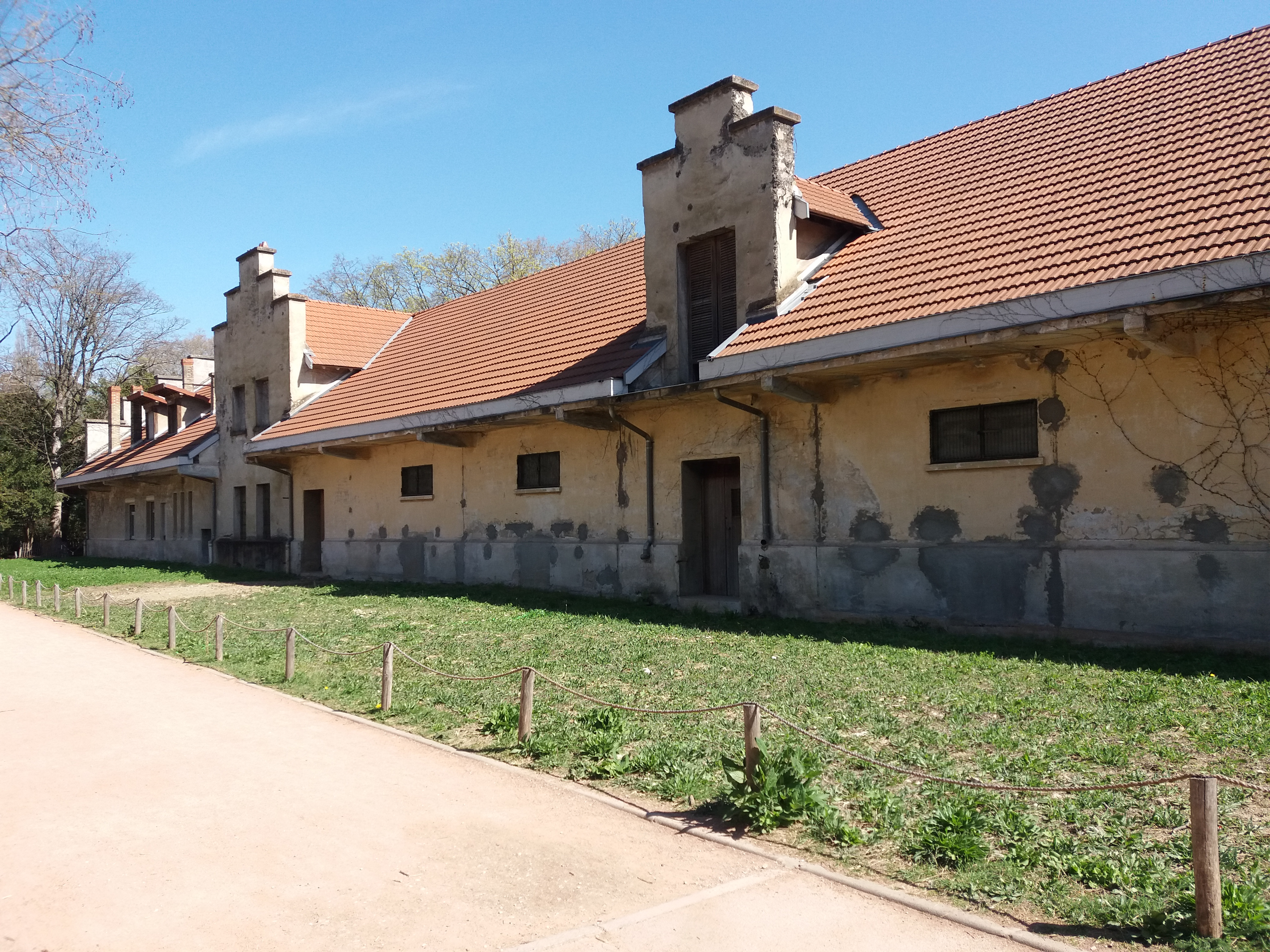
- View of the building in March 2019.
- Interactive map of the Vacherie du Parc area

General information
- Type: Dairy and stable
- Location: allée du Parc aux Moutons, Lyon commune, Rhône department, Auvergne-Rhône-Alpes region., France
- Coordinates: 45°46′37″N 4°51′23″E
- Year built: 1904-1905
- Owner: Municipality of the Lyon commune

Design and construction
- Architect: Tony Garnier

The Vacherie du Parc is a former municipal dairy located along the Allée des Moutons in the Lyon Zoo, in the heart of the Parc de la Tête d'Or in Lyon, France. It was designed by the architect Tony Garnier following a commission from the city of Lyon. It was intended to provide milk for Lyon's orphans, and included a stable, a milk pasteurization facility, and accommodation for the cowherds.

The cow farm was not efficient enough and was closed in 1919 when it was transferred to the Agricultural school of Cibeins in Misérieux. After being converted into a rearing house in the 1920s, the building is now an administrative building.

== History ==
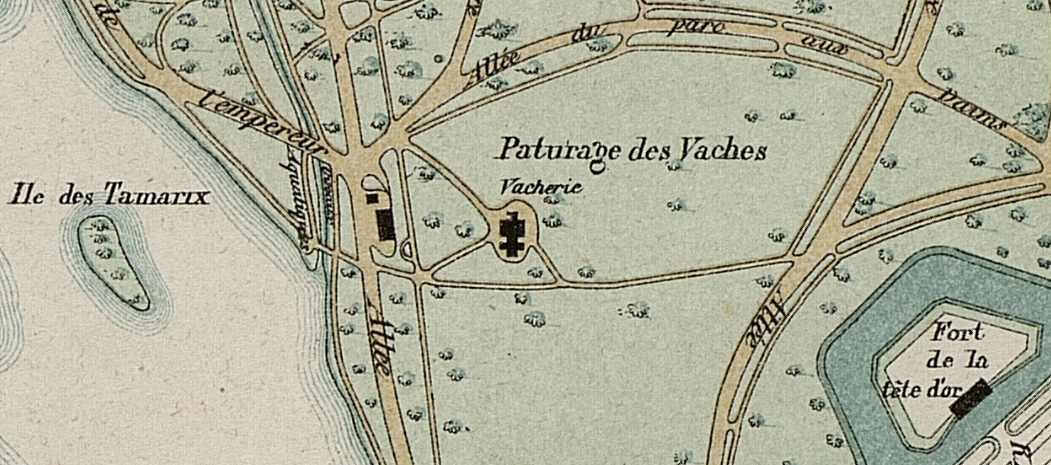
Location of the former cow farm, to the south of the lake (north is on the left).

Shortly after the opening of the Parc de la Tête d'Or in 1857, following the introduction of fallow deer for the creation of the zoo, cows and sheep were brought in to maintain the lawns. From 1861 onwards, the cows' milk was sold on the Place Bellecour.

Built from wood and thatch, it was destroyed by fire in 1871. In 1904, Mayor Jean-Victor Augagneur launched the construction of a new building to produce milk closer to Lyon. He first approached Auguste Duret, who proposed a U-shaped plan with a lot of ornamentation. (Note: Duret's project was valued at 89,000 francs.) But the town council deemed it too costly. Tony Garnier submitted a simpler, and therefore much more affordable, proposal in August 1904. (Note: Garnier's project was valued at 70,744 francs.)

This was the first of many commissions for Tony Garnier by the city of Lyon. The design was taken from the agricultural establishments in his Cité Industrielle. The cow farm went into service as soon as work was completed at the end of 1906.

The building was well received by the city, enabling Victor Augagneur to recommend Tony Garnier to the new mayor, Édouard Herriot.

The possibility of extensions was foreseen from the outset of the project, allowing the sterilization section to be enlarged during construction. Between 1912 and 1913, Tony Garnier built two flats for the cowherds in the attic above the sterilization room and added a third by raising an annex building. (Note: Tony Garnier designed them in February 1912, and the work was handed over in April 1913.)

Plans of Tony Garnier's cow farm

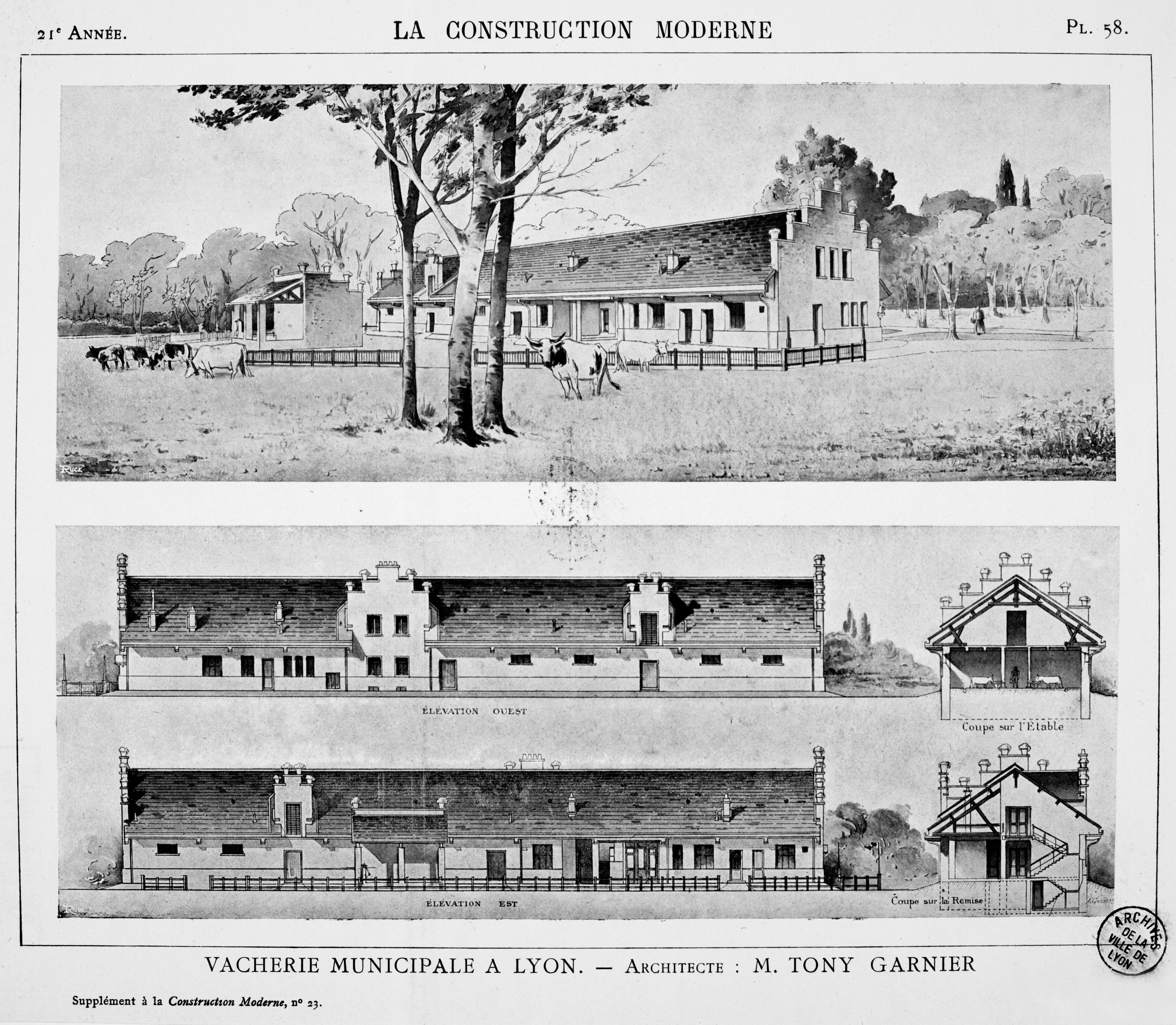

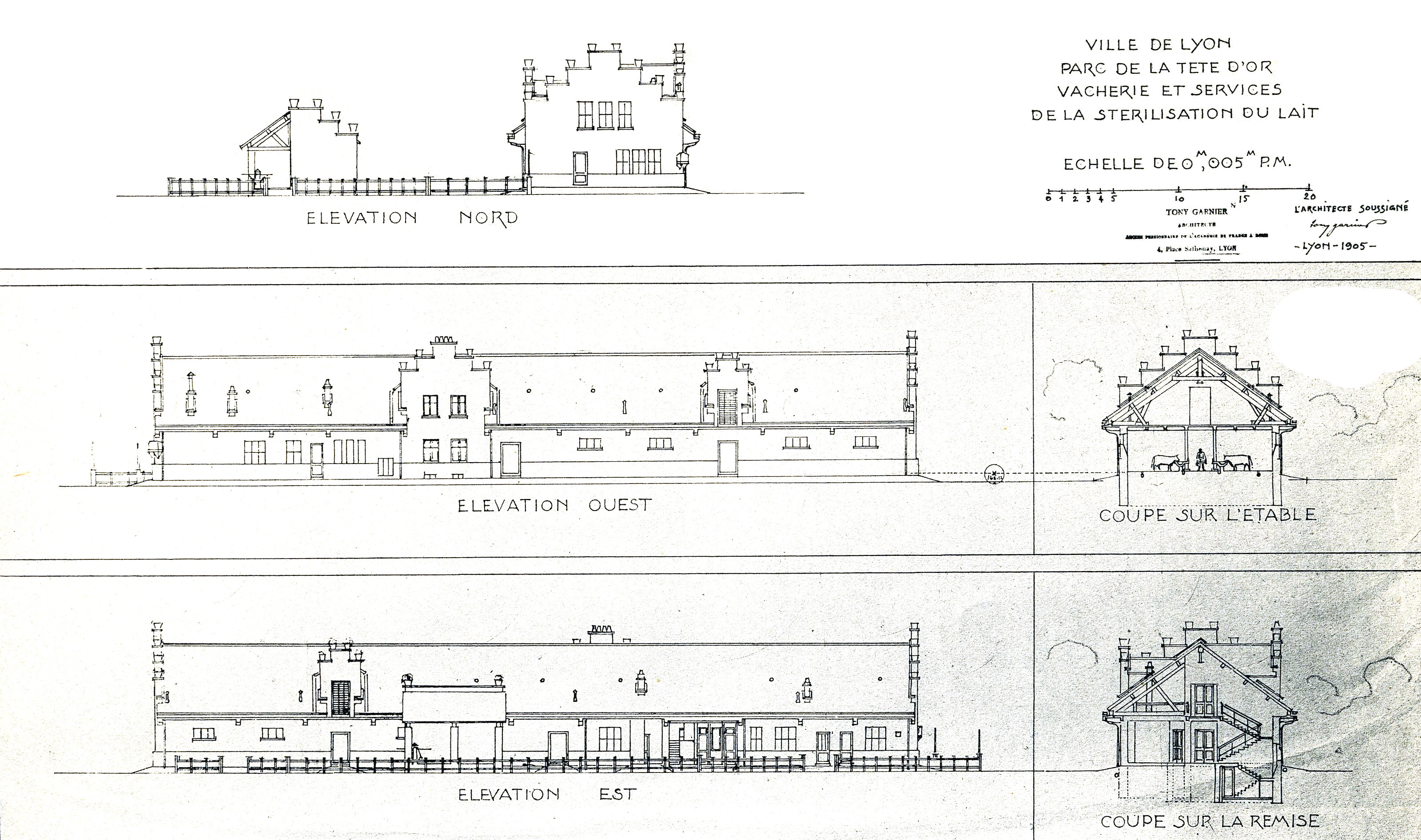

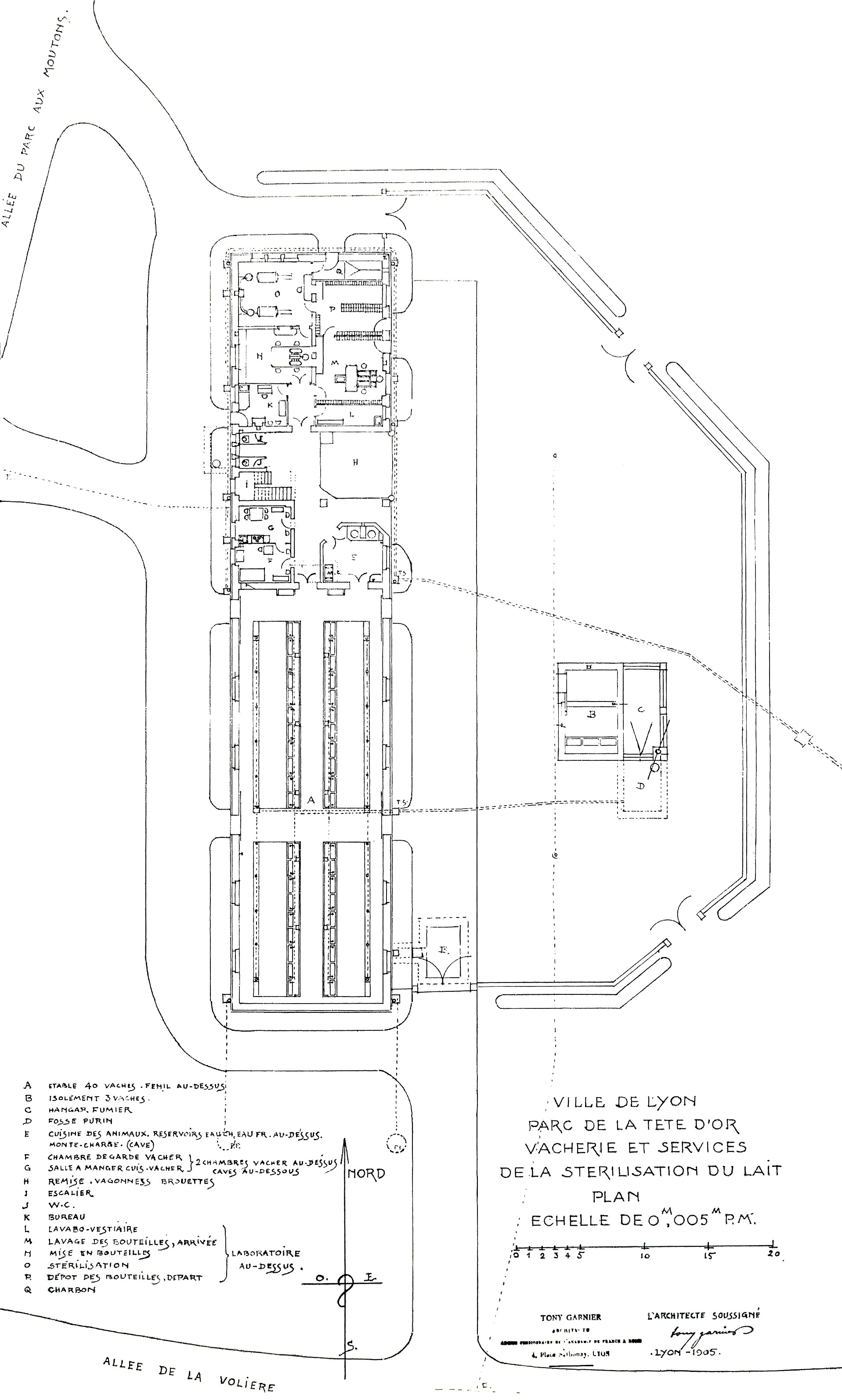

Its production was insufficient from the beginning: in 1911, it housed 34 cows, but could not accommodate any more; the town asked for a second cow farm. It was closed on June 16, 1919. The dairy was then transferred to the Cibeins agricultural school in Misérieux.

Cibeins School of Agriculture

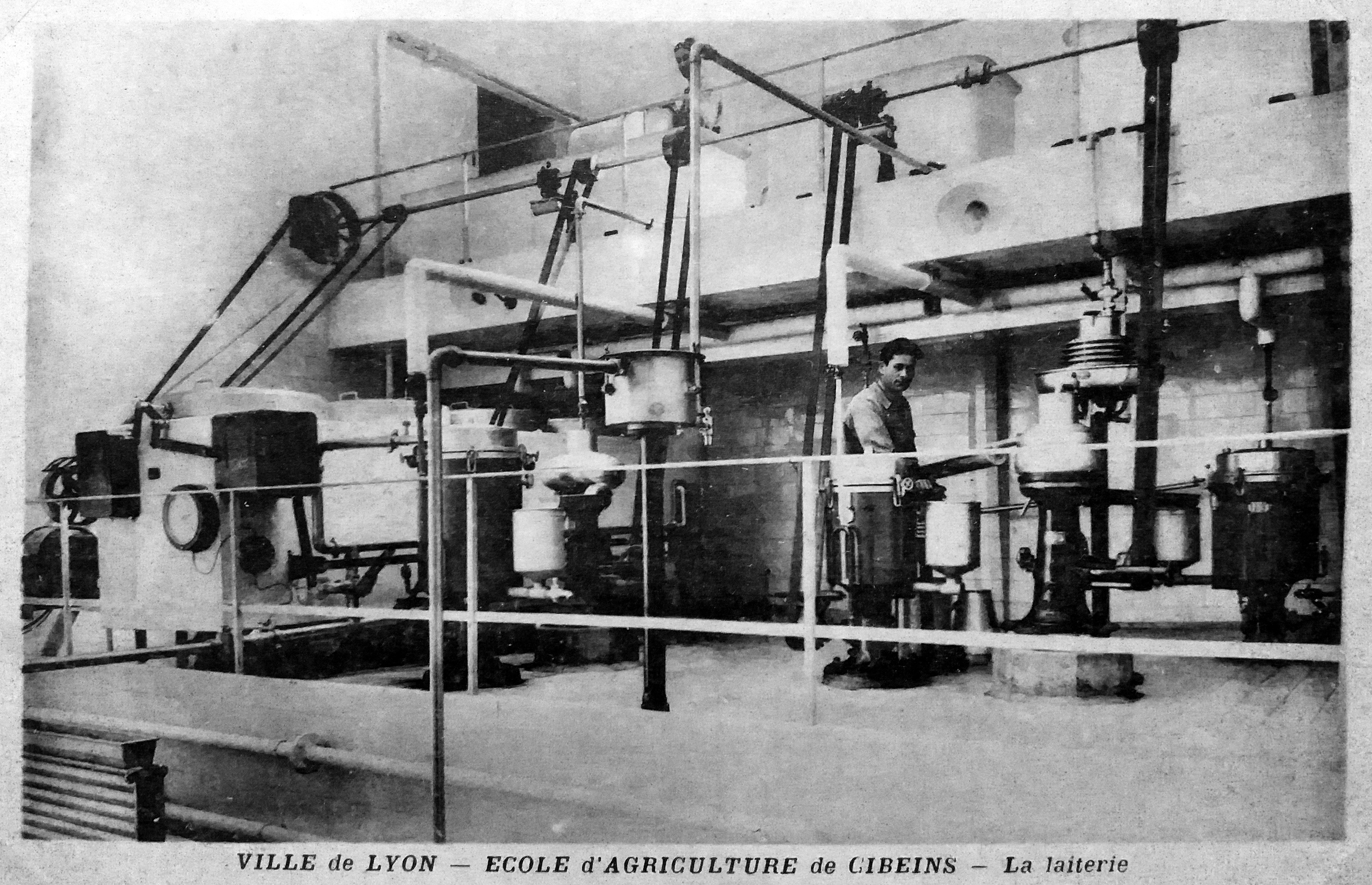
Cellar and dairy

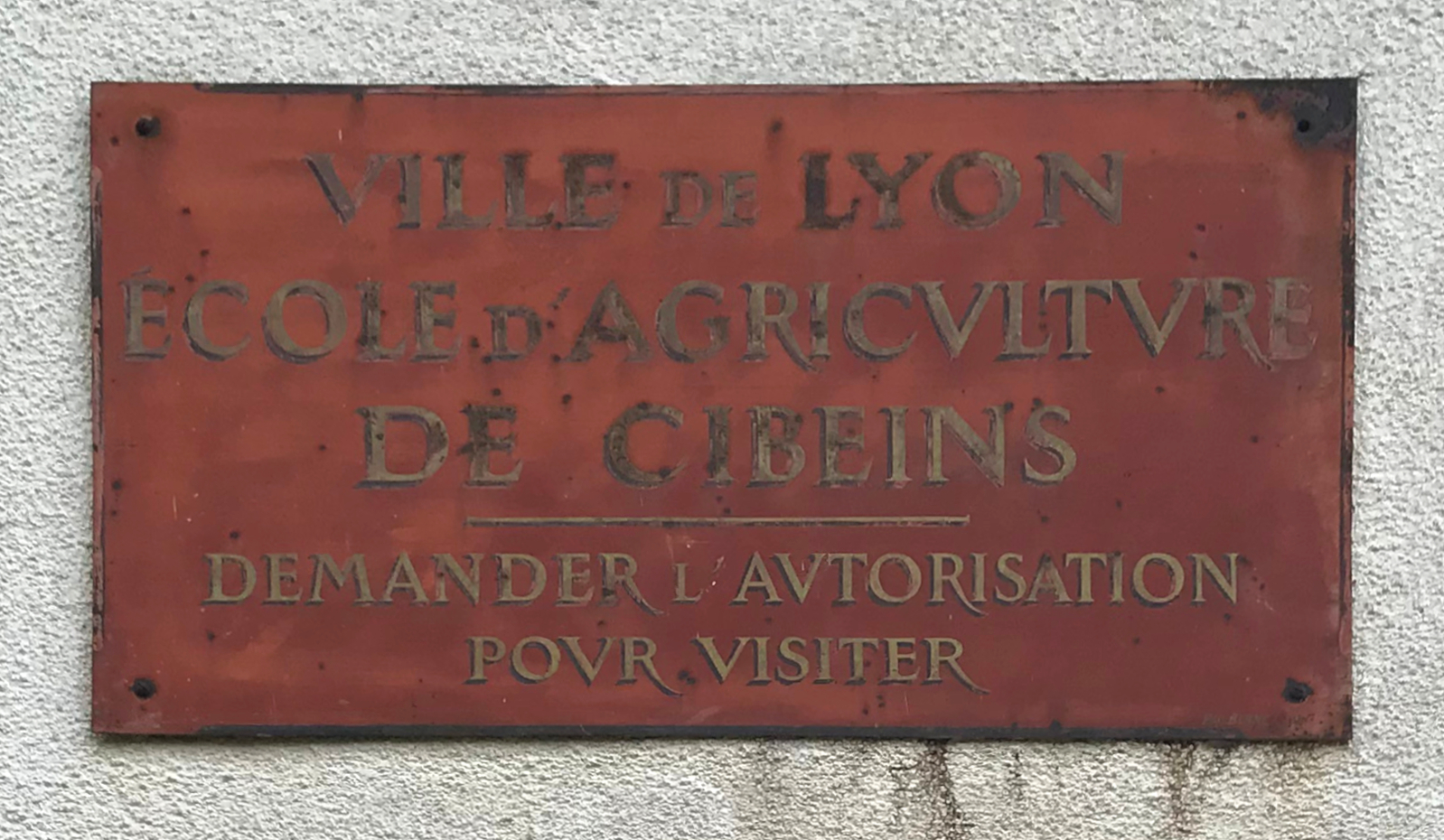
Lyon City Plaque

The cow barn was then refurbished between 1922 and 1924 and transformed into a fawn house, with the addition of two cages on the east side of the building. An adjoining enclosure was created for the Indochinese elephant Loulou, (Note: Loulou was a 9-year-old elephant presented by the French colony of Saigon to Édouard Herriot, President of the Council of Ministers. He arrived in Marseille by liner on October 13th 1924.) who lived in the park for 15 years. Disused and abandoned in the 1980s, the building was used as a storeroom. Although it is neither listed nor included in the Supplementary Inventory of Historic Monuments, it is considered to be of undoubted heritage interest. Its restoration was therefore envisaged at the end of the 1990s as part of a study into the park's heritage as a whole. On January 29, 2001, the city of Lyon voted to restructure the building to give it "the presence it deserves", at a cost of 14 million francs, (Note: At the same time, the renovation of the Lambert farmhouse, built in 1735, is being considered at a cost of 11 million francs.) and to reallocate it to the operation of the Parc de la Tête d'Or, including a large storage area, an exhibition room, a classroom, a cold room, and the reptile enclosure.

== Description ==
The Vacherie has a ground floor and an attic floor, with a total surface area of 1,275 m^{2}. It was designed by Tony Garnier as a utilitarian building that blends in harmoniously with the park. It includes a stable for 40 cows, a sterilization plant and, between the two, a dwelling for the cowherd from which he can observe the animals through an embrasure. An isolation barn for three sick cows is set aside in the courtyard.

The whole complex is built in one piece, with gables and pediments similar to the villas he had designed to build on the edge of the park. The ground floor of the main building is made of reinforced concrete with a Portland cement screed, while the floors of the outbuildings are made of clinker and hydraulic lime. The walls are made of adobe and hydraulic lime. Finally, the floors and walls are whitewashed to make them waterproof. The whole building is covered in red Burgundy tiles. There is also a basement for storing foodstuffs and a hayloft under the roof: this space for storing fodder may have forced Garnier to build the only traditional roof in his architectural work.

The architect paid particular attention to hygiene, including ventilation, automatic urine drainage, and a glazed brick floor. The milk sterilization unit is a modern technology, included in the project from the beginning by Mayor Augagneur, a medical officer of health, who wanted to provide disadvantaged young people with quality milk. The city wanted to control the entire chain, from production to distribution. The troughs in the barn were made of cement, with hot and cold water taps and pipes for draining off the water and manure.

The only decorations Tony Garnier allowed himself were the terracotta pots on the eaves of the roof, as well as a wall of ivy and an enclosure hedge.

« This atypical, unique work was nevertheless produced in a style that Garnier used for several other projects: a mixture of regionalism and eclecticism, and sometimes of late Art Nouveau. » — Olivier Cinqualbre (architect and museum curator).

Cibeins School of Agriculture

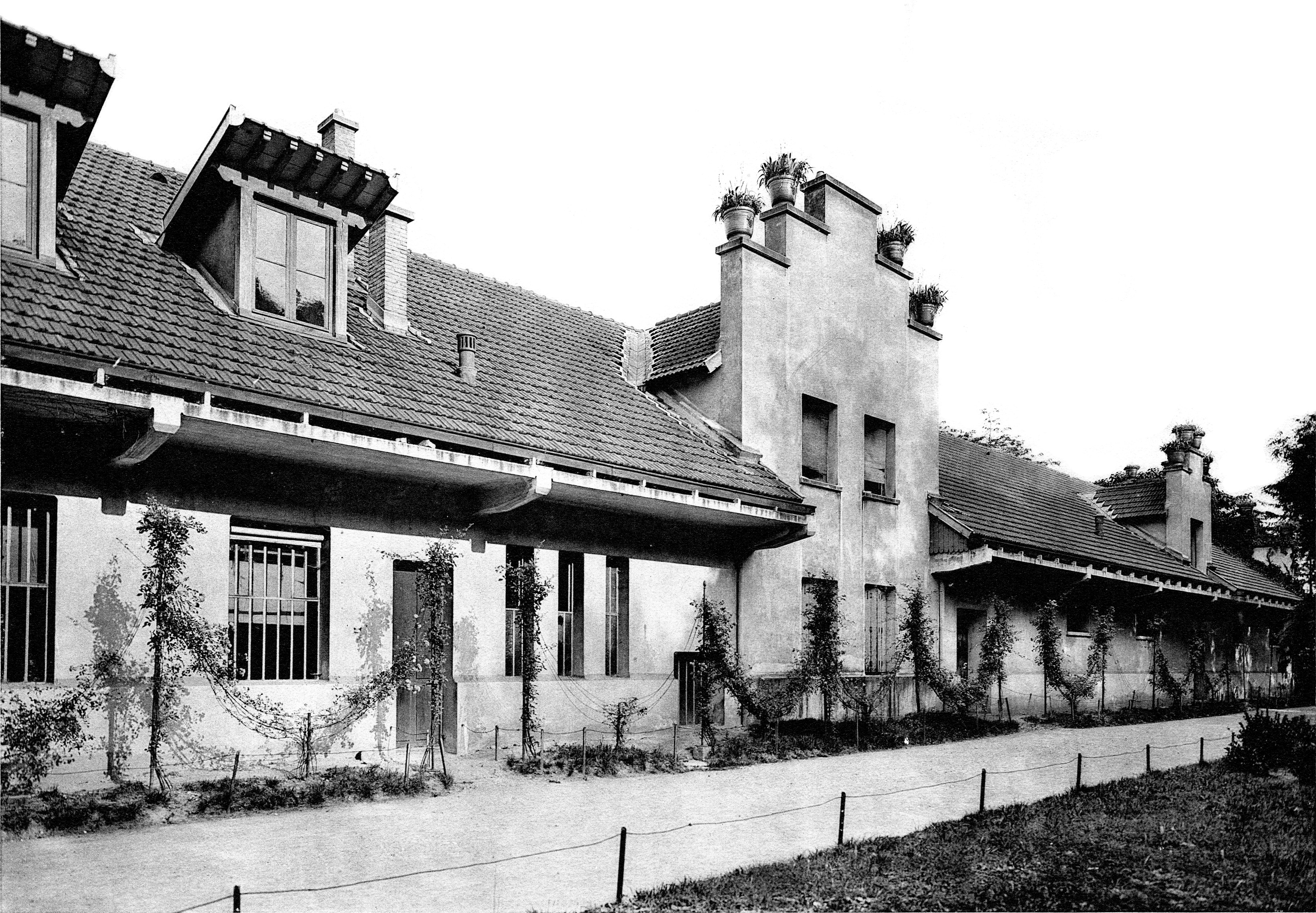
West Façade

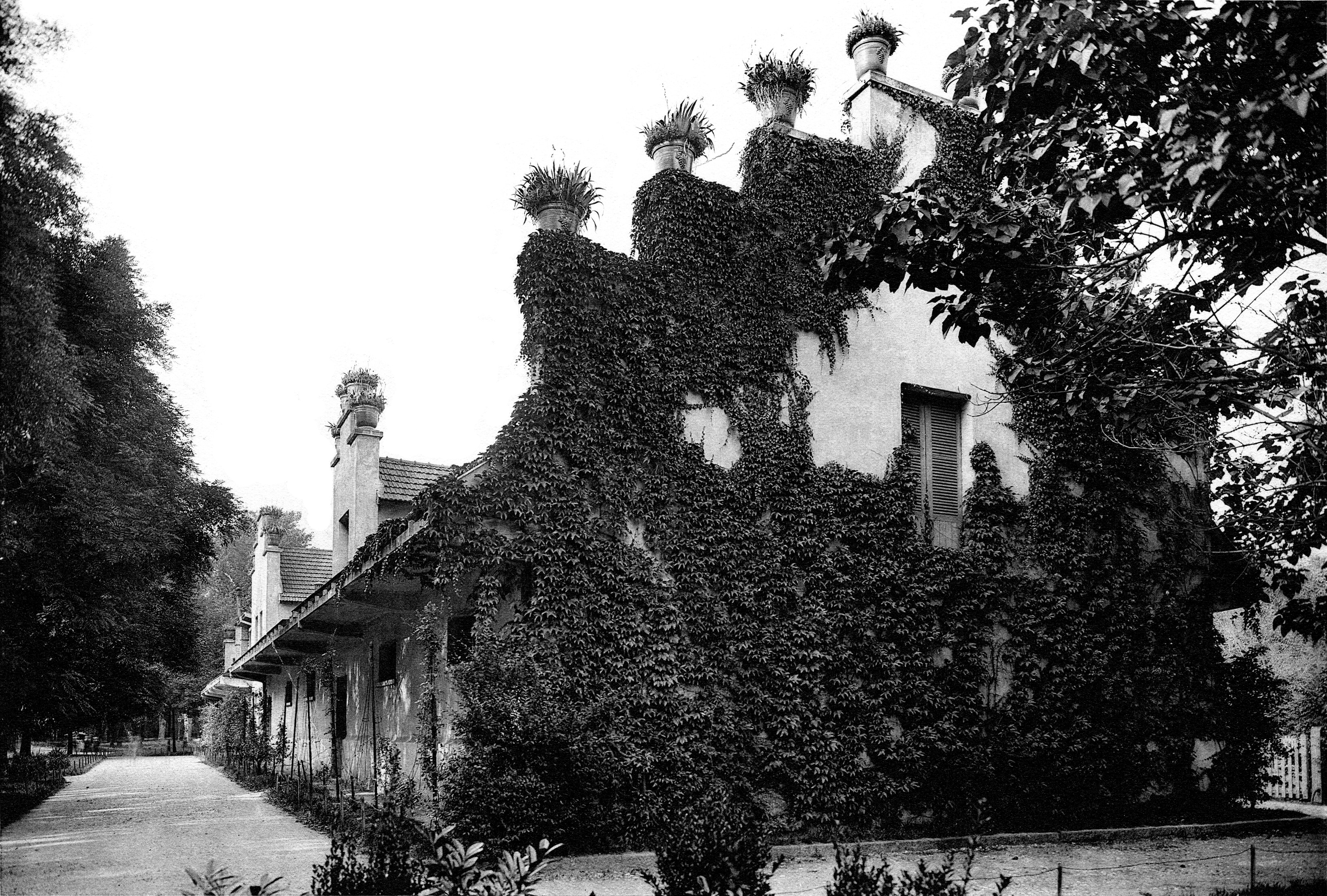
South side

Hay barn (hayloft)

=== Production ===
The dairy is able to supply 250 to 300 liters of milk a day, (Note: At that time, Lyon's milk consumption varied between 80 and 130 tonnes per day, depending on the season.) thanks to a number of devices that automate the process: one machine brushes and cleans the bottles with a jet of water, while another makes it easier to fill them. Finally, twoautoclaves are used to sterilize around 2,000 125 ml bottles every day. The milk is transported by car to 8 local nurseries.

== Milk pasteurisation plant project ==
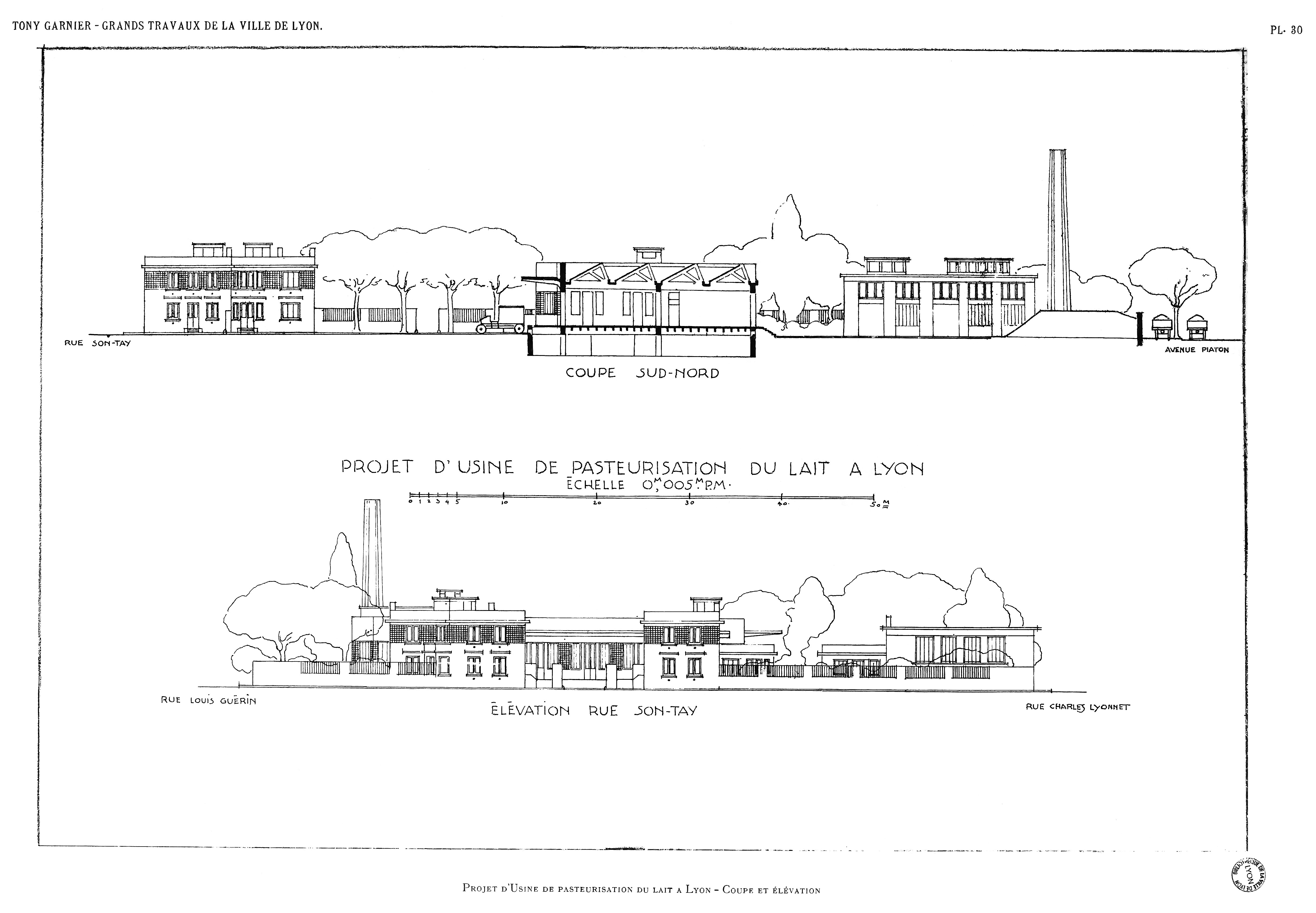
Plans for the new factory.

In 1918, Tony Garnier drew up two plans for a milk pasteurization plant, which appeared to be an extension of the cow farm's sterilization unit. The complex, planned for a nearby plot in Villeurbanne, was imposing: it was almost like a housing estate, comprising several administrative buildings, a laboratory, workshops, a garage, and a technical building.

The plans feature a large chimney, shed roofs concealed by an attic, and concrete architecture similar to that of the Cité Industrielle, with a special feature: a frieze that could be made of faience tiles around the attics.

== See also ==
=== Bibliography ===
- Louis Faivre d'Arcier (dir.), Mourad Laangry and Stéphanie Rojas-Perrin (Lyon Municipal Archives exhibition catalogue from October 15, 2019, to March 21, 2020), Tony Garnier, l'œuvre libre : Le maire et l'architecte, Lyon, Lyon Municipal Archives, December 2019, 304 p. ISBN 979-10-699-4045-1
- Alain Guiheux (dir.) and Olivier Cinqualbre (dir.) (Published on the occasion of the exhibition "Tony Garnier (1869-1948)" presented by the Centre de Création Industrielle from March 7 to May 21, 1990), Tony Garnier: L'œuvre complète, Paris, Centre Pompidou, coll. "Monographie", 1989, 254 p. ISBN 2-85850-527-6, p. 60-61.
- René Jullian, Tony Garnier : Constructeur et utopiste, Paris, Philippe Sers, 1989, 180 p. ISBN 2-904057-25-0, pp. 80–81.
- Corentin Durand, Mourad Laangry and Catherine Dormont, "Tony Garnier : Guide des sources présentes aux Archives municipales de Lyon " archive [PDF], in Archives municipales de Lyon, November 1, 2019 (accessed November 24th 2019), p. 14-15.
- Louis Piessat (pref. Paul Dufournet), Tony Garnier : 1869-1948, Lyon, Presses Universitaires de Lyon, 1988, 196 p. ISBN 2-7297-0338-1, p. 77-78.
- Justin Godart (pref. Édouard Herriot, reprinted 1979), Travailleurs et métiers lyonnais, Lyon, Cumin et Masson, 1909, 414 p., p. 343-348.
- Xavier de Merona (pref. Louis Bourgeois), Richesses du parc de la Tête d'or, Trévoux, Éditions de Trévoux, 1987, 83 p. ISBN 2-85698-040-6, p. 37-38.
- Tête d'Or: Un parc d'exception créé par Denis Bühler (Exhibition presented from 3 July to 3 October 1992 at the Orangerie du Parc de la Tête d'Or), Lyon, CAUE du Rhône, 1992, 48 p. ISBN 2-9503336-2-1, p. 24.
- "La vacherie municipale au Parc de la Tête-d'Or", La Construction lyonnaise, no. 11, June 1, 1906, pp. 125–128 ISSN 2021-1945, read online archive).
- "La vacherie municipale au Parc de la Tête-d'Or", La Construction lyonnaise, no 3, February 1, 1905, p. 33 ISSN 2021-1945, read online archive).
- "Construction d'une vacherie au Parc de la Tête-d'Or", La Construction lyonnaise, no 22, November 16, 1904, p. 265 ISSN 2021-1945, read online archive).
- Isabelle Brione, "Des restructurations importantes au parc de la Tête d'Or", Le Progrès, January 31, 2001.
- Aline Duret, "En 1870, le parc de la Tête d'or échappe au désastre" archive, in Le Progrès, August 17, 2016 (accessed November 24th, 2019).
- "Une étude sur l'architecture", Le Progrès, January 11, 1998.
- Paul Saint-Olive (Cinquantième congrès de l'association française pour l'avancement des sciences), Lyon 1906-1926: Introduction historique, enseignement, mouvement artistique, littéraire et scientifique, la vie sociale, la production, la foire internationale de Lyon, Lyon, Société anonyme de l'imprimerie A. Rey, 1926, "Le Marché du Lait", pp. 491–495.
- "Loulou", the young elephant presented to Mr Herriot, arrived yesterday from Saigon", Le Petit Provençal, October 14, 1924.

=== Related articles ===
- fr:Monument aux morts de l'île du Souvenir
- fr:Abattoirs de la Mouche
