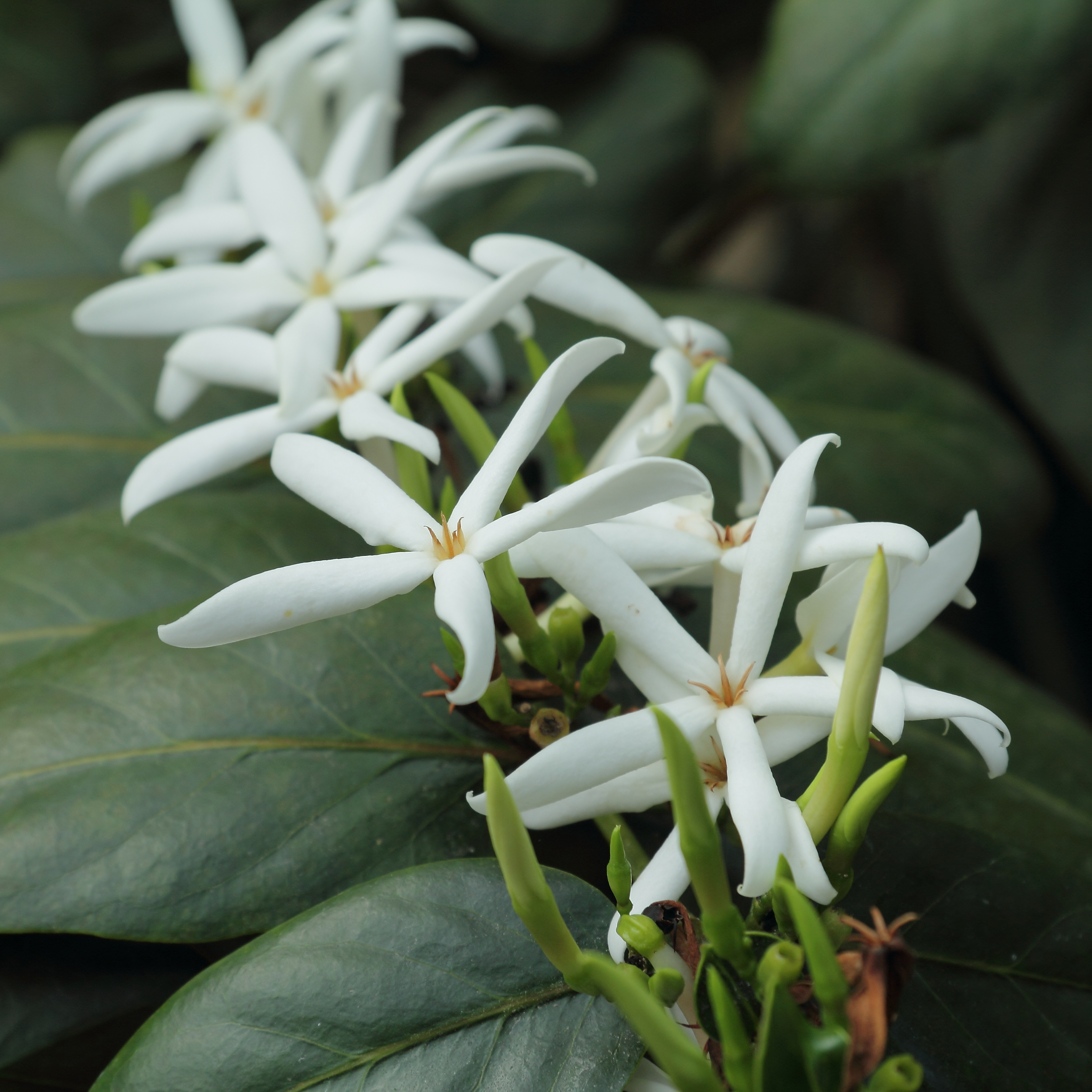
- Ramosmania rodriguesii in cultivation at the Royal Botanic Gardens, Kew

Scientific classification
- Kingdom: Plantae
- Clade: Tracheophytes
- Clade: Angiosperms
- Clade: Eudicots
- Clade: Asterids
- Order: Gentianales
- Family: Rubiaceae
- Tribe: Octotropideae
- Genus: Ramosmania; Tirveng. & Verdc.

Type species
- Ramosmania heterophylla (Balf. f.) Tirveng. & Verdc.

Species
- See text
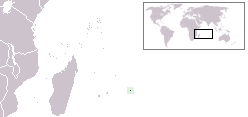
- Ramosmania is endemic to Rodrigues, Mauritius

= Ramosmania =

Genus of plants

Ramosmania is a genus of two species of small trees in the family Rubiaceae; one is extinct. Both species are endemic to the island of Rodrigues, Mauritius.

== Taxonomy ==
It was described by Deva D. Tirvengadum and Bernard Verdcourt in 1982 with Ramosmania heterophylla (Balf. f.) Tirveng. & Verdc. as the type species. Ramosmania was identified as the sister group to the genus Fernelia Comm. ex Lam.

=== Species ===
The genus comprises two species:

- Ramosmania rodriguesii Tirveng.
- †Ramosmania heterophylla (Balf.f.) Tirveng. & Verdc. (extinct)

== Cytology ==
The diploid chromosome count of Ramosmania rodriguesii is 2n = 22.

== Conservation ==
The only remaining species, Ramosmania rodriguesii, was re-discovered by a schoolboy in 1979. After its rediscovery, the local population repeatedly cut off branches of the only remaining tree. To prevent its extinction, cuttings were sent to the Royal Botanic Gardens, Kew. Vegetative propagation was successful, however generative reproduction was not possible, as only functionally male flowers were formed. Later, it was discovered that heat stress could induce the formation of female flowers, which were then successfully pollinated. Cultivated plants have been reintroduced to Rodrigues, but it is still classified as Critically Endangered by the International Union for Conservation of Nature and Natural Resources.
