= Lyon Zoo =

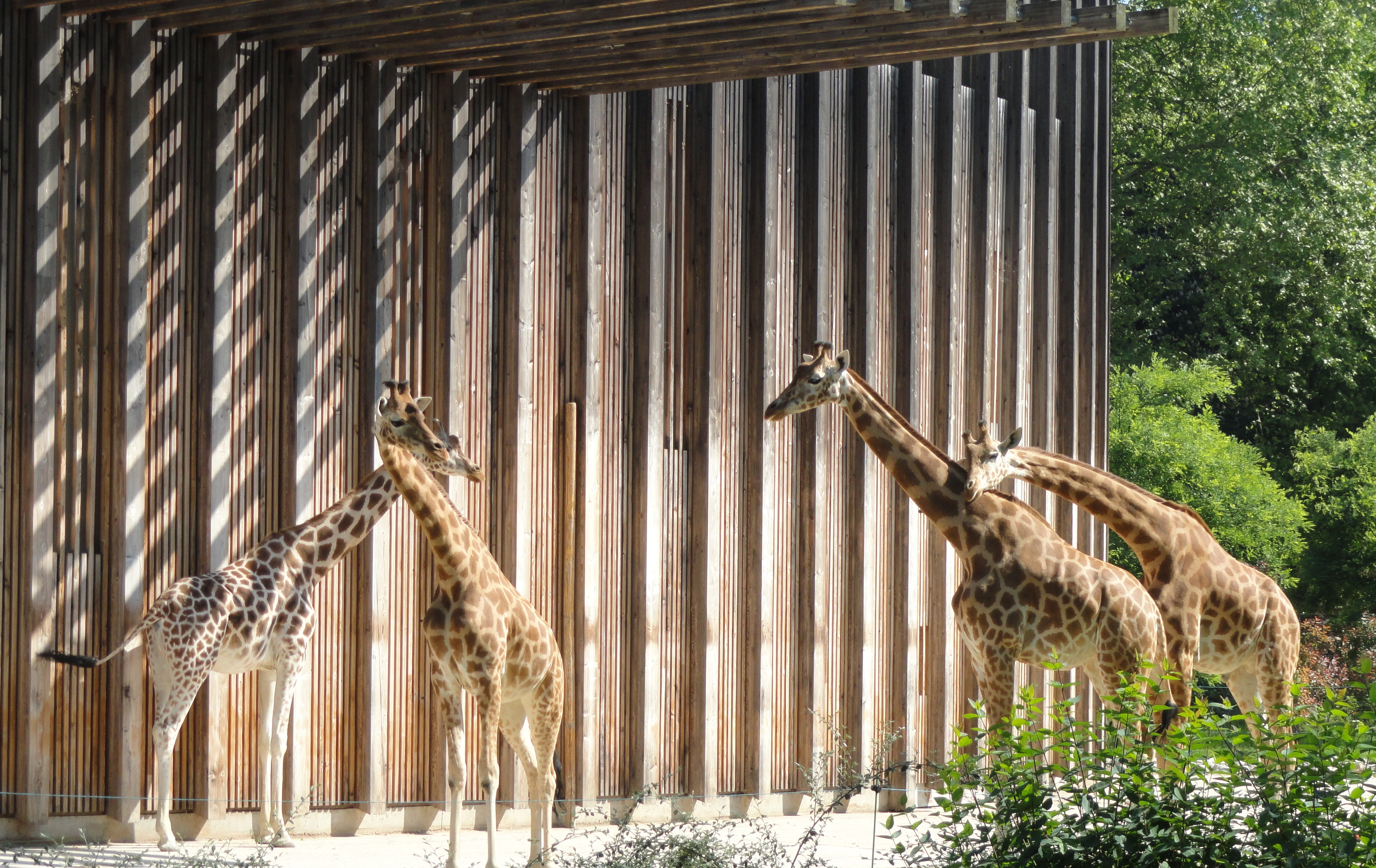
- Interactive map of Lyon Zoo
- 45°46′39″N 4°51′23″E
- Date opened: 1858
- Location: France Lyon, France
- Land area: 9 ha
- No. of animals: 300
- No. of species: 66
- Memberships: EAZA
- Major exhibits: Asian lion, Giraffes, Gibbons, Amur leopard, Desert Crocodile
- Website: http://www.zoo.lyon.fr/zoo/sections/fr

Lyon Zoo (fr. Zoo de Lyon, also known as Jardin zoologique de Lyon, or Zoo du Parc de la Tête d'Or) is a zoo in France located in Auvergne-Rhône-Alpes inside parc de la Tête d'Or in the town of Lyon.

The zoo was founded 1858 by Claude-Marius Vaïsse (8 July 1799 – 8 August 1864), a French lawyer who joined the administration of the July Monarchy.

The zoo presents 300 animals from 66 Species

Lyon Zoo is member of EAZA.

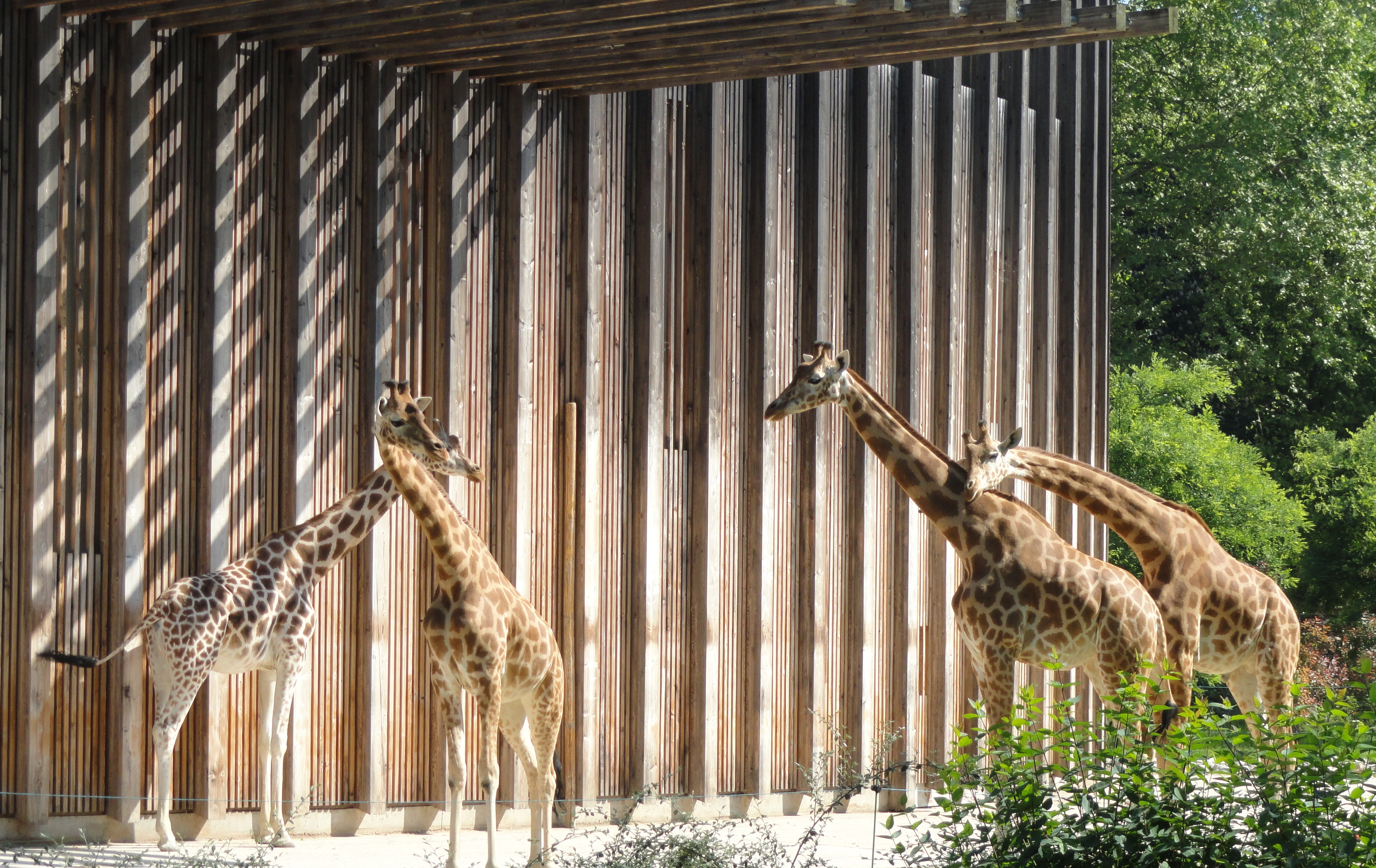

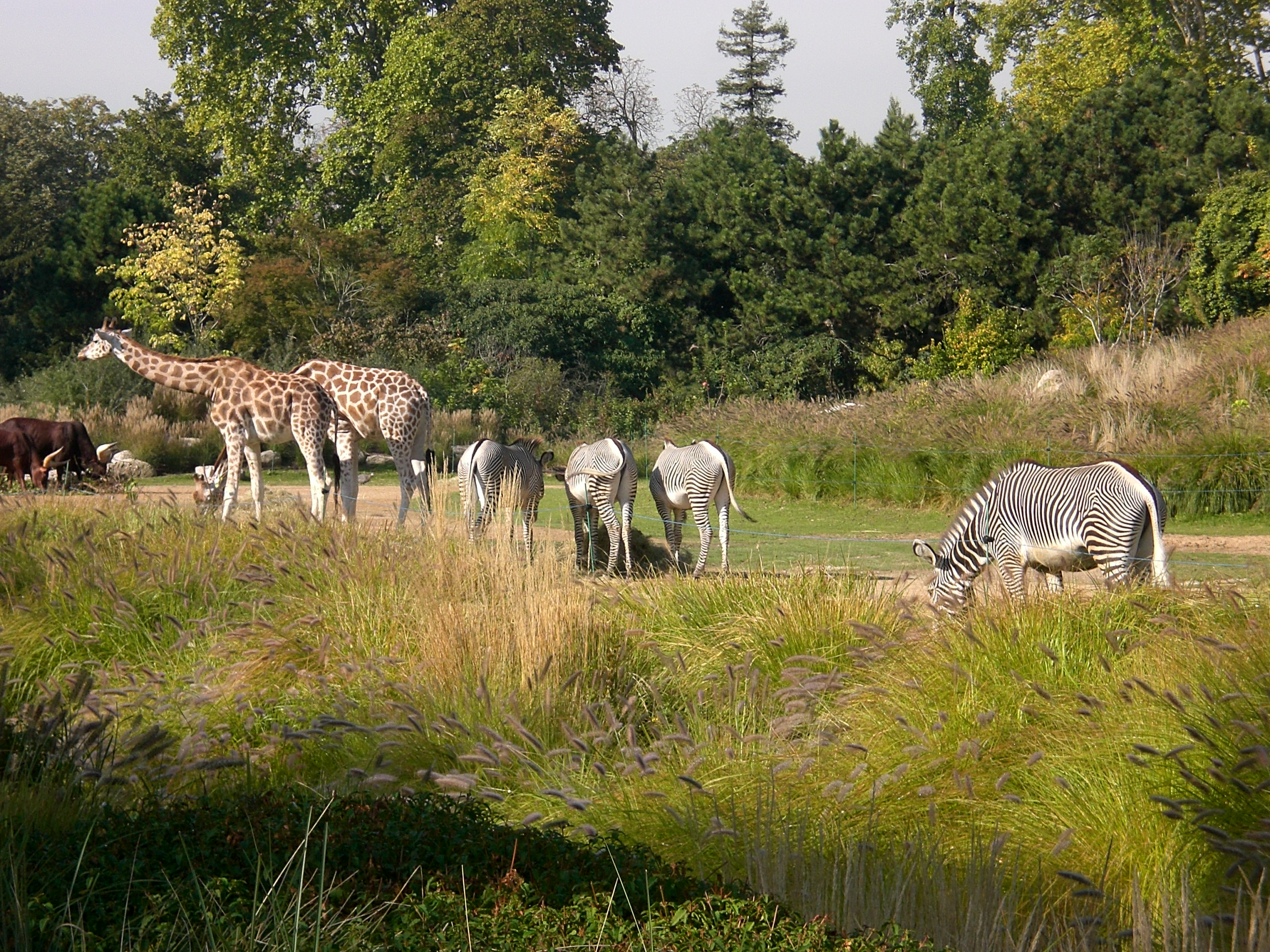

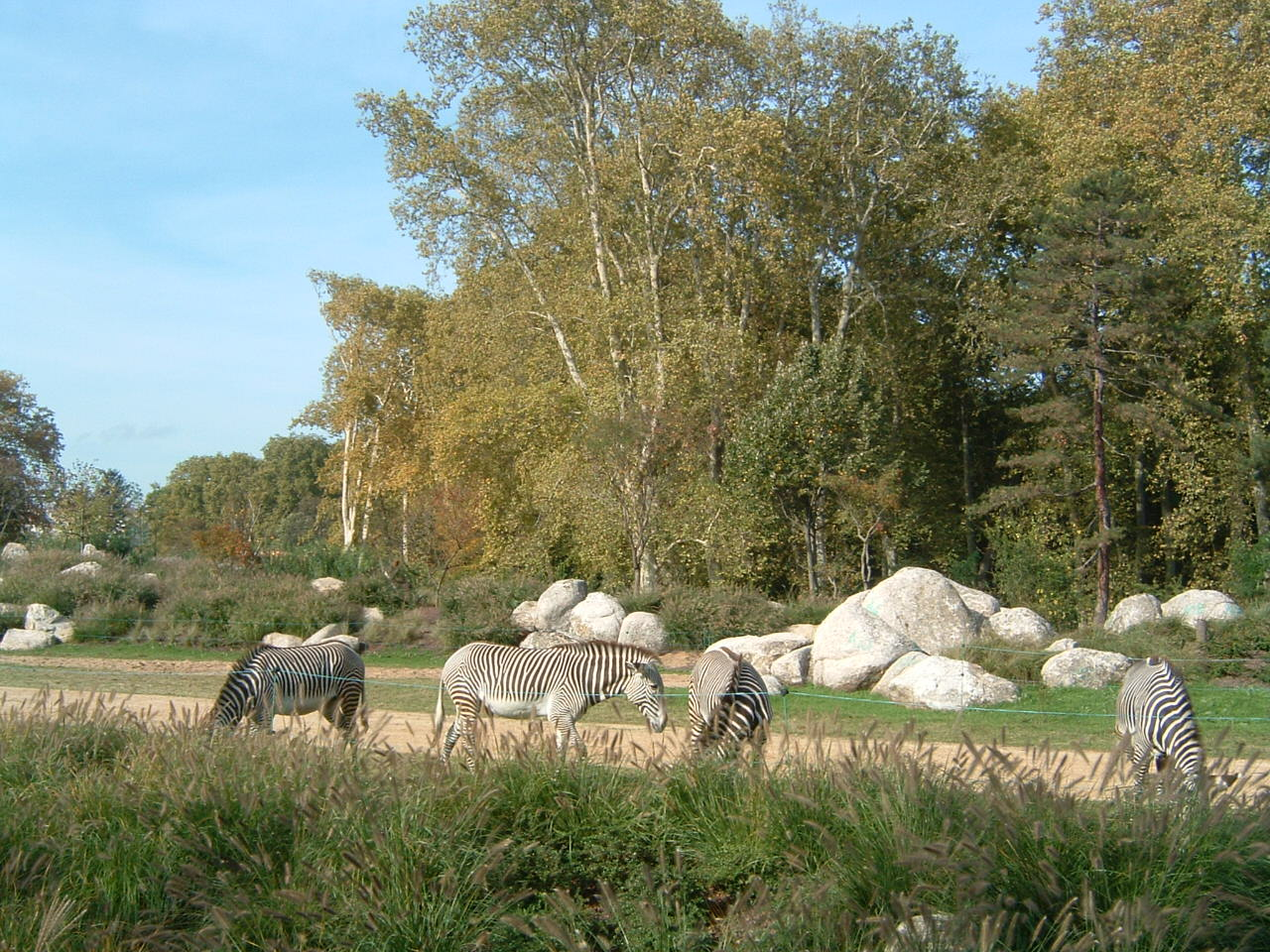

== See also ==
- Parc de la Tête d'Or
