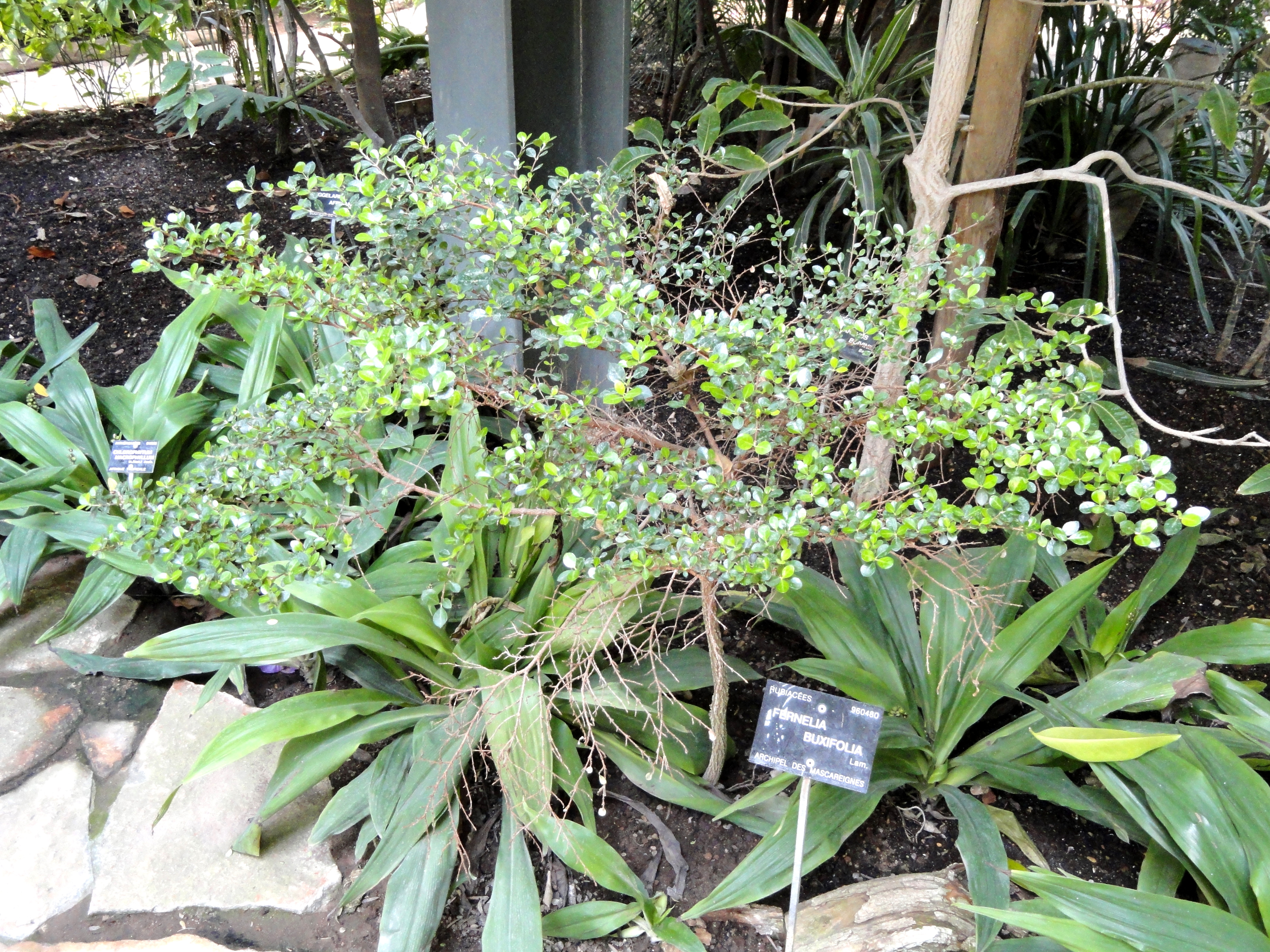
- Fernelia buxifolia

Scientific classification
- Kingdom: Plantae
- Clade: Tracheophytes
- Clade: Angiosperms
- Clade: Eudicots
- Clade: Asterids
- Order: Gentianales
- Family: Rubiaceae
- Subfamily: Ixoroideae
- Tribe: Octotropideae
- Genus: Fernelia; Comm. ex Lam.

Type species
- Fernelia buxifolia Lam.

= Fernelia =

Genus of plants

Fernelia is a genus of flowering plants in the family Rubiaceae. The genus is endemic to the Mascarene Islands.

== Taxonomy ==
It was validly published by Jean-Baptiste Lamarck in 1788 based on previous work by Philibert Commerson. Fernelia was identified as the sister group to the genus Ramosmania Tirveng. & Verdc.

=== Species ===
- Fernelia buxifolia Lam.
- Fernelia decipiens Verdc.
- Fernelia obovata Lam.
- Fernelia pedunculata C.F.Gaertn.
