= Jardin botanique de Lyon =

Botanical garden in Lyon, France

Coordinates: 45.7754°N 4.8564°E

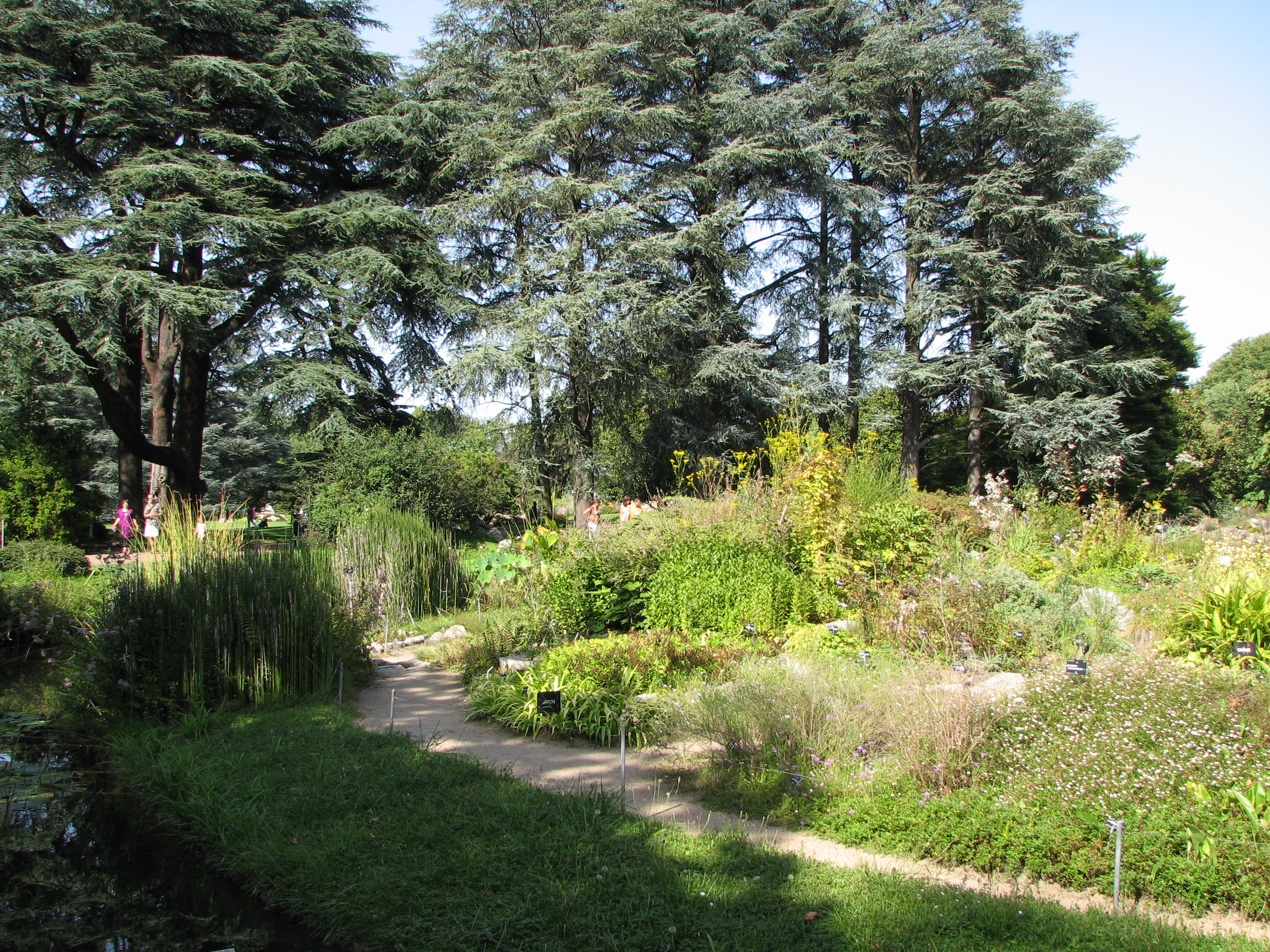
Alpine garden in the Jardin botanique de Lyon

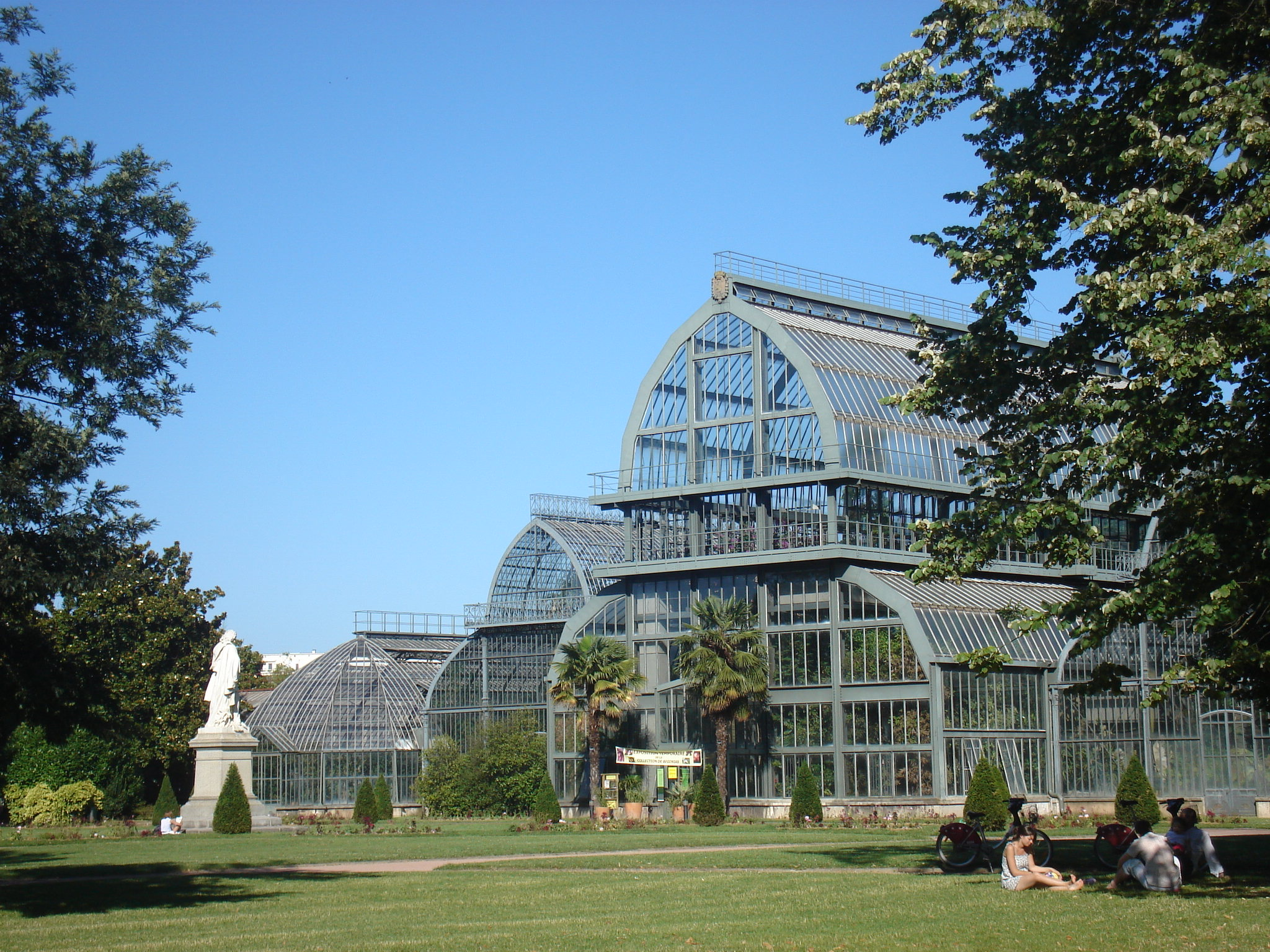
Large greenhouses

The Jardin botanique de Lyon (English: Botanical Garden of Lyon), also known as the Jardin botanique du Parc de la Tête d'Or (Botanical Garden of the Golden Head), is an 8 hectares (20 acres) municipal botanical garden located in the Parc de la Tête d'or in the 6th arrondissement of Lyon, France. It is open weekdays without charge.

== History ==
The garden was established in 1857 as a successor to earlier botanical gardens dating to 1796; it is now described as France's largest municipal botanical garden. It contains about 15,000 plants, including 3,500 plants of temperate regions, 760 species of shrubs, a hundred species of wild roses, 750 varieties of historical roses, 200 varieties of peonies recognised by the Conservatoire Français des Collections Végétales Spécialisées (CCVS), 1,800 species of alpine plants, 50 varieties of water lilies, as well as 6,000 species in its greenhouses.

The garden's greenhouses enclose a total of 6,500 square metres (70,000 sq ft) in area, and include a central pavilion for tropical plants including camellias over a hundred years old; a greenhouse-aquarium with Amazonian water lilies; a Dutch greenhouse containing carnivorous plants; small greenhouses with orchids; and small cold greenhouses with azaleas, cacti and so forth.

== See also ==
- List of botanical gardens in France
