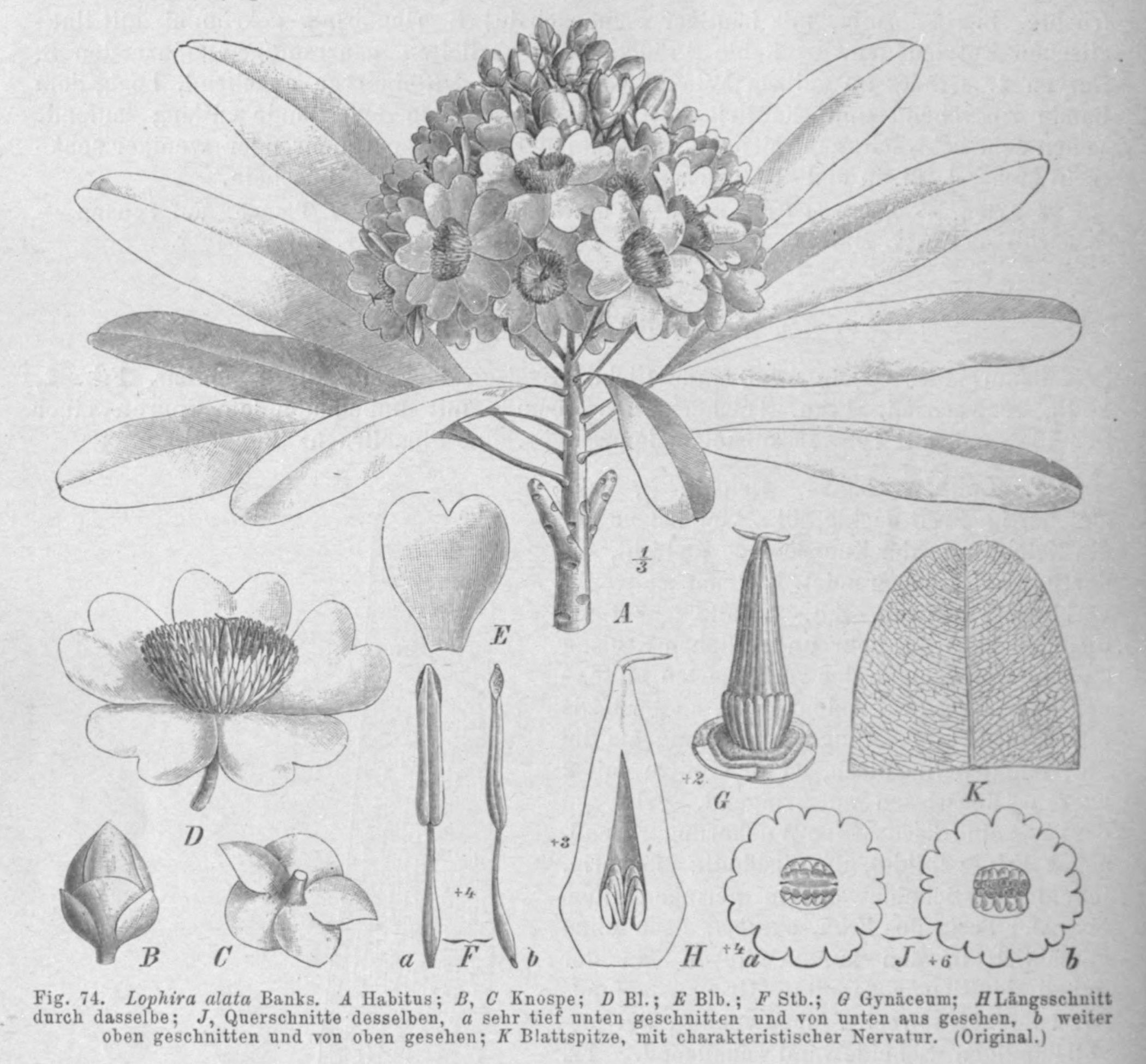

Scientific classification
- Kingdom: Plantae
- Clade: Tracheophytes
- Clade: Angiosperms
- Clade: Eudicots
- Clade: Rosids
- Order: Malpighiales
- Family: Ochnaceae
- Genus: Lophira
- Species: L. lanceolata

Binomial name
- Lophira lanceolata Tiegh. ex Keay

= Lophira lanceolata =

Species of tree

Lophira lanceolata, commonly known as the dwarf red ironwood, is a species of tree in the family Ochnaceae which is native to tropical West and Central Africa. The timber is used for heavy construction, an edible oil can be extracted from the seeds and various parts of the plant are used in traditional medicine.

== Description ==
Lophira lanceolata is a small deciduous tree growing to a height of 16 m (52 ft) or more. The tree has a narrow crown and steeply ascending branches, and forms suckers readily. The trunk is usually unbranched to around 8 m (26 ft) and can reach a diameter of about 70 cm (28 in). The bark is grey and corky, coming away in coarse flakes. The leaves are clustered at the end of the twigs. They are alternate, narrowly oblong, simple and entire, with rounded or notched apexes. The new foliage is pink or red at first. The inflorescence take the form of a loose panicle at the end of the shoot. The individual flowers are bisexual, scented and white, with parts in fives. This is followed by a partially woody, conical achene surrounded by a winged calyx, containing a single, large seed. The tree is very similar to the closely related Lophira alata but is smaller, has narrower leaves with longer stalks, and larger seeds.

== Distribution and habitat ==
Lophira lanceolata is found in tropical West and Central Africa, its range extending from Senegal to Sudan, Uganda and the Democratic Republic of the Congo. It grows at altitudes of up to around 1,500 m (5,000 ft) on wooded savanna, particularly on the edges of larger forested areas where it may grow thickly. Established trees are tolerant of wildfires but saplings are likely to be damaged.

== Uses ==
The timber of this tree is dense and is used in bridge building and other heavy construction work, and for tool-making. It burns well as firewood and can be used to make charcoal. The fragrant flowers are attractive to honey bees. The seeds can be eaten, but are mainly used for extraction of a vegetable oil called "meni oil" which is used in the manufacture of foodstuffs, soap and cosmetics. The foliage is used as fodder for livestock and in Cameroon, edible caterpillars are cultivated on the leaves. The seed oil, leaves, sap, bark and roots have multiple uses in traditional medicine.
