= Rhabdophyllum =

- Rhabdophyllum affine Tiegh

Scientific classification
- Kingdom: Plantae
- Clade: Embryophytes
- Clade: Tracheophytes
- Clade: Spermatophytes
- Clade: Angiosperms
- Clade: Eudicots
- Clade: Rosids
- Order: Malpighiales
- Family: Ochnaceae
- Subfamily: Ochnoideae
- Tribe: Ochneae
- Subtribe: Ochninae
- Genus: Rhabdophyllum; Tiegh.

Species
- See text

Genus of flowering plants

Rhabdophyllum is a genus of flowering plants in the family Ochnaceae, native to western and central Tropical Africa. Nuclear DNA evidence shows that it is sister to Campylospermum.

== Species ==
The following species are accepted:

- Rhabdophyllum affine (Hook.f.) Tiegh.
- Rhabdophyllum arnoldianum (De Wild. & T.Durand) Tiegh.
- Rhabdophyllum calophyllum (Hook.f.) Tiegh.
- Rhabdophyllum crassipedicellatum Sosef
- Rhabdophyllum letestui Farron
- Rhabdophyllum rigidum Farron
- Rhabdophyllum thonneri (De Wild.) Farron
- Rhabdophyllum welwitschii Tiegh.
