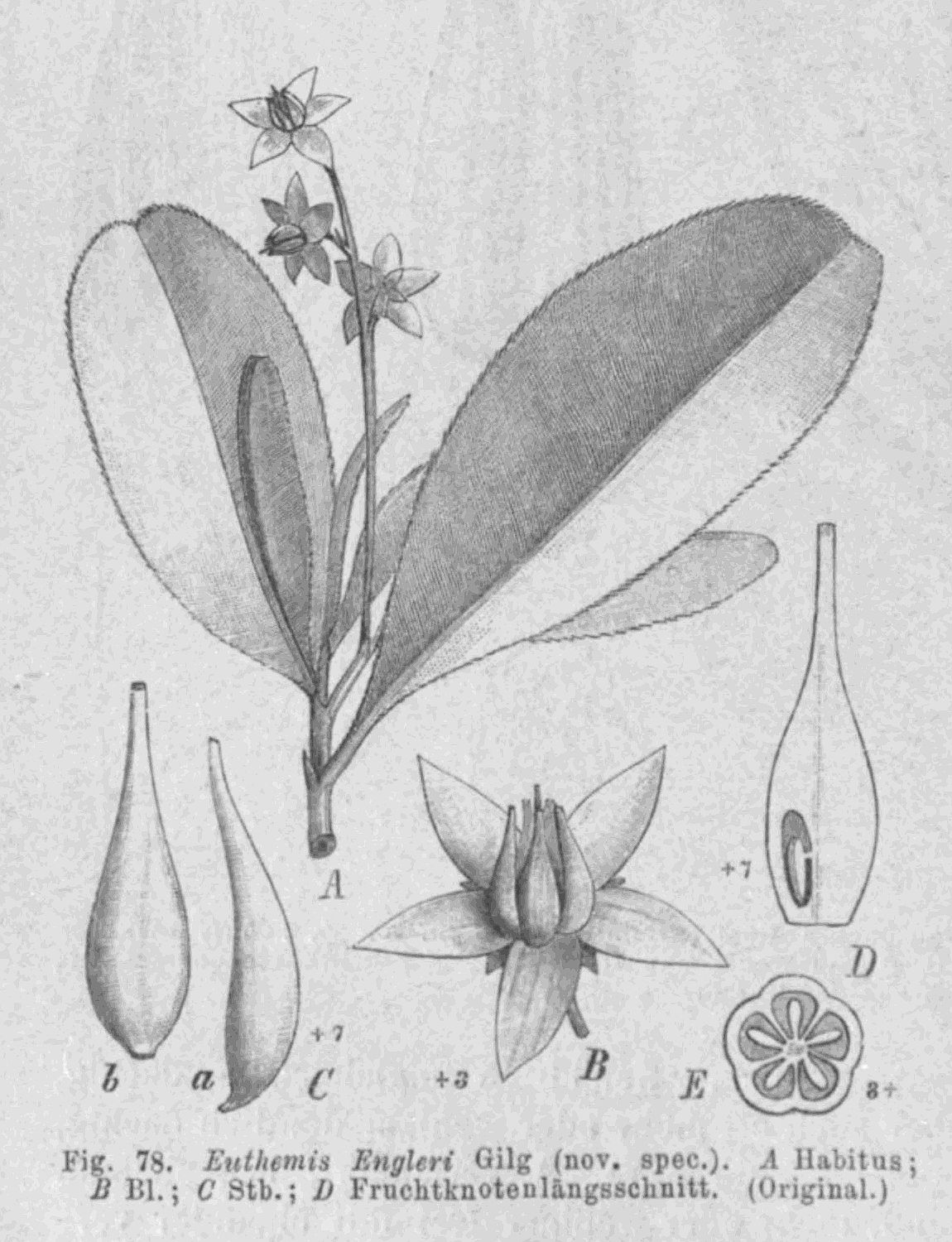
- In Natürl. Pflanzenfam, 1893

Conservation status
- Least Concern (IUCN 3.1)

Scientific classification
- Kingdom: Plantae
- Clade: Tracheophytes
- Clade: Angiosperms
- Clade: Eudicots
- Clade: Rosids
- Order: Malpighiales
- Family: Ochnaceae
- Genus: Euthemis
- Species: E. minor

Binomial name
- Euthemis minor Jack

Synonyms
- Euthemis ciliata H.Pearson; Euthemis engleri Gilg; Euthemis hackenbergii Diels; Euthemis obtusifolia Hook.f.

= Euthemis minor =

Species of flowering plant

Euthemis minor is a plant in the family Ochnaceae. The specific epithet minor is from the Latin meaning "small", referring to the species' smaller size when compared with E. leucocarpa.

== Description ==
Euthemis minor grows as a shrub or treelet measuring up to 5 metres (20 ft) tall. The flowers are pinkish when fresh. The roundish fruits measure up to 0.6 cm (0.2 in) in diameter.

== Distribution and habitat ==
Euthemis minor grows naturally in Sumatra, Peninsular Malaysia and Borneo. Its habitat is lowland to submontane forests, including kerangas forests, from sea-level to 1,250 metres (4,000 ft) elevation.
