= Krukoviella =

Scientific classification
- Kingdom: Plantae
- Clade: Tracheophytes
- Clade: Angiosperms
- Clade: Eudicots
- Clade: Rosids
- Order: Malpighiales
- Family: Ochnaceae
- Subfamily: Ochnoideae
- Tribe: Sauvagesieae
- Genus: Krukoviella; A.C.Sm.
- Species: K. disticha

Binomial name
- Krukoviella disticha (Tiegh.) Dwyer

Synonyms
- Godoya disticha (Tiegh.) Ule; Godoya ulei Gilg ex Ule; Krukoviella scandens A.C.Sm.; Planchonella disticha Tiegh.

Genus of plants

Krukoviella is a monotypic genus of flowering plants belonging to the family Ochnaceae. It has one synonym Planchonella Tiegh. The only species is Krukoviella disticha (Tiegh.) Dwyer

Its native range is Peru and northern Brazil.

The genus name of Krukoviella is in honour of Boris Alexander Krukoff (1898–1983), a Russian-born American botanist who collected in South America, West Africa and Sumatra. He was later a curator at the herbarium of the New York Botanical Garden. The Latin specific epithet of disticha refers to distichus a Greek word meaning alternately opposed or in two ranks. The genus was first published in J. Arnold Arbor. Vol.20 on page 295 in 1939, and the species was first published in Torreya Vol.45 on page 71 in 1945.
