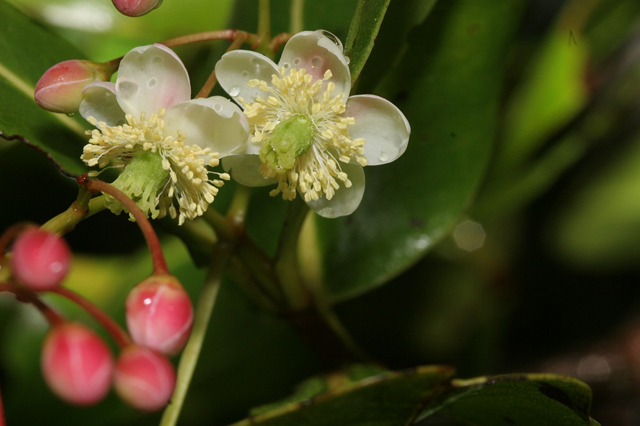

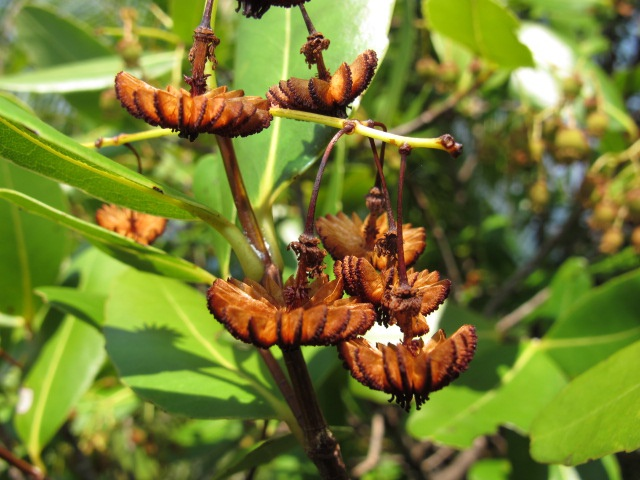
- Flower buds, open flowers and the medusa-like dehisced fruit (below)

Conservation status
- Critically Endangered (IUCN 3.1)

Scientific classification
- Kingdom: Plantae
- Clade: Embryophytes
- Clade: Tracheophytes
- Clade: Spermatophytes
- Clade: Angiosperms
- Clade: Eudicots
- Clade: Rosids
- Order: Malpighiales
- Family: Ochnaceae
- Subfamily: Medusagynoideae; Reveal
- Genus: Medusagyne; Baker
- Species: M. oppositifolia

Binomial name
- Medusagyne oppositifolia Baker

= Medusagyne =

Jellyfish tree

Genus of trees

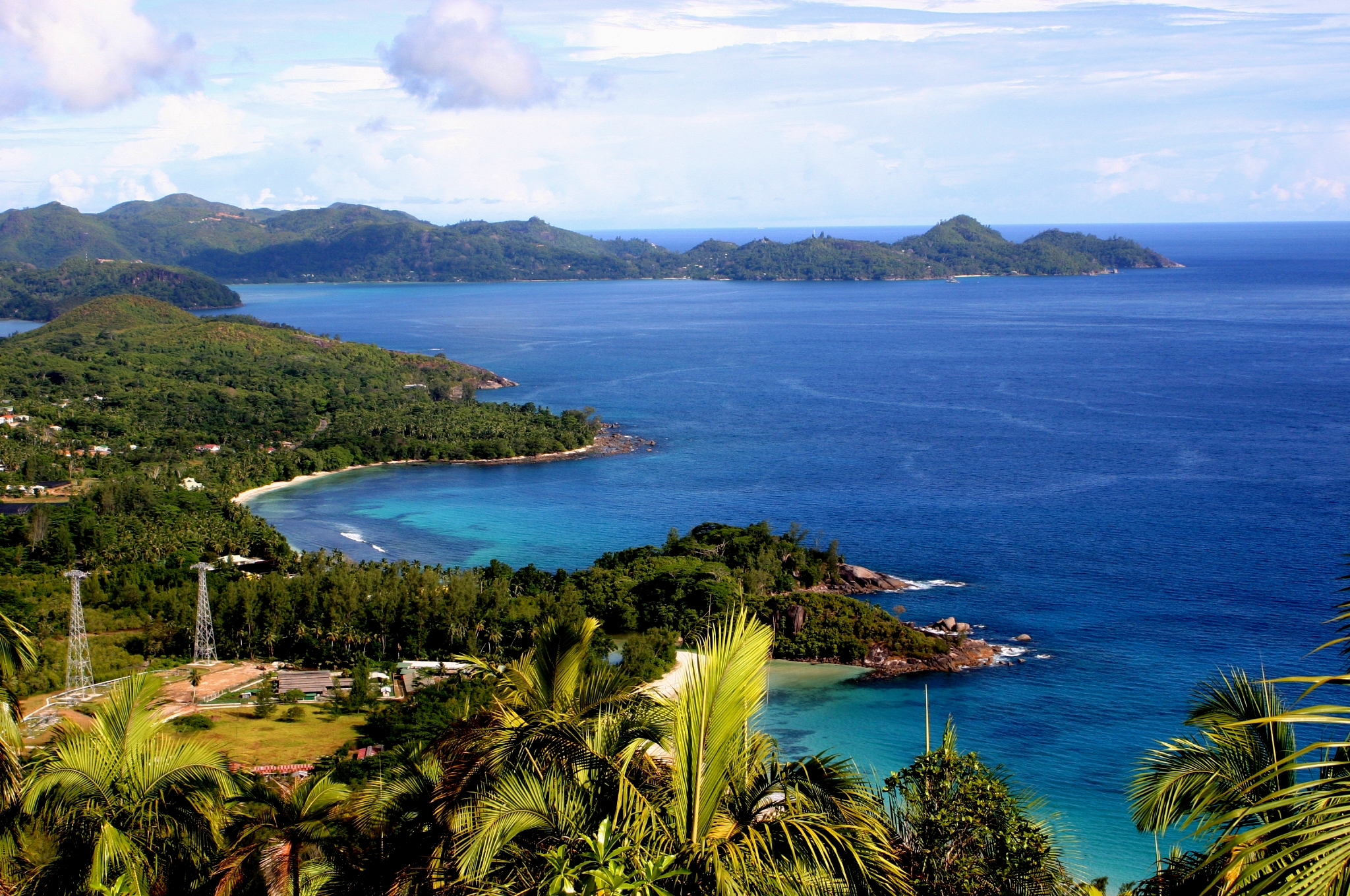
Mahé, home of jellyfish trees

Medusagyne oppositifolia, the jellyfish tree, is a species of tree endemic to the island of Mahé, of the Seychelles. It is the only member of the genus Medusagyne of the tropical tree and shrub family Ochnaceae. The plant, thought to be extinct until a few individuals were found in the 1970s, gets its common name from the distinctive jellyfish-like shape of its dehisced fruit.

== Description ==
They are small trees which can reach up to 15 m (49 ft) tall and have a dense rounded crown of foliage. The bark is dark and has many distinctive, deep fissures. The leaves are shiny and leathery in appearance with a slightly scalloped edge; they turn bright red with age. Leaves are up to 8 cm (3.1 in) in length. The small white flowers are difficult to see amongst the dense foliage; male and bisexual flowers are carried on the drooping inflorescence. The generic name Medusagyne was given to the plant by John Gilbert Baker who thought that the gynoecium of the flower resembles the head of Medusa from Greek mythology. Baker did not have the dehisced fruit, which resembles a larval hydrozoan or jellyfish, so he did not base the generic name on this resemblance; this dehiscing fruit consists of a single whorl of up to 25 carpels. The vernacular name, jellyfish tree, was applied later possibly based on the appearance of the dehisced fruit and the coincidence that the word medusa is also used to describe the free-floating umbrella-shaped form of jellyfish. This plant exhibits many adaptations to dry climate, strange on a moist archipelago. It can withstand drought, and its seeds disperse by the wind. This suggests it has Gondwanan origins. The fruit is green and rounded; the outer coat becomes reddish-brown with maturity and then dries, exposing the seeds within, which are then distributed by the wind.

== Classification ==
The genus Medusagyne is in the family Ochnaceae, e.g. in the Angiosperm Phylogeny Group classification, though it is sometimes in the monogeneric family Medusagynaceae. The small tropical American family Quiinaceae is also included in this broad concept of Ochnaceae.

== Habitat ==
The tree inhabits exposed granite slopes, at present all locations are within 2 km (1.2 mi) of the sea.

== Threats ==
The jellyfish tree presents a conundrum in that the seeds seem unable to germinate in the wild; no young plants have been observed in the natural stands. Successful cultivation in botanic gardens has occurred in very humid conditions, but high humidity is unlikely in the exposed habitat where these trees are found in the wild. It has been suggested that jellyfish trees have been lost from the more appropriate habitat of moist forests through competition with other species and climate change. They are also prone to wildfires, invasive species, and not having enough space to grow.

== Conservation ==
Four populations of jellyfish tree are known, at Bernica, Mont Sebert, Mont Copolia and Mont Jasmin on Mahé. Three of the existing populations (Bernica, Mont Copolia and Mont Jasmin) are protected within the Morne Seychellois National Park. Although seedlings have been grown in a number of botanic gardens, many problems remain and a conservation priority must be further researched into the reproductive biology of this intriguing species before any effective Action Plan for its future can be devised.
