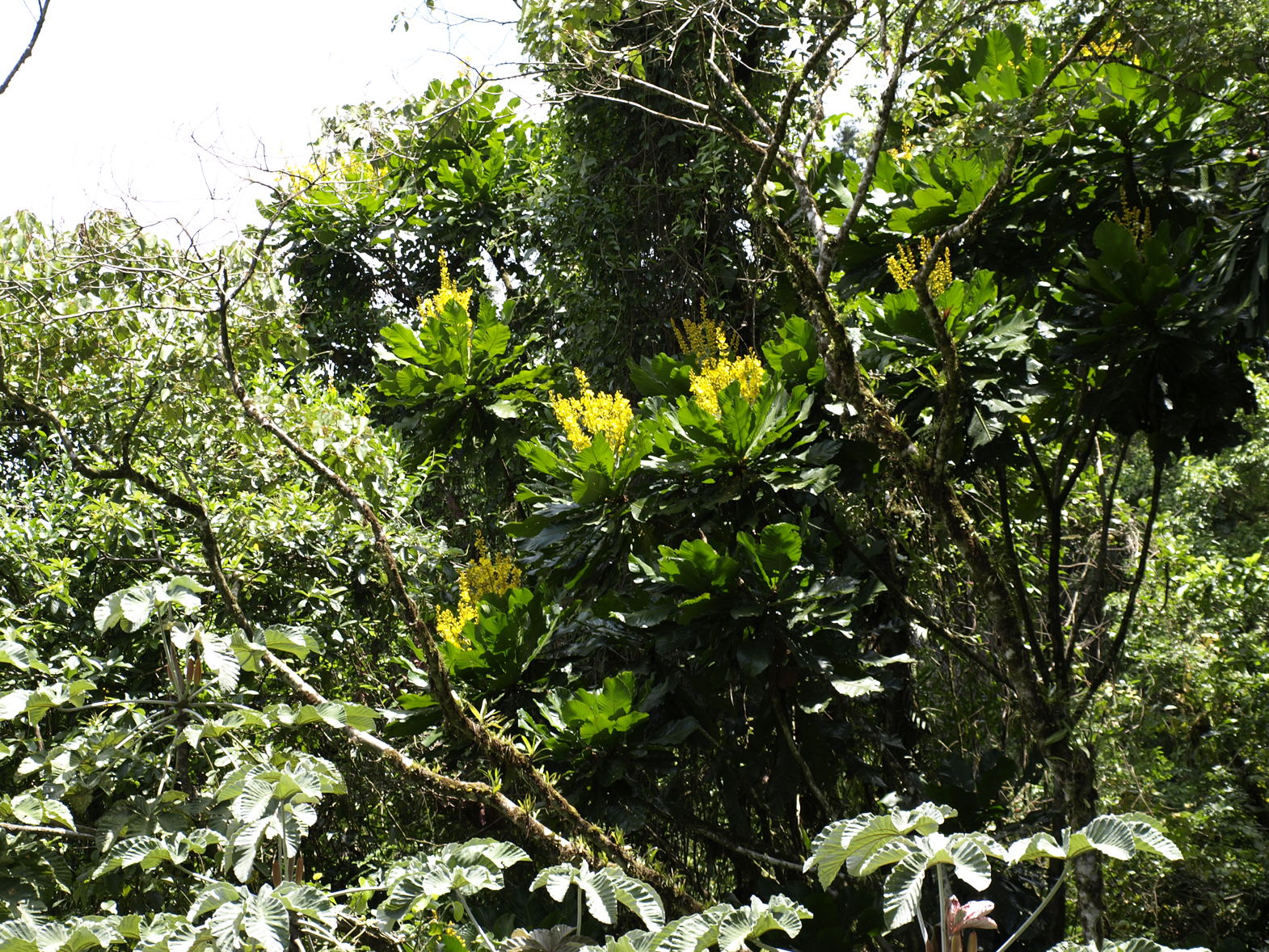

Conservation status
- Least Concern (IUCN 3.1)

Scientific classification
- Kingdom: Plantae
- Clade: Tracheophytes
- Clade: Angiosperms
- Clade: Eudicots
- Clade: Rosids
- Order: Malpighiales
- Family: Ochnaceae
- Subfamily: Ochnoideae
- Tribe: Sauvagesieae
- Genus: Cespedesia; Goudot
- Species: C. spathulata

Binomial name
- Cespedesia spathulata (Ruiz & Pav.) Planch.

Synonyms
- Godoya spathulata Ruiz & Pav.; Cespedesia amazonica Huber; Cespedesia bonplandii Goudot; Cespedesia brasiliana Tiegh.; Cespedesia discolor W.Bull; Cespedesia excelsa Rusby; Cespedesia macrophylla Seem.; Cespedesia repanda (Bonpl. ex Kunth) Tiegh.; Cespedesia repanda var. lanceolata Cuatrec.; Cespedesia scandens (Tiegh.) Dwyer; Cespedesia sprucei Tiegh.; Fournieria scandens Tiegh.; Godoya repanda Bonpl. ex Kunth; Godoya scandens (Tiegh.) E.Fourn. ex Prain

= Cespedesia =

Genus of flowering plants

Cespedesia is a genus of flowering plants belonging to the family Ochnaceae. It contains a single species, Cespedesia spathulata. The common name is Membrillo de Montana. At the top of the trunk and any vertical reiterations is a rosette of 1 m (3 ft 3 in) long spatulate leaves which are held in a near-vertical posture.

Its native range is Central and Southern Tropical America.
