= Godoya antioquiensis =

Scientific classification
- Kingdom: Plantae
- Clade: Tracheophytes
- Clade: Angiosperms
- Clade: Eudicots
- Clade: Rosids
- Order: Malpighiales
- Family: Ochnaceae
- Genus: Godoya
- Species: G. antioquiensis

Binomial name
- Godoya antioquiensis Planch.

Species of tree

Godoya antioquiensis is a species of tree in the family Ochnaceae. It is native to South America.
