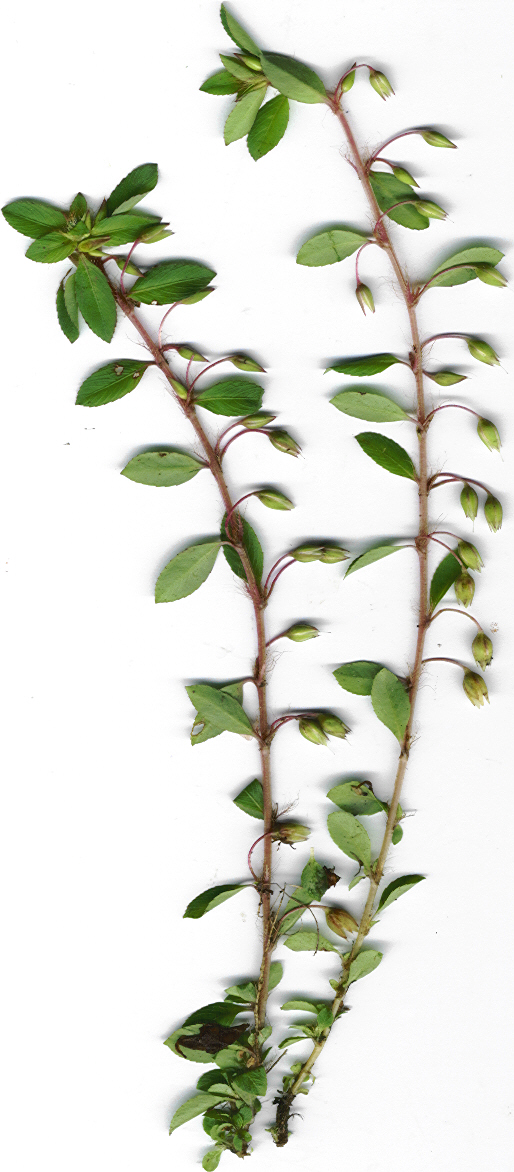
- Sauvagesia erecta

Scientific classification
- Kingdom: Plantae
- Clade: Tracheophytes
- Clade: Angiosperms
- Clade: Eudicots
- Clade: Rosids
- Order: Malpighiales
- Family: Ochnaceae
- Subfamily: Ochnoideae
- Tribe: Sauvagesieae
- Genus: Sauvagesia; L. (1753)

Species
- 49; see text

Synonyms
- Iron P.Browne (1756); Lauradia Vand. (1788); Leitgebia Eichler (1871); Pentaspatella Gleason (1931); Roraimanthus Gleason (1933); Sauvagea L. (1758), orth. var.; Vausagesia Baill. (1890); Sauvagia St.-Lag. (1881), orth. var.

= Sauvagesia =

Genus of flowering plants

Sauvagesia is a genus of flowering plants in the family Ochnaceae. It includes 49 species native to the tropical Americas, tropical Africa, and Madagascar.

== Species ==
The species in the genus are:

- Sauvagesia africana (Baill.) Bamps
- Sauvagesia aliciae Sastre
- Sauvagesia alpestris (Mart.) Zappi & E.Lucas
- Sauvagesia amoena Ule
- Sauvagesia angustifolia Ule
- Sauvagesia brevipetala Gilli
- Sauvagesia bryoclada Queiroz-Lima & D.B.O.S.Cardoso
- Sauvagesia capillaris (A.St.-Hil.) Sastre
- Sauvagesia cryptothallis S.Nozawa
- Sauvagesia deficiens A.C.Sm.
- Sauvagesia deflexifolia Gardner
- Sauvagesia elata Benth.
- Sauvagesia elegantissima A.St.-Hil.
- Sauvagesia erecta L.
- Sauvagesia ericoides (A.St.-Hil.) Sastre
- Sauvagesia erioclada Maguire & K.D.Phelps
- Sauvagesia falcisepala Sastre
- Sauvagesia fruticosa Mart.
- Sauvagesia glandulosa (A.St.-Hil.) Sastre
- Sauvagesia guianensis (Eichler) Sastre
- Sauvagesia imthurniana (Oliv.) Dwyer
- Sauvagesia insignis (Ule) Sastre
- Sauvagesia insolita Queiroz-Lima & D.B.O.S.Cardoso
- Sauvagesia laciniata Sastre
- Sauvagesia lagevianae D.B.O.S.Cardoso
- Sauvagesia lanceolata Sastre
- Sauvagesia linearifolia A.St.-Hil.
- Sauvagesia longifolia Eichler
- Sauvagesia longipes Steyerm.
- Sauvagesia nitida Zappi & E.Lucas
- Sauvagesia nudicaulis Maguire & Wurdack
- Sauvagesia oliveirae Harley & Giul.
- Sauvagesia paganuccii D.B.O.S.Cardoso & Harley
- Sauvagesia paniculata D.B.O.S.Cardoso & A.A.Conc.
- Sauvagesia paucielata Sastre
- Sauvagesia pulchella Planch.
- Sauvagesia racemosa A.St.-Hil.
- Sauvagesia ramosa (Gleason) Sastre
- Sauvagesia ramosissima Spruce ex Eichler
- Sauvagesia ribeiroi Harley & Giul.
- Sauvagesia roraimensis Ule
- Sauvagesia rubiginosa A.St.-Hil.
- Sauvagesia semicylindrifolia Sastre
- Sauvagesia setulosa Queiroz-Lima & D.B.O.S.Cardoso
- Sauvagesia spicata (Glaz. ex Dwyer) Queiroz-Lima & D.B.O.S.Cardoso
- Sauvagesia sprengelii A.St.-Hil.
- Sauvagesia tafelbergensis Sastre
- Sauvagesia tenella Lam.
- Sauvagesia vellozoi (Vell. ex A.St.-Hil.) Sastre

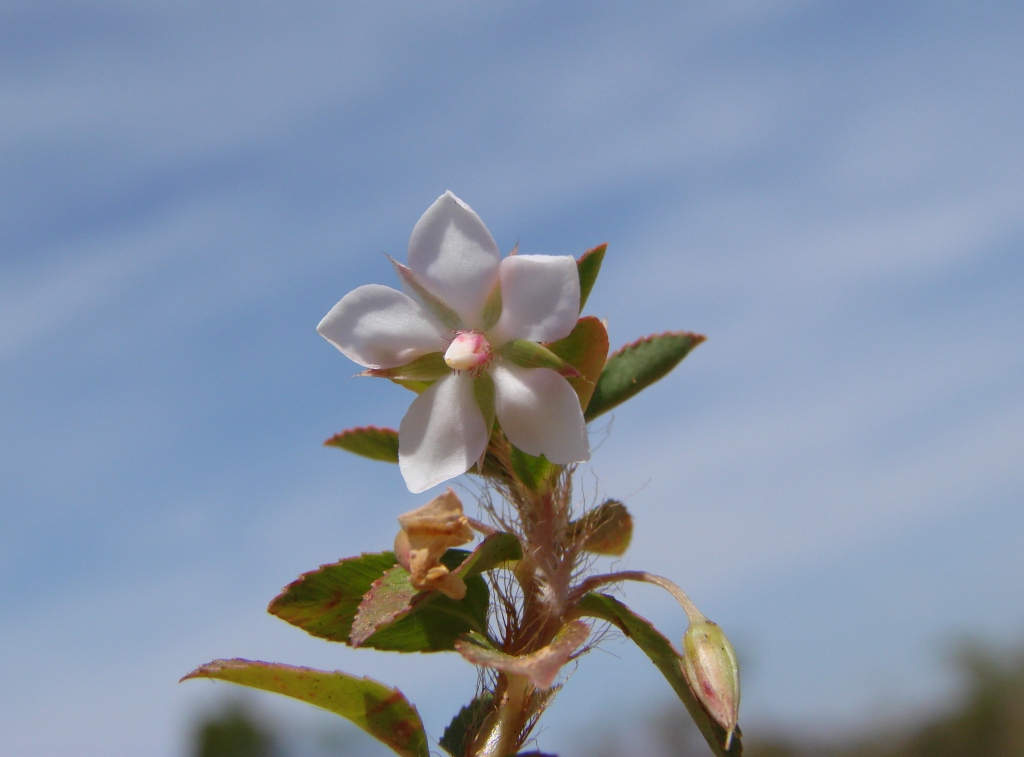
Flower of Sauvagesia erecta
