= Campylospermum amplectens =

Conservation status
- Vulnerable (IUCN 2.3)

Scientific classification
- Kingdom: Plantae
- Clade: Tracheophytes
- Clade: Angiosperms
- Clade: Eudicots
- Clade: Rosids
- Order: Malpighiales
- Family: Ochnaceae
- Genus: Campylospermum
- Species: C. amplectens

Binomial name
- Campylospermum amplectens (Stapf) Farron

Synonyms
- Gomphia amplectens Stapf; Ouratea amplectens (Stapf) Engl.

Species of flowering plant

Campylospermum amplectens, synonym Ouratea amplectens, is a species of plant in the family Ochnaceae. It is found in west tropical Africa: Ghana, Ivory Coast, Liberia and Sierra Leone. It is threatened by habitat loss.
