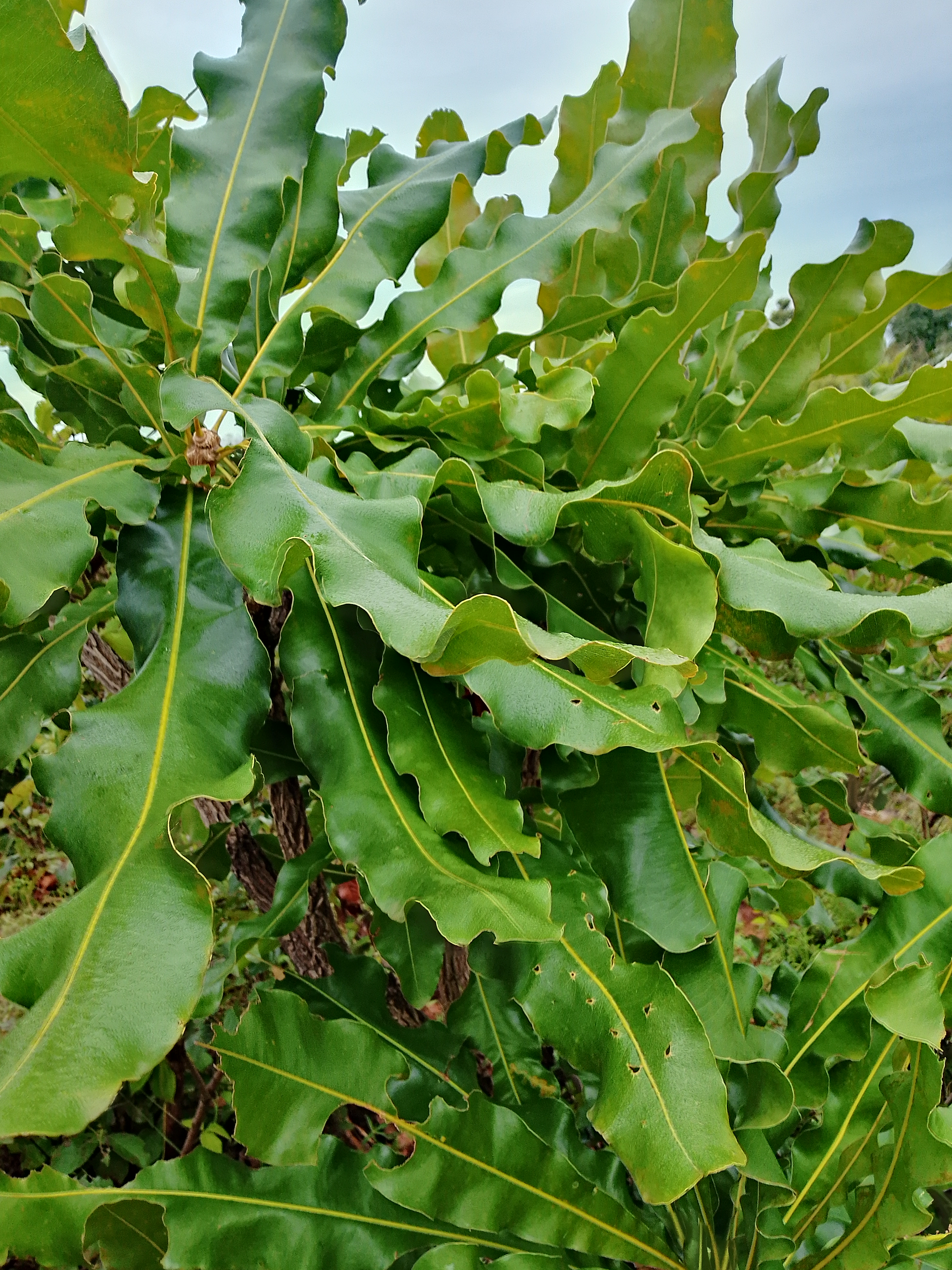
- Lophira lanceolata

Scientific classification
- Kingdom: Plantae
- Clade: Tracheophytes
- Clade: Angiosperms
- Clade: Eudicots
- Clade: Rosids
- Order: Malpighiales
- Family: Ochnaceae
- Subfamily: Ochnoideae
- Tribe: Ochneae
- Subtribe: Lophirinae; J.V.Schneid.
- Genus: Lophira; Banks ex C.F.Gaertn.

= Lophira =

Genus of flowering plants

Lophira is a genus of plants in the family Ochnaceae. Almost every part of Lophira (bark, root bark, leaves, and leafy shoots) is used for various medicinal purposes.

Species include:

- Lophira alata Banks ex C.F.Gaertn.
- Lophira lanceolata Tiegh. ex Keay. L. lanceolata is also known as false shea or meni oil tree.
