= Campylospermum scheffleri =

Conservation status
- Vulnerable (IUCN 2.3)

Scientific classification
- Kingdom: Plantae
- Clade: Tracheophytes
- Clade: Angiosperms
- Clade: Eudicots
- Clade: Rosids
- Order: Malpighiales
- Family: Ochnaceae
- Genus: Campylospermum
- Species: C. scheffleri

Binomial name
- Campylospermum scheffleri (Engl. & Gilg) Farron

Synonyms
- Exomicrum scheffleri (Engl. & Gilg) Tiegh.; Gomphia scheffleri (Engl. & Gilg) Verdc.; Ouratea scheffleri Engl. & Gilg; Ouratea schusteri Gilg

Species of flowering plant

Campylospermum scheffleri is a species of plant in the family Ochnaceae. It is native from south-east Kenya to Tanzania.
