= Godoya =

Scientific classification
- Kingdom: Plantae
- Clade: Tracheophytes
- Clade: Angiosperms
- Clade: Eudicots
- Clade: Rosids
- Order: Malpighiales
- Family: Ochnaceae
- Subfamily: Ochnoideae
- Tribe: Sauvagesieae
- Genus: Godoya; Ruiz & Pav. (1794)

Species
- Godoya antioquiensis Planch.; Godoya obovata Ruiz & Pav.

Genus of flowering plants

Godoya is a genus of trees in the family Ochnaceae. It is native to South America.

== Taxonomy ==
Godoya contains 2 recognized species:

- Godoya antioquiensis Planch.
- Godoya obovata Ruiz & Pav.
