= Indosinia =

Scientific classification
- Kingdom: Plantae
- Clade: Tracheophytes
- Clade: Angiosperms
- Clade: Eudicots
- Clade: Rosids
- Order: Malpighiales
- Family: Ochnaceae
- Subfamily: Ochnoideae
- Tribe: Sauvagesieae
- Genus: Indosinia; J.E.Vidal
- Species: I. involucrata

Binomial name
- Indosinia involucrata (Gagnep.) J.E.Vidal (1965)

Synonyms
- Distephania Gagnep. (1948), non Distephana.; Distephania involucrata Gagnep. (1948)

Genus of plants

Indosinia is a genus of flowering plants belonging to the family Ochnaceae. It contains a single species, Indosinia involucrata.

Its native range is Vietnam.
