= Tyleria =

Scientific classification
- Kingdom: Plantae
- Clade: Tracheophytes
- Clade: Angiosperms
- Clade: Eudicots
- Clade: Rosids
- Order: Malpighiales
- Family: Ochnaceae
- Subfamily: Ochnoideae
- Tribe: Sauvagesieae
- Genus: Tyleria; Gleason

Synonyms
- Adenanthe Maguire, Steyerm. & Wurdack

Genus of flowering plants

Tyleria is a genus of flowering plants belonging to the family Ochnaceae. It is also within the Sauvagesieae tribe.

It is native to Brazil, Guyana and Venezuela.

== Known species ==
As accepted by Kew:

- Tyleria apiculata Sastre
- Tyleria aristata Maguire & Wurdack
- Tyleria bicarpellata (Maguire, Steyerm. & Wurdack) M.C.E.Amaral
- Tyleria breweriana Steyerm.
- Tyleria floribunda Gleason
- Tyleria grandiflora Gleason
- Tyleria linearis Gleason
- Tyleria pendula Maguire & Wurdack
- Tyleria phelpsiana Maguire & Steyerm.
- Tyleria silvana Maguire
- Tyleria spathulata Gleason
- Tyleria spectabilis Maguire & Wurdack
- Tyleria terrae-humilis Sastre
- Tyleria tremuloidea Maguire & Wurdack

The genus name of Tyleria is in honour of Sidney Frederick Tyler (1907–1993), American banker and cattle rancher; supporter of charitable organizations. It was first described and published in Bull. Torrey Bot. Club Vol.58 on page 391 in 1931.
