= Schuurmansiella =

Conservation status
- Near Threatened (IUCN 3.1)

Scientific classification
- Kingdom: Plantae
- Clade: Tracheophytes
- Clade: Angiosperms
- Clade: Eudicots
- Clade: Rosids
- Order: Malpighiales
- Family: Ochnaceae
- Subfamily: Ochnoideae
- Tribe: Sauvagesieae
- Genus: Schuurmansiella; Hallier f.
- Species: S. angustifolia

Binomial name
- Schuurmansiella angustifolia (Hook.f.) Hallier f.

Synonyms
- Schuurmansia angustifolia Hook.f.

Genus of plants

Schuurmansiella is a monotypic genus of plant in the family Ochnaceae. As of July 2024, Plants of the World Online recognises the single species Schuurmansiella angustifolia. The specific epithet angustifolia means "narrow leaf".

== Description ==
Schuurmansiella angustifolia grows as a shrub up to 10 metres (33 ft) tall. The flowers are white with a pink base. The ellipsoid fruits measure up to 0.85 cm (0.3 in) long.

== Distribution and habitat ==
Schuurmansiella angustifolia is endemic to Borneo, where it is confined to western Sarawak. Its habitat is lowland, mainly kerangas, forests to 600 m (2,000 ft) elevation.

== Conservation ==
Schuurmansiella angustifolia has been assessed as near threatened on the IUCN Red List. Outside of protected areas, it is threatened by conversion of its habitat for urban development, plantations and agriculture. The species is present in Bako National Park, Santubong National Park and Kubah National Park, and populations in these protected areas have some stability.
