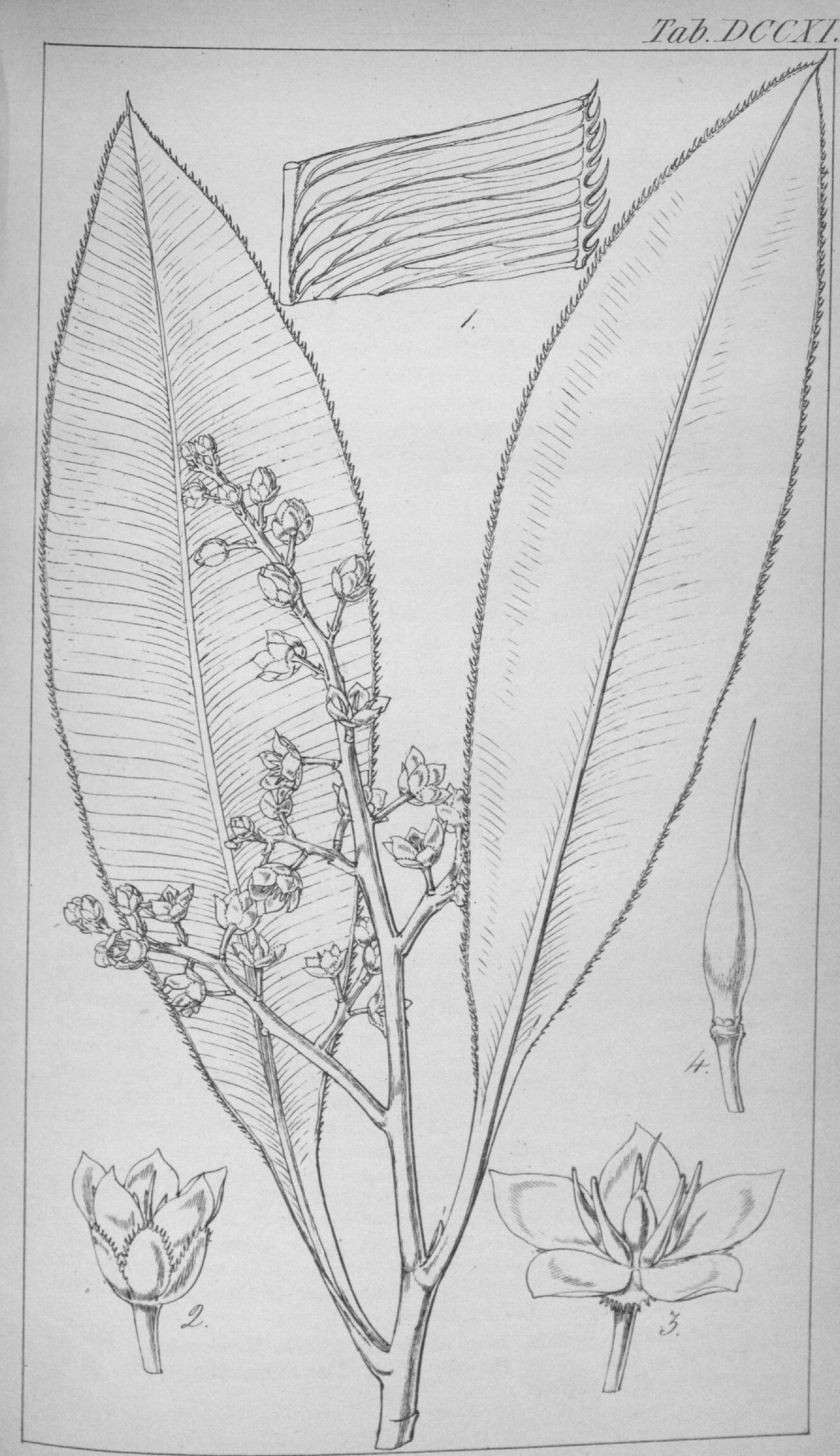
- Euthemis leucocarpa

Scientific classification
- Kingdom: Plantae
- Clade: Tracheophytes
- Clade: Angiosperms
- Clade: Eudicots
- Clade: Rosids
- Order: Malpighiales
- Family: Ochnaceae
- Subfamily: Ochnoideae
- Tribe: Sauvagesieae
- Genus: Euthemis; Jack

Species
- See text

= Euthemis =

Genus of flowering plants

Euthemis is a genus of plant in the family Ochnaceae. The generic name is from the Greek meaning "good law", referring to the even thickness and symmetry of the leaves.

== Description ==
Euthemis species grow as shrubs. The flowers are white or pink. The fruits form as berries.

== Distribution and habitat ==
Euthemis species grow naturally in Vietnam, Cambodia, Thailand, Peninsular Malaysia and Sumatra, Borneo. Their habitat is kerangas and peat swamp forests from sea-level to 1,250 metres (4,000 ft) elevation.

== Species ==
As of May 2014 The Plant List recognises 2 accepted species:

- Euthemis leucocarpa Jack
- Euthemis minor Jack
