= Schuurmansia elegans =

Conservation status
- Least Concern (IUCN 3.1)

Scientific classification
- Kingdom: Plantae
- Clade: Tracheophytes
- Clade: Angiosperms
- Clade: Eudicots
- Clade: Rosids
- Order: Malpighiales
- Family: Ochnaceae
- Genus: Schuurmansia
- Species: S. elegans

Binomial name
- Schuurmansia elegans Blume

Synonyms
- Schuurmansia borneensis Ridl.; Schuurmansia parviflora Ridl.

Species of tree

Schuurmansia elegans is a tree in the family Ochnaceae.

== Description ==
Schuurmansia elegans grows up to 5 m (16 ft) tall. The leaves are oblong to ovate and measure up to 30 cm (12 in) long. The flowers are yellow.

== Taxonomy ==
Schuurmansia elegans was described by German-Dutch botanist Carl Ludwig Blume in 1850. The type specimen was collected on Ambon Island in the Maluku Islands. The specific epithet elegans means 'elegant'.

== Distribution and habitat ==
Schuurmansia elegans is native to Borneo, Sulawesi, the Maluku Islands, the Philippines and New Guinea. Its habitat is in forests, sometimes in swamps or by rivers, from sea level to 3,200 m (10,000 ft) elevation.

== Conservation ==
Schuurmansia elegans has been assessed as least concern on the IUCN Red List. It is threatened by fire, by conversion of its habitat for agriculture and by urban development. The species is present in numerous protected areas including Kinabalu Park in Borneo, Lore Lindu National Park in Sulawesi and Mount Wilhelm in Papua New Guinea.
