= Campylospermum oliveri =

Conservation status
- Least Concern (IUCN 3.1)

Scientific classification
- Kingdom: Plantae
- Clade: Tracheophytes
- Clade: Angiosperms
- Clade: Eudicots
- Clade: Rosids
- Order: Malpighiales
- Family: Ochnaceae
- Genus: Campylospermum
- Species: C. oliveri

Binomial name
- Campylospermum oliveri (Tiegh.) Farron

Synonyms
- Notocampylum oliveri Tiegh.; Ouratea oliveri (Tiegh.) Keay; Campylospermum letouzeyi Farron; Campylospermum zenkeri (Tiegh.) Farron; Diphyllopodium zenkeri Tiegh.; Exomicrum oliveri Tiegh.; Gomphia mannii var. brachypoda Oliv.; Ouratea ambacensis Hutch. & Dalziel; Ouratea mannii var. brachypoda (Oliv.) Gilg; Ouratea zenkeri Engl. & Gilg

Species of flowering plant

Campylospermum oliveri is a species of plant in the Ochnaceae family. It is endemic to Cameroon. Its natural habitat is subtropical or tropical moist lowland forests. It is threatened by habitat loss.
