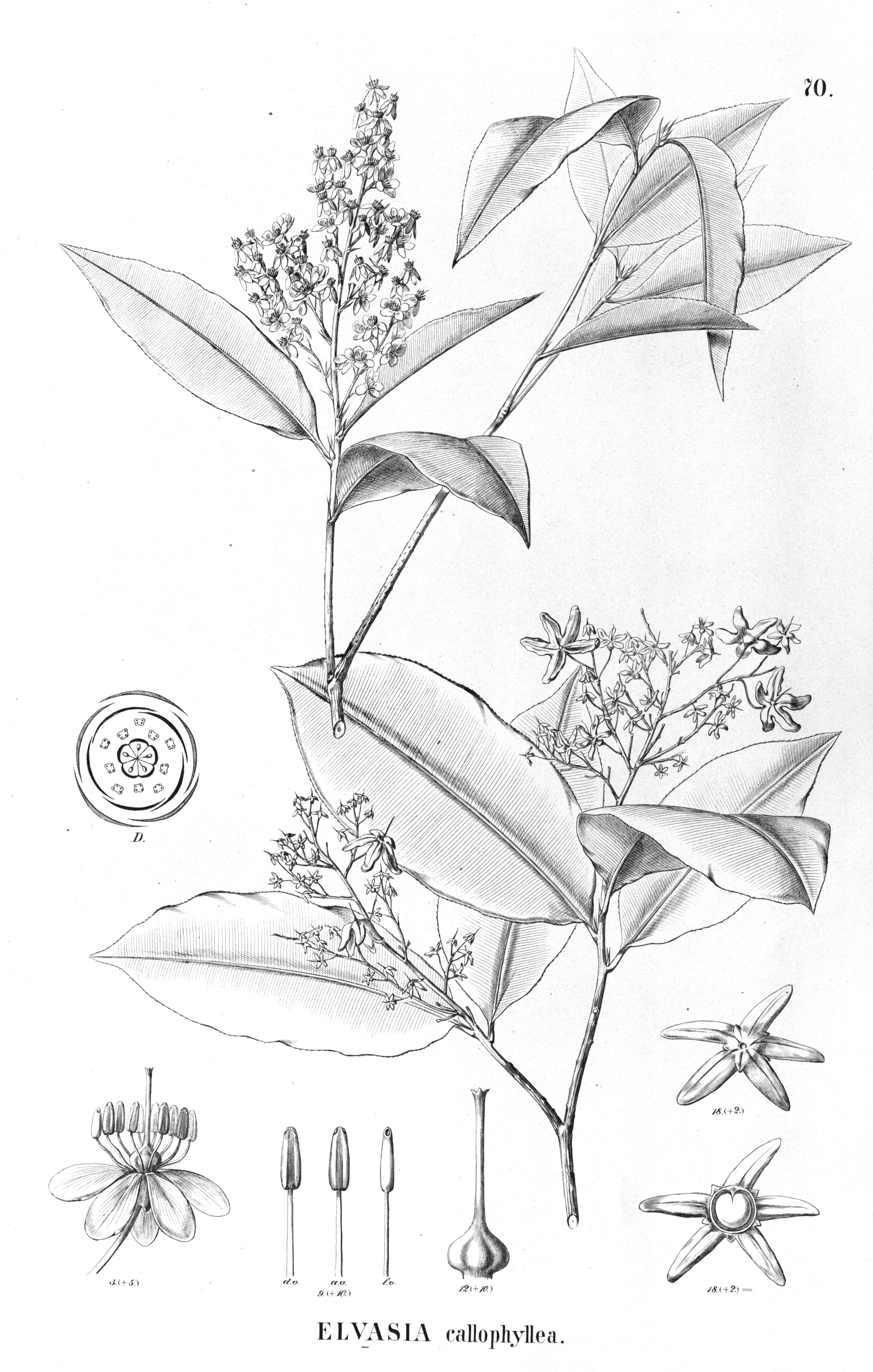
- Illustration of Elvasia calophyllea

Scientific classification
- Kingdom: Plantae
- Clade: Embryophytes
- Clade: Tracheophytes
- Clade: Spermatophytes
- Clade: Angiosperms
- Clade: Eudicots
- Clade: Rosids
- Order: Malpighiales
- Family: Ochnaceae
- Subfamily: Ochnoideae
- Tribe: Ochneae
- Subtribe: Elvasiinae
- Genus: Elvasia; DC. (1811)

Species
- 14; see text

Synonyms
- Hostmannia Planch. (1845); Trichovaselia Tiegh. (1902); Vaselia Tiegh. (1902)

= Elvasia =

Genus of flowering plants

Elvasia is a Neotropical genus of plants in the family Ochnaceae. It includes 14 species native to the tropical Americas, ranging from Belize to Bolivia and southeastern Brazil.

- Elvasia bisepala Sastre & Whitef.
- Elvasia brevipedicellata Ule
- Elvasia calophyllea DC.
- Elvasia canescens (Tiegh.) Gilg
- Elvasia capixaba Fraga & Saavedra
- Elvasia elvasioides (Planch.) Gilg
- Elvasia essequibensis Engl.
- Elvasia gigantifolia Fraga & Saavedra
- Elvasia kollmannii Fraga & Saavedra
- Elvasia macrostipularis Sastre & Lescure
- Elvasia oligandra Cuatrec.
- Elvasia quinqueloba Spruce ex Engl.
- Elvasia sphaerocarpa R.S.Cowan
- Elvasia tricarpellata Sastre
