= Philacra =

Scientific classification
- Kingdom: Plantae
- Clade: Tracheophytes
- Clade: Angiosperms
- Clade: Eudicots
- Clade: Rosids
- Order: Malpighiales
- Family: Ochnaceae
- Subfamily: Ochnoideae
- Tribe: Luxemburgieae
- Genus: Philacra; Dwyer

Genus of plants

Philacra is a genus of flowering plants belonging to the family Ochnaceae.

Its native range is Venezuela to Northern Brazil.

Species:

- Philacra auriculata Dwyer
- Philacra duidae (Gleason) Dwyer
- Philacra longifolia (Gleason) Dwyer
- Philacra steyermarkii Maguire
