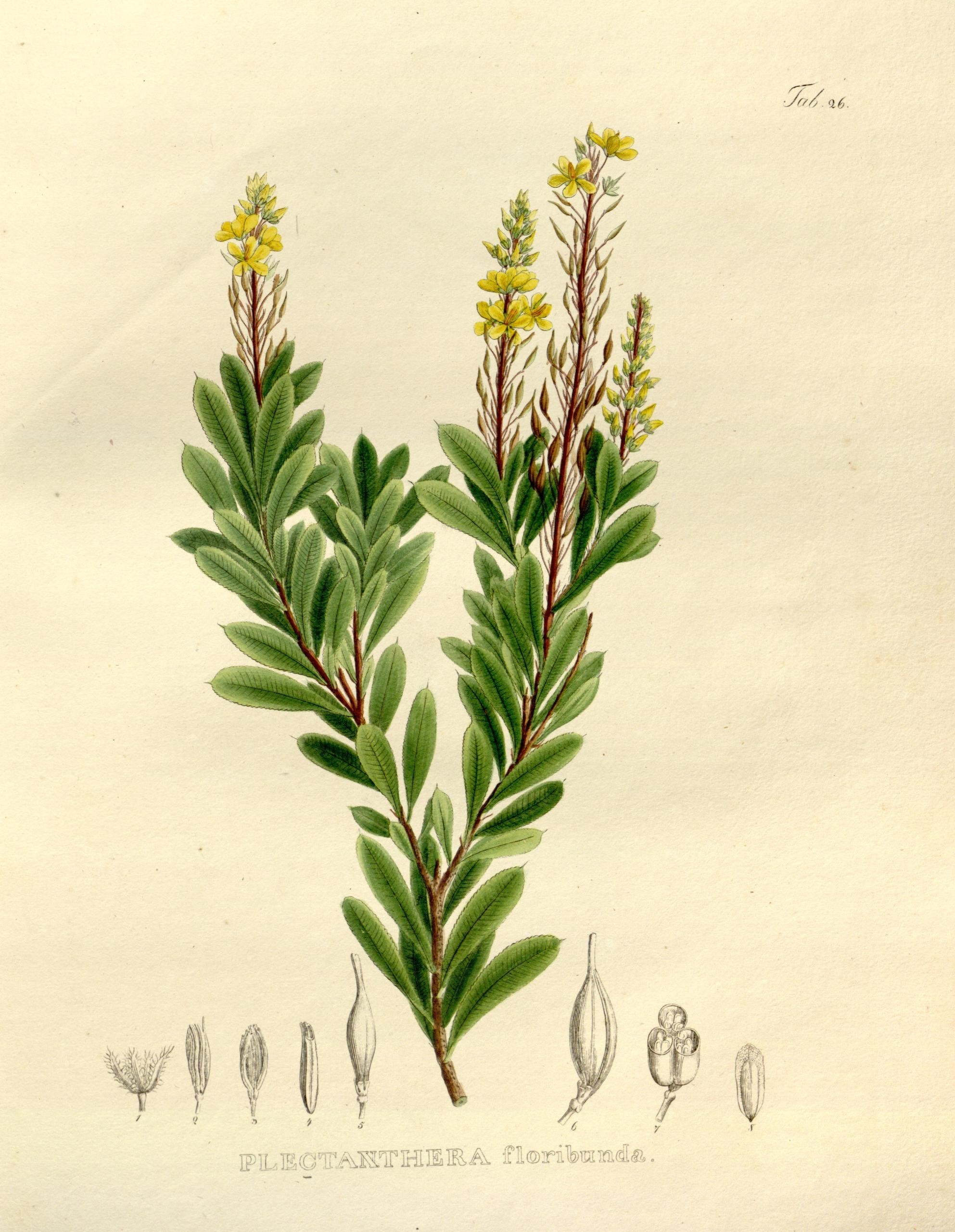
- Luxemburgia octandra

Scientific classification
- Kingdom: Plantae
- Clade: Tracheophytes
- Clade: Angiosperms
- Clade: Eudicots
- Clade: Rosids
- Order: Malpighiales
- Family: Ochnaceae
- Subfamily: Ochnoideae
- Tribe: Luxemburgieae
- Genus: Luxemburgia; A.St.-Hil.

Synonyms
- Charidion Bong.; Epiblepharis Tiegh.; Hilairella Tiegh.; Periblepharis Tiegh.; Plectanthera Mart.

= Luxemburgia =

Genus of plants

Luxemburgia is a genus of flowering plants belonging to the family Ochnaceae.

It is native to Brazil.

The genus name of Luxemburgia is in honour of Charles Emmanuel Sigismond de Montmorency-Luxembourg (1774–1861), French duke of Piney-Luxembourg and also a botanical patron. It was first described and published in Mém. Mus. Hist. Nat. Vol.9 on page 352 in 1822.

== Species ==
According to Kew:

- Luxemburgia angustifolia Planch.
- Luxemburgia bracteata Dwyer
- Luxemburgia ciliatibracteata Sastre
- Luxemburgia ciliosa (Mart.) Gardner
- Luxemburgia corymbosa A.St.-Hil.
- Luxemburgia damazioana Beauverd
- Luxemburgia diciliata Dwyer
- Luxemburgia flexuosa Sastre
- Luxemburgia furnensis Feres
- Luxemburgia glazioviana (Engl.) Beauverd
- Luxemburgia hatschbachiana Sastre
- Luxemburgia leitonii Feres
- Luxemburgia macedoi Dwyer
- Luxemburgia mogolensis Feres
- Luxemburgia mysteriosa Fraga & Feres
- Luxemburgia nobilis Eichler ex Engl.
- Luxemburgia octandra A.St.-Hil.
- Luxemburgia polyandra A.St.-Hil.
- Luxemburgia schwackeana Taub.
- Luxemburgia speciosa A.St.-Hil.
