= Rhytidanthera =

Scientific classification
- Kingdom: Plantae
- Clade: Tracheophytes
- Clade: Angiosperms
- Clade: Eudicots
- Clade: Rosids
- Order: Malpighiales
- Family: Ochnaceae
- Subfamily: Ochnoideae
- Tribe: Sauvagesieae
- Genus: Rhytidanthera; Tiegh.

Genus of plants

Rhytidanthera is a genius of flowering plants belonging to the family Ochnaceae.

Its native range is Colombia.

Species:

- Rhytidanthera magnifica (Gleason) Dwyer
- Rhytidanthera splendida (Planch.) Tiegh.
