= Froesia gereauana =

Scientific classification
- Kingdom: Plantae
- Clade: Tracheophytes
- Clade: Angiosperms
- Clade: Eudicots
- Clade: Rosids
- Order: Malpighiales
- Family: Ochnaceae
- Genus: Froesia
- Species: F. gereauana

Binomial name
- Froesia gereauana J.V. Schneid. & Zizka

Species of flowering plant

Froesia gereauana is a plant species endemic to the State of Amazonas in southern Venezuela.

Froesia gereauana is an unbranched tree up to 12 m tall. Leaves are crowded at the top of the trunk. Petiole is over 30 cm long. Leaves pinnately compound with approximately 27 leaflets, each one oblong to ovate, thick and leathery, up to 31 cm long. Inflorescence is at the top of the trunk, with flowers up to 10 mm long. Fruit is a dry, fibrous follicle, spherical to pear-shaped, about 2 cm in diameter.
