= Perissocarpa =

Scientific classification
- Kingdom: Plantae
- Clade: Tracheophytes
- Clade: Angiosperms
- Clade: Eudicots
- Clade: Rosids
- Order: Malpighiales
- Family: Ochnaceae
- Subfamily: Ochnoideae
- Tribe: Ochneae
- Subtribe: Elvasiinae
- Genus: Perissocarpa; Steyerm. & Maguire

Genus of plants

Perissocarpa is a genus of flowering plants belonging to the family Ochnaceae.

Its native range is Southern Tropical America.

Species:

- Perissocarpa ondox B.Walln.
- Perissocarpa steyermarkii (Maguire) Steyerm. & Maguire
- Perissocarpa umbellifera Steyerm. & Maguire
