= Poecilandra =

Scientific classification
- Kingdom: Plantae
- Clade: Tracheophytes
- Clade: Angiosperms
- Clade: Eudicots
- Clade: Rosids
- Order: Malpighiales
- Family: Ochnaceae
- Subfamily: Ochnoideae
- Tribe: Sauvagesieae
- Genus: Poecilandra; Tul.

Genus of plants

Poecilandra is a genus of flowering plants belonging to the family Ochnaceae.

Its native range is Southern Tropical America.

Species:

- Poecilandra pumila Steyerm.
- Poecilandra retusa Tul.
