= Sauvagesia brevipetala =

Conservation status
- Vulnerable (IUCN 3.1)

Scientific classification
- Kingdom: Plantae
- Clade: Tracheophytes
- Clade: Angiosperms
- Clade: Eudicots
- Clade: Rosids
- Order: Malpighiales
- Family: Ochnaceae
- Genus: Sauvagesia
- Species: S. brevipetala

Binomial name
- Sauvagesia brevipetala Gilli

Species of flowering plant

Sauvagesia brevipetala is a species of plant in the family Ochnaceae. It is endemic to Ecuador.
