= Schuurmansia =

Scientific classification
- Kingdom: Plantae
- Clade: Tracheophytes
- Clade: Angiosperms
- Clade: Eudicots
- Clade: Rosids
- Order: Malpighiales
- Family: Ochnaceae
- Subfamily: Ochnoideae
- Tribe: Sauvagesieae
- Genus: Schuurmansia; Blume

Genus of plants

Schuurmansia is a genus of flowering plants belonging to the family Ochnaceae.

Its native range is Malesia to Papuasia.

Species:

- Schuurmansia elegans Blume
- Schuurmansia henningsii K.Schum.
- Schuurmansia vidalii (Cerón) Merr.
