= Rhabdophyllum arnoldianum =

Scientific classification
- Kingdom: Plantae
- Clade: Tracheophytes
- Clade: Angiosperms
- Clade: Eudicots
- Clade: Rosids
- Order: Malpighiales
- Family: Ochnaceae
- Genus: Rhabdophyllum
- Species: R. arnoldianum

Binomial name
- Rhabdophyllum arnoldianum (De Wild. & T.Durand) Tiegh.

Synonyms
- Ouratea arnoldiana De Wild. & T.Durand; Ouratea barteri (Tiegh.) Hutch. & Dalziel; Ouratea longipes (Tiegh.) T.Durand & H.Durand; Ouratea quintasii (Tiegh.) Exell; Ouratea staudtii (Tiegh.) Keay; Ouratea vanderystii De Wild.; Rhabdophyllum arnoldianum var. quintasii (Tiegh.) Farron; Rhabdophyllum arnoldianum var. staudtii (Tiegh.) Farron; Rhabdophyllum barteri Tiegh.; Rhabdophyllum longipes Tiegh.; Rhabdophyllum quintasii Tiegh.; Rhabdophyllum staudtii Tiegh.; Rhabdophyllum thollonii Tiegh.; Rhabdophyllum viancinii Tiegh.; Spongopyrena staudtii Tiegh.

Species of tree

Rhabdophyllum arnoldianum, synonyms including Ouratea quintasii, is a species of plant in the family Ochnaceae. It is native to tropical Africa from Nigeria to South Sudan. It is a shrub or tree.

== Distribution ==
Rhabdophyllum arnoldianum is native to tropical Africa: Cameroon, the Central African Republic, the Republic of the Congo, Equatorial Guinea, Gabon, the Gulf of Guinea islands, Nigeria, Sudan, and the Democratic Republic of the Congo (Zaire).

== Conservation ==
Ouratea quintasii was assessed as "vulnerable" for the 1998 IUCN Red List, where it is said to be native only to São Tomé Island. As of April 2023, O. quintasii was regarded as a synonym of Rhabdophyllum arnoldianum, which has a much wider distribution.
