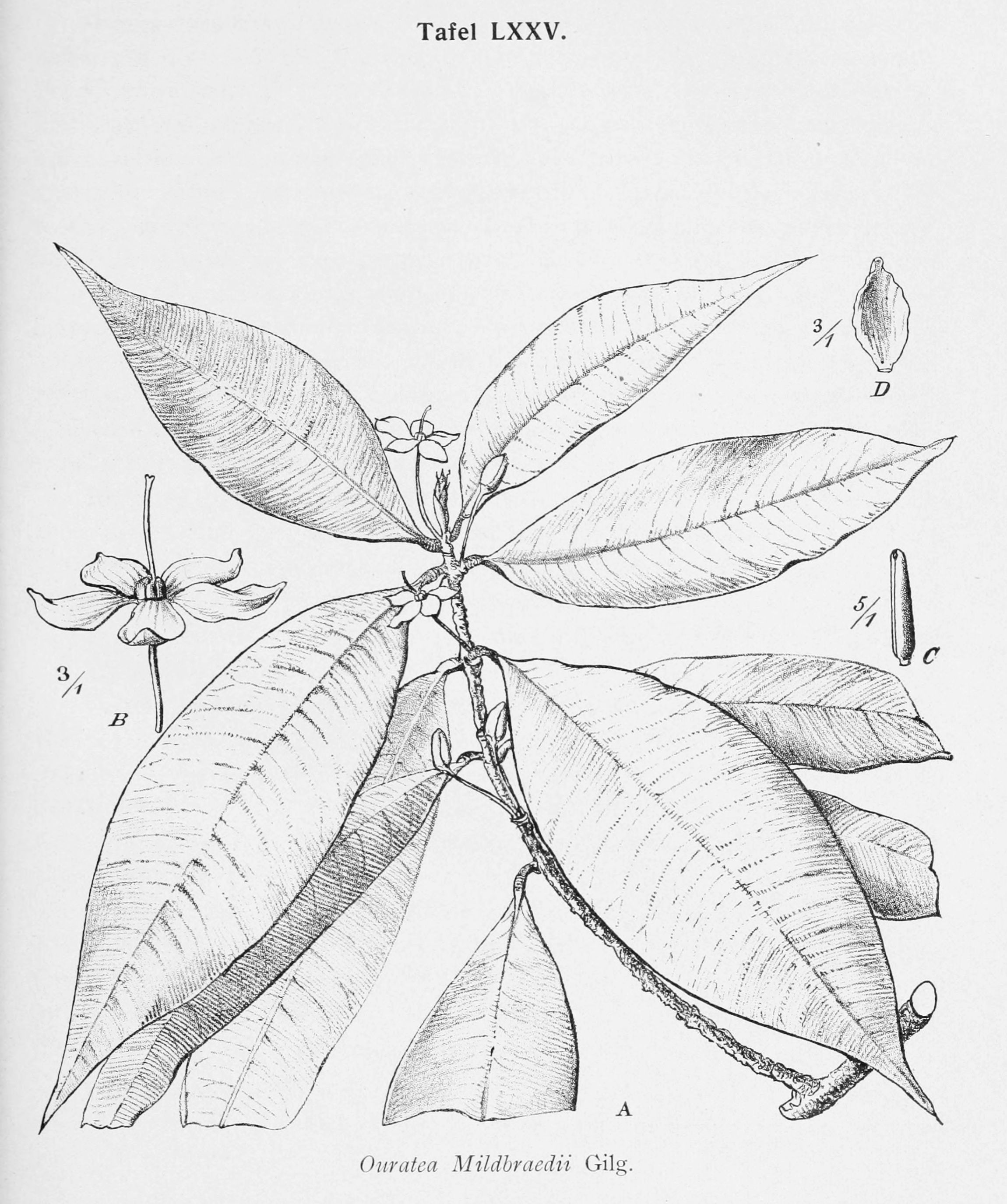
- Botanical illustration

Scientific classification
- Kingdom: Plantae
- Clade: Tracheophytes
- Clade: Angiosperms
- Clade: Eudicots
- Clade: Rosids
- Order: Malpighiales
- Family: Ochnaceae
- Subfamily: Ochnoideae
- Tribe: Ochneae
- Subtribe: Ochninae
- Genus: Idertia; Farron
- Species: I. axillaris

Binomial name
- Idertia axillaris (Oliv.) Farron

= Idertia =

Genus of flowering plants

Idertia is a monotypic genus of flowering plants belonging to the family Ochnaceae. The only species is Idertia axillaris.

Its native range is Western Tropical Africa to Uganda.
