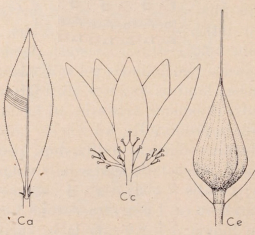
- Illustration of Adenarake muriculata, accompanying the genus protologue.

Scientific classification
- Kingdom: Plantae
- Clade: Tracheophytes
- Clade: Angiosperms
- Clade: Eudicots
- Clade: Rosids
- Order: Malpighiales
- Family: Ochnaceae
- Subfamily: Ochnoideae
- Tribe: Sauvagesieae
- Genus: Adenarake; Maguire & Wurdack

= Adenarake =

Genus of flowering plants

Adenarake is a genus of flowering plants belonging to the family Ochnaceae.

Its native range is Venezuela.

Species:

- Adenarake macrocarpa Sastre
- Adenarake muriculata Maguire & Wurdack
