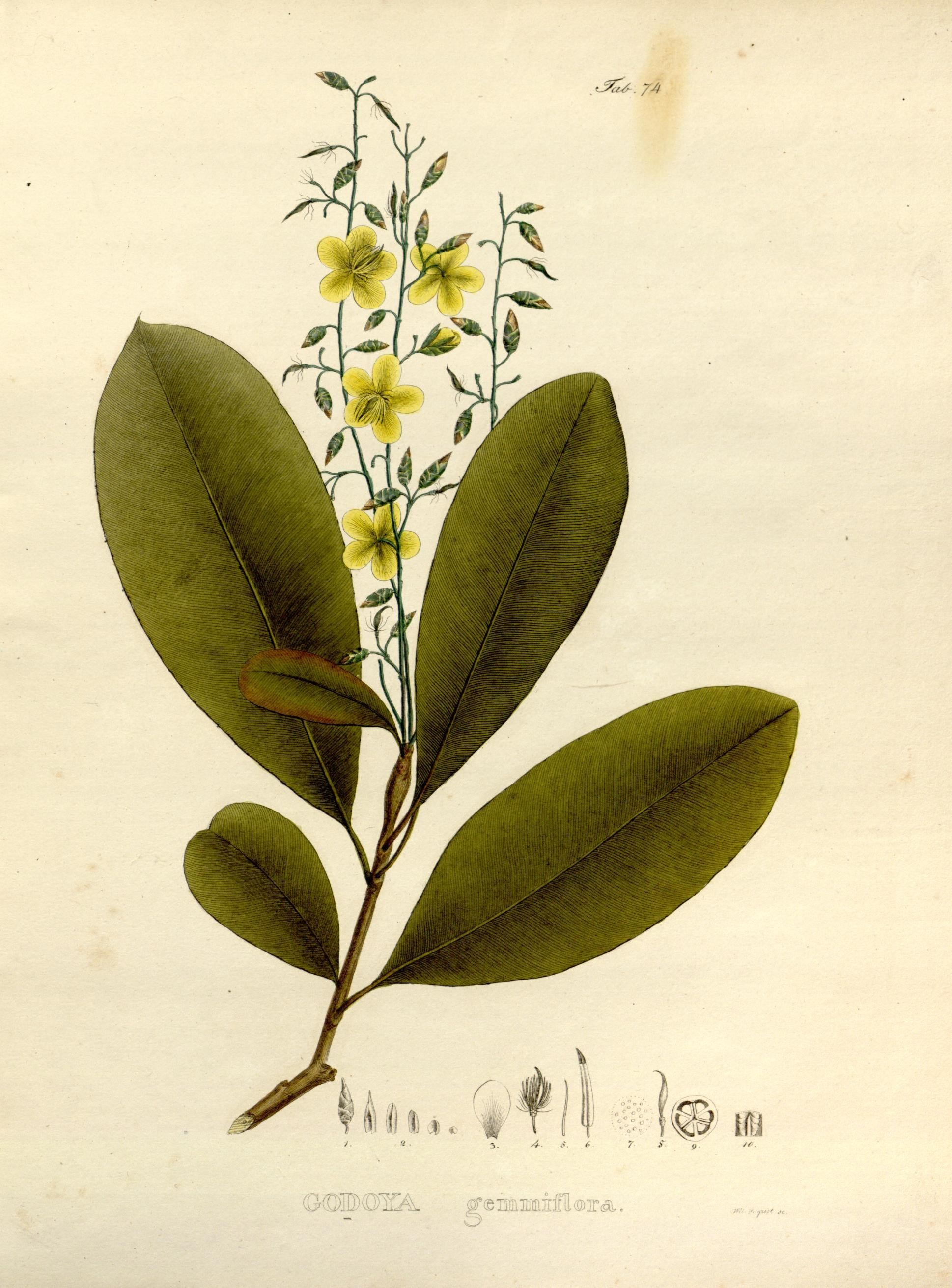
- A depiction of Blastemanthus gemmiflorus

Scientific classification
- Kingdom: Plantae
- Clade: Tracheophytes
- Clade: Angiosperms
- Clade: Eudicots
- Clade: Rosids
- Order: Malpighiales
- Family: Ochnaceae
- Subfamily: Ochnoideae
- Tribe: Sauvagesieae
- Genus: Blastemanthus; Planch.

= Blastemanthus =

Genus of flowering plants

Blastemanthus is a genus of flowering plants belonging to the family Ochnaceae.

Its native range is Southern Tropical America.

Species:

- Blastemanthus gemmiflorus (Mart.) Planch.
- Blastemanthus grandiflorus Spruce ex Engl.
