= Fleurydora =

Conservation status
- Endangered (IUCN 3.1)

Scientific classification
- Kingdom: Plantae
- Clade: Tracheophytes
- Clade: Angiosperms
- Clade: Eudicots
- Clade: Rosids
- Order: Malpighiales
- Family: Ochnaceae
- Subfamily: Ochnoideae
- Tribe: Sauvagesieae
- Genus: Fleurydora; A.Chev.
- Species: F. felicis

Binomial name
- Fleurydora felicis A.Chev.

Genus of flowering plants

Fleurydora is a monotypic genus of plants in the family Ochnaceae. The only species is Fleurydora felicis. It is endemic to Guinea. F felicis is a shrub or small tree, growing up to 15 meters in height. It grows on rocky areas in the Guinean forest–savanna and Guinean montane forests ecoregions. It has large yellow flowers. Its fruits are small flattened winged seeds, which are dispersed by wind, unlike other species of Ochnaceae which have fleshy fruits.

Its conservation is threatened by harvesting, mining and fires. This plant is harvested both for medicinal purposes and for firewood.
