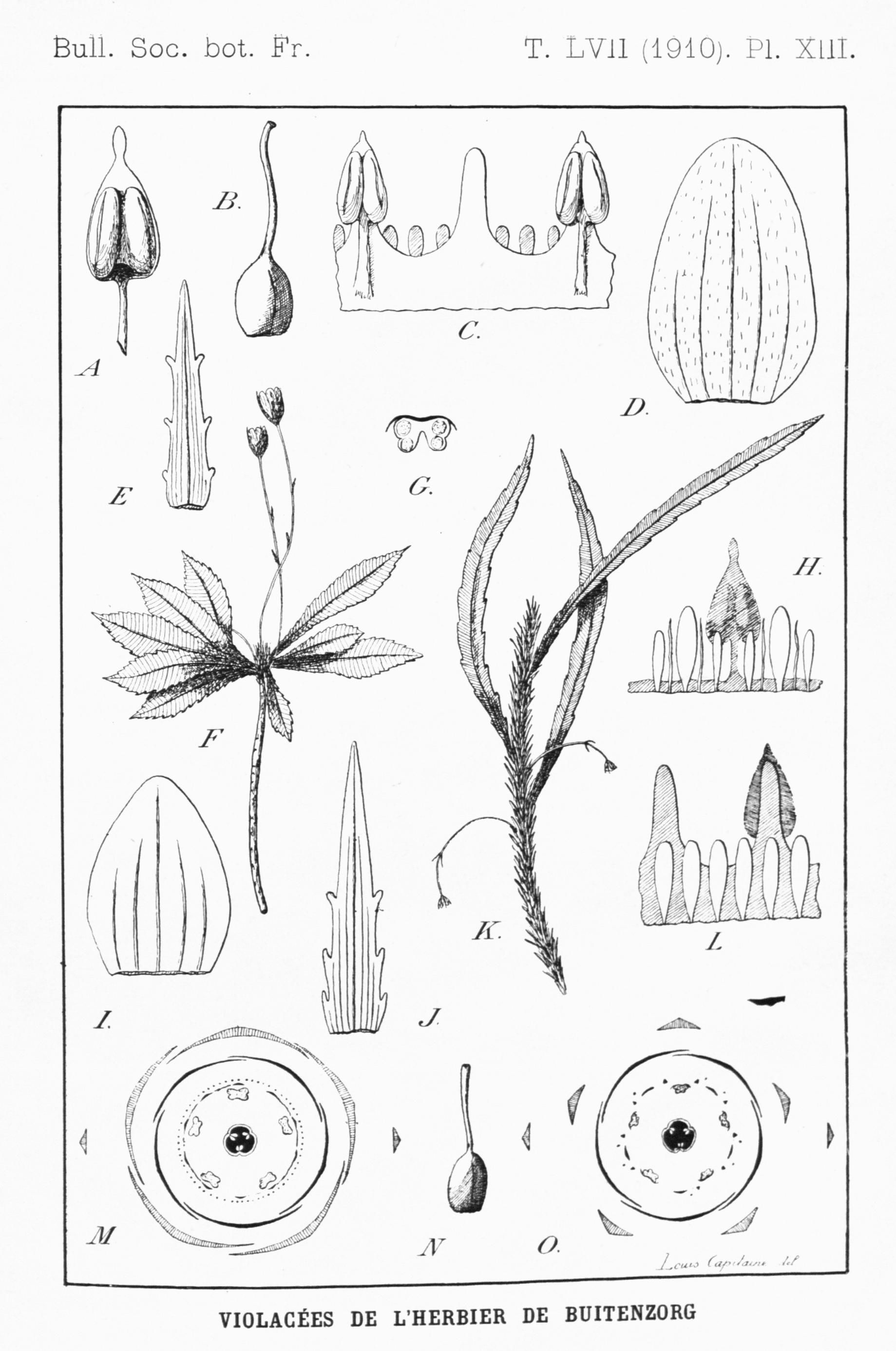

Scientific classification
- Kingdom: Plantae
- Clade: Tracheophytes
- Clade: Angiosperms
- Clade: Eudicots
- Clade: Rosids
- Order: Malpighiales
- Family: Ochnaceae
- Genus: Neckia; Korth. (1848)
- Species: N. serrata

Binomial name
- Neckia serrata Korth. (1848)

Synonyms
- Neckia distans Ridl. (1907 publ. 1908); Neckia grandifolia Ridl. (1925); Neckia humilis Hook.f. (1860); Neckia klossii Ridl. (1907 publ. 1908); Neckia klossii var. borneensis Airy Shaw (1940); Neckia lancifolia Hook.f. (1860); Neckia lancifolia f. major (Ridl.) Airy Shaw (1940); Neckia malayana Ridl. (1907 publ. 1908); Neckia malayana var. angustifolia Ridl. (1907 publ. 1908); Neckia malayana f. major Ridl. (1922); Neckia malayana f. minor Ridl. (1922); Neckia obovata Airy Shaw (1940); Neckia ovalifolia Capit. (1910); Neckia parviflora Ridl. (1907 publ. 1908); Neckia philippinensis Merr. & Quisumb. (1954); Sauvagesia jaheriana Capit. (1910); Sauvagesia serrata (Korth.) Sastre (1971)

= Neckia =

Species of flowering plant

Neckia serrata is a species of flowering plant in the family Ochnaceae. It is a shrub or subshrub native to Borneo, Peninsular Malaysia, Sumatra, and the Philippines. It is the sole species in genus Neckia.
