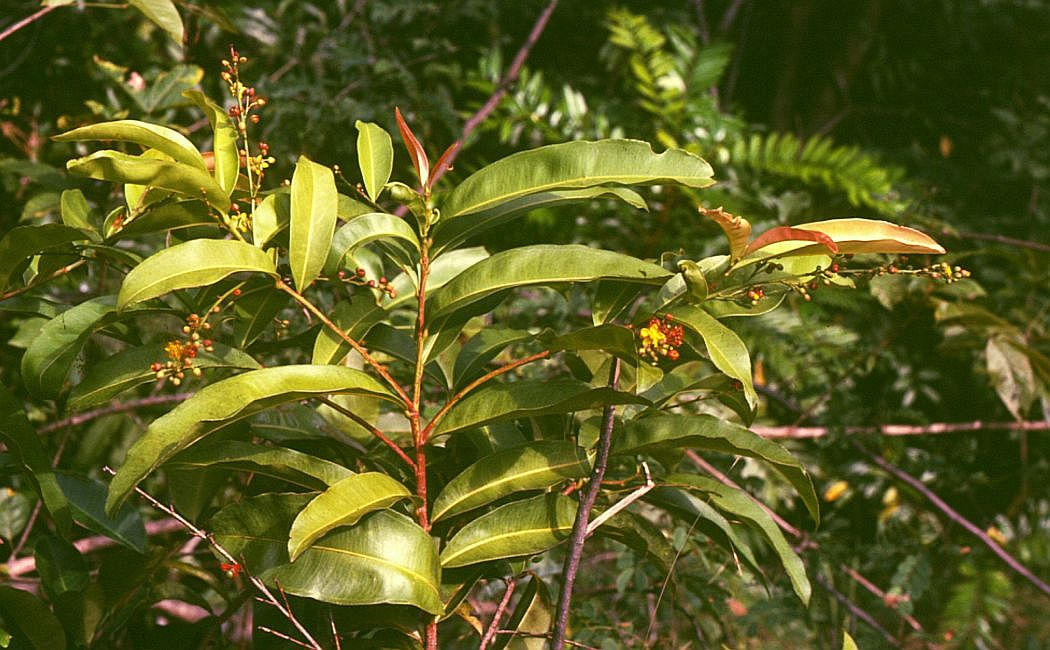
- Campylospermum serratum

Scientific classification
- Kingdom: Plantae
- Clade: Tracheophytes
- Clade: Angiosperms
- Clade: Eudicots
- Clade: Rosids
- Order: Malpighiales
- Family: Ochnaceae
- Subfamily: Ochnoideae
- Tribe: Ochneae
- Subtribe: Ochninae
- Genus: Campylospermum; Tiegh. (1902)

Species
- 55; see text

Synonyms
- Bisetaria Tiegh. (1902); Campylocercum Tiegh. (1902); Correia Vell. (1796); Diphyllanthus Tiegh. (1902); Diphyllopodium Tiegh. (1902); Exomicrum Tiegh. (1902); Maesia Gaertn. (1788); Meesia Gaertn. (1788); Monelasmum Tiegh. (1902); Notocampylum Tiegh. (1902); Spongopyrena Tiegh. (1902); Walkera Schreb. (1789)

= Campylospermum =

Genus of flowering plants

Campylospermum is a genus of flowering plants in the family Ochnaceae. It includes 55 species native to tropical Africa, India, Indochina, Hainan, and western Malesia.

Species include:

- Campylospermum amplectens (Stapf) Farron
- Campylospermum anceps (Baker) H.Perrier
- Campylospermum andongense (Hiern) Biss.
- Campylospermum angulatum (DC.) Tiegh.
- Campylospermum auriculatum Biss.
- Campylospermum barberi (Manickam & Murugan) Karthik. & V.S.Kumar
- Campylospermum bukobense (Gilg) Farron
- Campylospermum cabrae (Gilg) Farron
- Campylospermum calanthum (Gilg) Farron
- Campylospermum claessensii (De Wild.) Farron
- Campylospermum congestum (Oliv.) Farron
- Campylospermum costatum (Tiegh.) Biss.
- Campylospermum deltoideum (Baker) Tiegh.
- Campylospermum densiflorum (De Wild. & T.Durand) Farron
- Campylospermum dependens (DC.) H.Perrier
- Campylospermum descoingsii Farron
- Campylospermum duparquetianum (Baill.) Tiegh.
- Campylospermum dybovskii Tiegh.
- Campylospermum elongatum (Oliv.) Tiegh.
- Campylospermum engama (De Wild.) Farron
- Campylospermum excavatum (Tiegh.) Farron
- Campylospermum flavum (Schumach. & Thonn.) Farron
- Campylospermum gabonense Biss.
- Campylospermum glaberrimum (P.Beauv.) Farron
- Campylospermum glaucifolium Biss.
- Campylospermum glaucum (Tiegh.) Farron
- Campylospermum glomeratum (Tiegh.) Biss.
- Campylospermum klainei (Tiegh.) Farron
- Campylospermum laeve (De Wild. & T.Durand) Farron
- Campylospermum laevigatum (Vahl) Tiegh.
- Campylospermum laxiflorum (De Wild. & T.Durand) Tiegh.
- Campylospermum lecomtei (Tiegh.) Farron
- Campylospermum longestipulatum (De Wild.) Biss.
- Campylospermum louisii Biss. & Sosef
- Campylospermum lunzuense (N.Robson) Biss.
- Campylospermum lutambense (Sleumer) Biss.
- Campylospermum mannii (Oliv.) Tiegh.
- Campylospermum nutans (Hiern) Biss.
- Campylospermum obtusifolium (DC.) Tiegh.
- Campylospermum occidentale Biss.
- Campylospermum oliveri (Tiegh.) Farron
- Campylospermum paucinervatum Sosef
- Campylospermum perseifolium (Baker) Tiegh.
- Campylospermum reticulatum (P.Beauv.) Farron
- Campylospermum sacleuxii (Tiegh.) Farron
- Campylospermum scheffleri (Engl. & Gilg) Farron
- Campylospermum schoenleinianum (Klotzsch) Farron
- Campylospermum serratum (Gaertn.) Bittrich & M.C.E.Amaral
- Campylospermum squamosum (DC.) Farron
- Campylospermum striatum (Tiegh.) M.C.E.Amaral
- Campylospermum subcordatum (Stapf) Farron
- Campylospermum sulcatum (Tiegh.) Farron
- Campylospermum umbricola (Tiegh.) Farron
- Campylospermum vogelii (Hook.f. ex Planch.) Farron
- Campylospermum warneckei (Gilg ex Engl.) Biss.
