= Wallacea (plant) =

Scientific classification
- Kingdom: Plantae
- Clade: Tracheophytes
- Clade: Angiosperms
- Clade: Eudicots
- Clade: Rosids
- Order: Malpighiales
- Family: Ochnaceae
- Genus: Wallacea; Spruce ex Benth. & Hook.f. (1862)

Species
- Wallacea insignis Spruce ex Benth. & Hook.f.; Wallacea multiflora Ducke; Wallacea riparia Gleason & A.C.Sm.

Genus of flowering plants

Wallacea is a genus of flowering plants in the family Ochnaceae. It includes three species of shrubs or trees native to Colombia, Venezuela, and northern Brazil.

- Wallacea insignis Spruce ex Benth. & Hook.f. – Colombia, Venezuela, and northern Brazil
- Wallacea multiflora Ducke – Colombia, Venezuela, and northern Brazil
- Wallacea riparia Gleason & A.C.Sm. – northern Brazil
