= Sinia rhodoleuca =

Scientific classification
- Kingdom: Plantae
- Clade: Tracheophytes
- Clade: Angiosperms
- Clade: Eudicots
- Clade: Rosids
- Order: Malpighiales
- Family: Ochnaceae
- Genus: Sinia; Diels (1930)
- Species: S. rhodoleuca

Binomial name
- Sinia rhodoleuca Diels (1930)

Synonyms
- Sauvagesia rhodoleuca (Diels) M.C.E.Amaral (2006)

Species of flowering plant

Sinia rhodoleuca is a species of flowering plant in the family Ochnaceae. It is a shrub native to Guangxi and Guangdong provinces in southeastern China. It is the sole species in genus Sinia.
