= Polythecanthum =

Scientific classification
- Kingdom: Plantae
- Clade: Tracheophytes
- Clade: Angiosperms
- Clade: Eudicots
- Clade: Rosids
- Order: Malpighiales
- Family: Ochnaceae
- Genus: Polythecanthum; Tiegh. (1907)
- Species: P. cambodianum

Binomial name
- Polythecanthum cambodianum Pierre ex Tiegh. (1907)

Synonyms
- Diporidium cambodianum Pierre ex Tiegh. (1907)

Genus of flowering plants

Polythecanthum cambodianum is a species of flowering plant belonging to the family Ochnaceae. It is endemic to Cambodia. It is the sole species in genus Polythecanthum.
