= Indovethia =

Scientific classification
- Kingdom: Plantae
- Clade: Tracheophytes
- Clade: Angiosperms
- Clade: Eudicots
- Clade: Rosids
- Order: Malpighiales
- Family: Ochnaceae
- Genus: Indovethia; Boerl. (1894)
- Species: I. calophylla

Binomial name
- Indovethia calophylla Boerl. (1894)

Synonyms
- Indovethia beccariana Bartell. (1902); Sauvagesia calophylla (Boerl.) M.C.E.Amaral (1991)

Genus of flowering plants

Indovethia calophylla is a species of flowering plant in the family Ochnaceae. It is a subshrub or shrub native to western Borneo and western Sumatra. It is the sole species in genus Indovethia.
