= Quiinaceae =

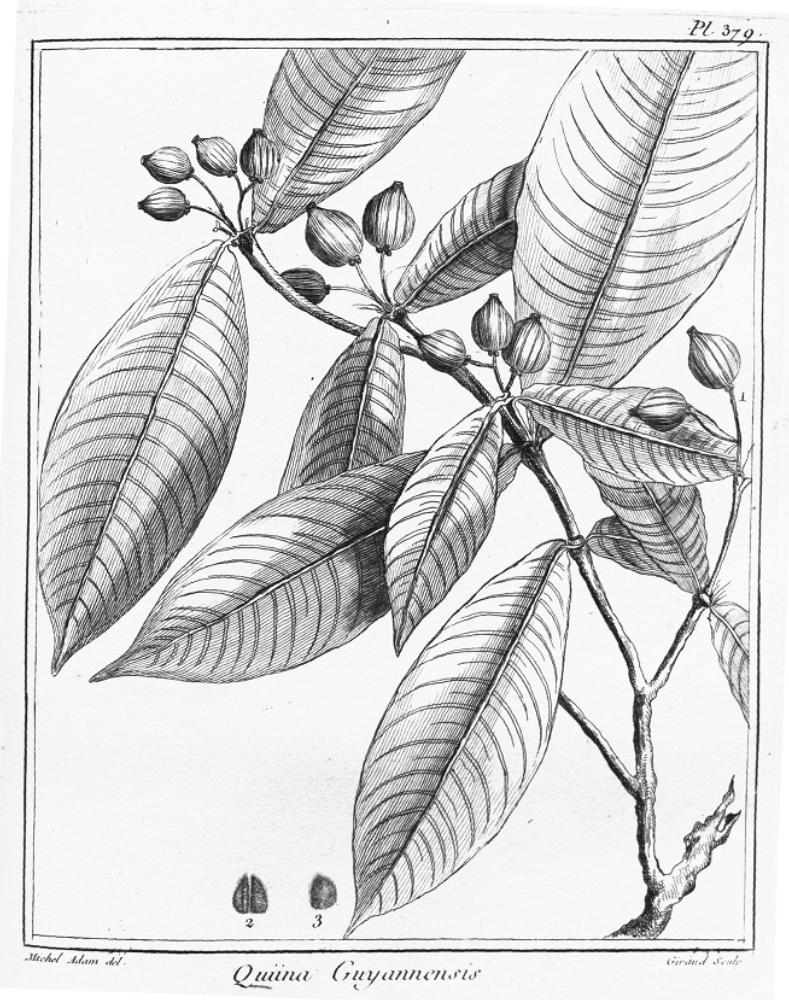
Quiina guianensis

Quiinaceae Engl. is a neotropical family of flowering plants in the Malpighiales, consisting of about 50 species in 4 genera (Froesia, Lacunaria, Quiina, Touroulia). The APG III system of flowering plant classification does not recognize such a family, instead including these genera in the Ochnaceae family.
