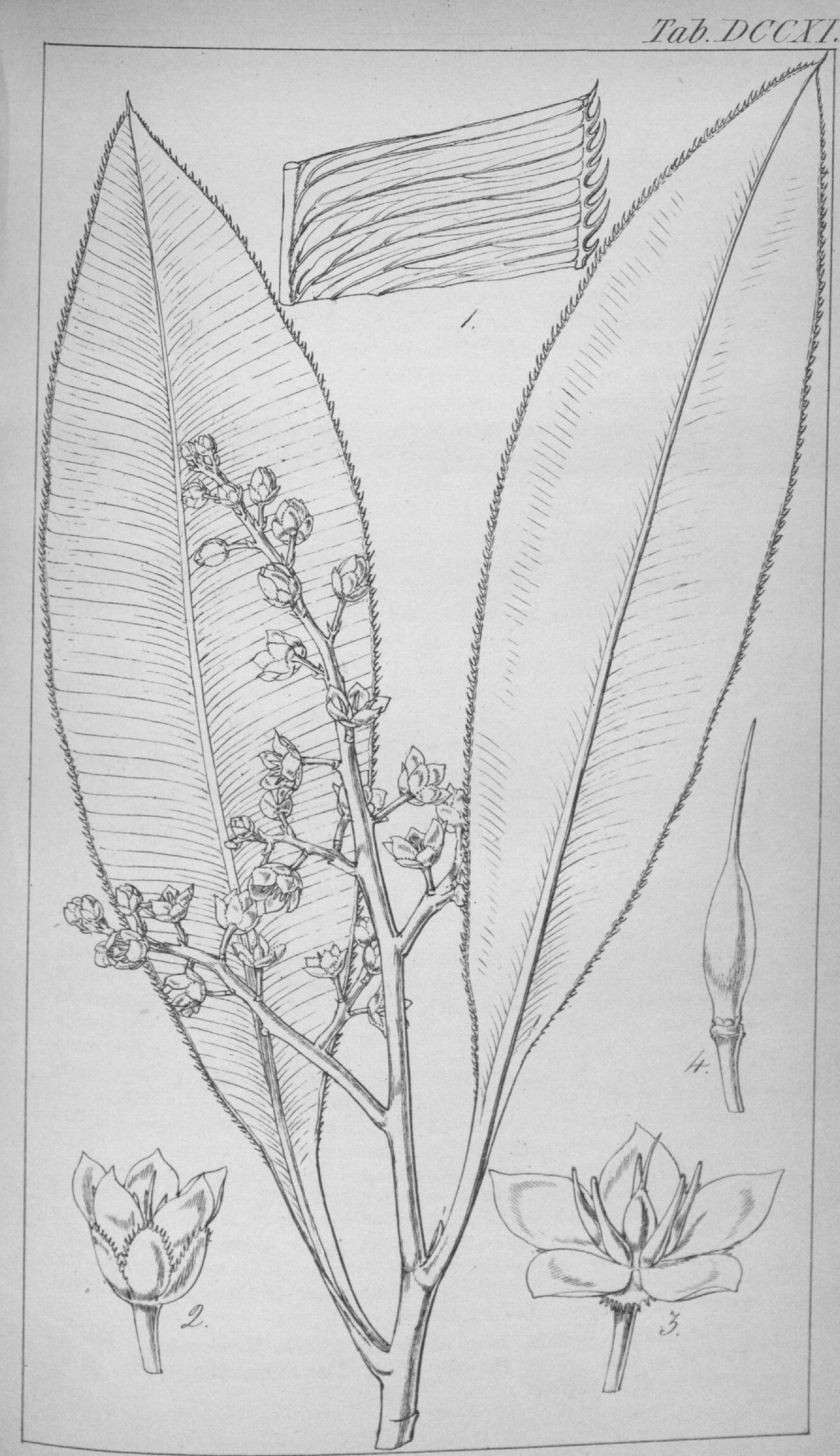

Conservation status
- Least Concern (IUCN 3.1)

Scientific classification
- Kingdom: Plantae
- Clade: Tracheophytes
- Clade: Angiosperms
- Clade: Eudicots
- Clade: Rosids
- Order: Malpighiales
- Family: Ochnaceae
- Genus: Euthemis
- Species: E. leucocarpa

Binomial name
- Euthemis leucocarpa Jack

Synonyms
- Euthemis jackiana Hook.f.; Euthemis robusta Hook.f.

= Euthemis leucocarpa =

Species of plant

Euthemis leucocarpa is a plant in the family Ochnaceae. The specific epithet leucocarpa is from the Greek meaning 'white fruit'.

== Description ==
Euthemis leucocarpa grows as a shrub measuring up to 2 metres (6 ft 7 in) tall. The roundish fruits measure up to 1 cm (0.4 in) in diameter.

== Distribution and habitat ==
Euthemis leucocarpa grows is native to Cambodia, Thailand, Vietnam, Sumatra, Peninsular Malaysia and Borneo. Its habitat is lowland to submontane forests, including peat swamp and kerangas forests, from sea-level to 1,000 metres (3,300 ft) altitude.
