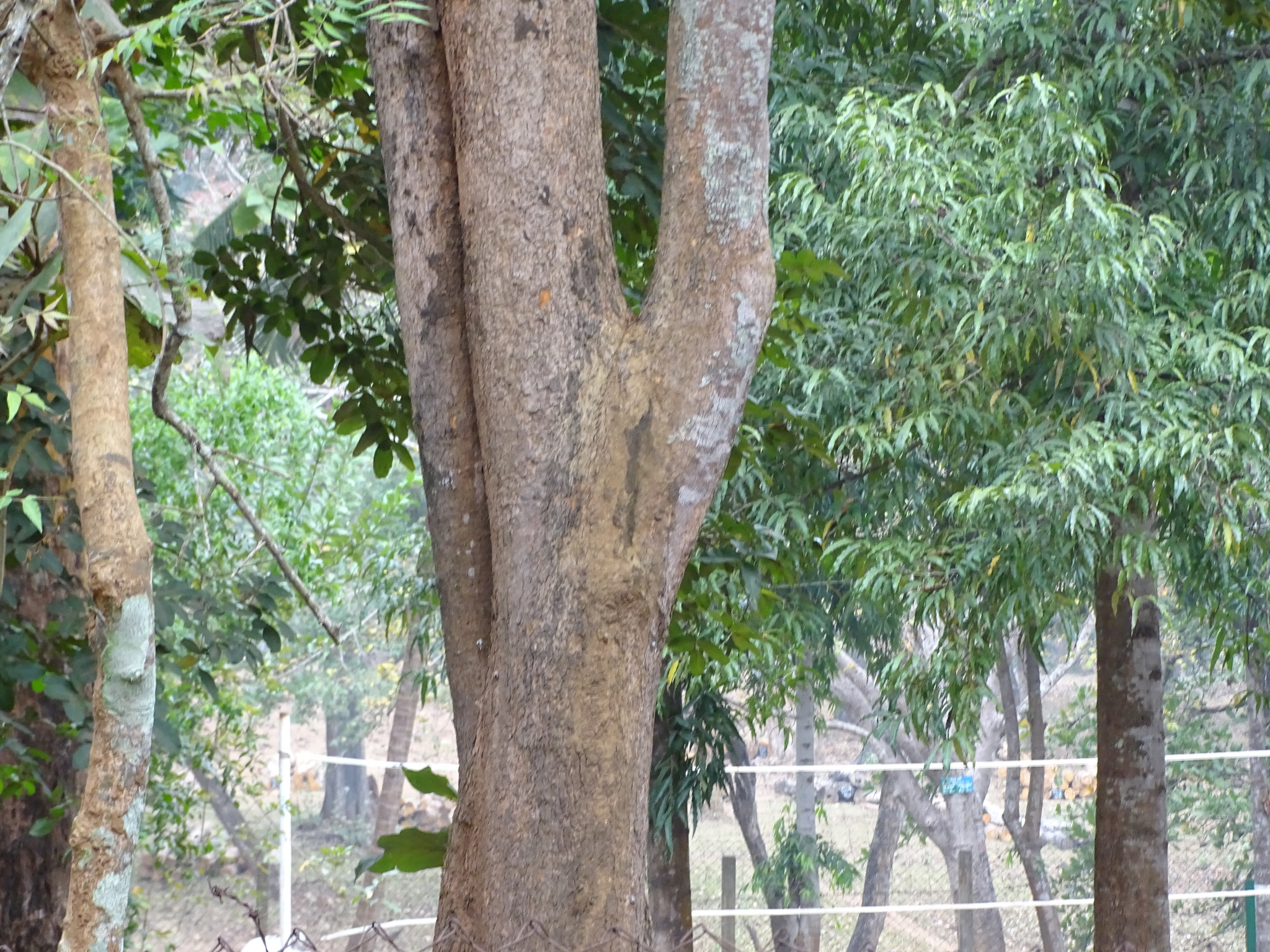

Conservation status
- Vulnerable (IUCN 2.3)

Scientific classification
- Kingdom: Plantae
- Clade: Tracheophytes
- Clade: Angiosperms
- Clade: Eudicots
- Clade: Rosids
- Order: Malpighiales
- Family: Ochnaceae
- Genus: Lophira
- Species: L. alata

Binomial name
- Lophira alata Banks ex Gaertn.

= Lophira alata =

Species of tree

Lophira alata, commonly known as azobé, ekki or the red ironwood tree, is a species of plant in the family Ochnaceae. It is found in Cameroon, the Republic of the Congo, the Democratic Republic of the Congo, Ivory Coast, Equatorial Guinea, Gabon, Ghana, Liberia, Nigeria, Sierra Leone, Sudan, and Uganda. Its natural habitat is subtropical or tropical moist lowland forests. It is threatened by habitat loss.

The timber is extremely hard and used for railroad ties, groynes and bridge planking, as it is rot-resistant.

== Description ==
The trunk of Lophira alata is usually straight, without buttress roots, but sometimes with a swollen base, and is usually clear of branches up to about 30 metres (98 ft). The bark is typically red-brown in colour, up to two centimetres thick, and has a bright yellow layer underneath. Young trees under four metres in height have greenish-grey bark, which becomes pink or light brown as the tree matures. Inside, the living sapwood is pale pink or whitish in colour, while the inner heartwood is dark red-brown to chocolate brown, with conspicuous white deposits of silica. The leaves of L. alata are up to 25 centimetres (9.8 in) long and are tough, fairly narrow and elongated, with a rounded or slightly indented tip, and tend to occur in clusters at the ends of the twigs.

== Biology ==
Lophira alata sheds all its leaves during a short period of one to two weeks, usually in December, and the re-growth of bright red young leaves, often simultaneously on all L. alata trees in an area, can set the canopy ablaze with colour. The flowers of L. alata are white, fairly large, strong-smelling, and grouped in loose, branched, terminal inflorescences. Flowering occurs in adult trees with trunks over 50 centimetres in diameter, and takes place from the time the new leaves appear. L. alata is monoecious, meaning that male and female flowers are found on the same tree, and the flowers are insect-pollinated. Fruiting takes place between January and March, the fruits becoming mature around March to April, although fruits do not always appear every year. The fruits, which are wind-dispersed, contain a single, oil-rich seed in a conical capsule, which is brown when mature and is surrounded by two unequally-sized membranous ‘wings’, one up to six centimetres long and the other twice that size. Although L. alata needs full sunlight to grow, seedlings can persist for some time in the shady undergrowth and resume growth if breaks in the canopy occur.

== Uses ==
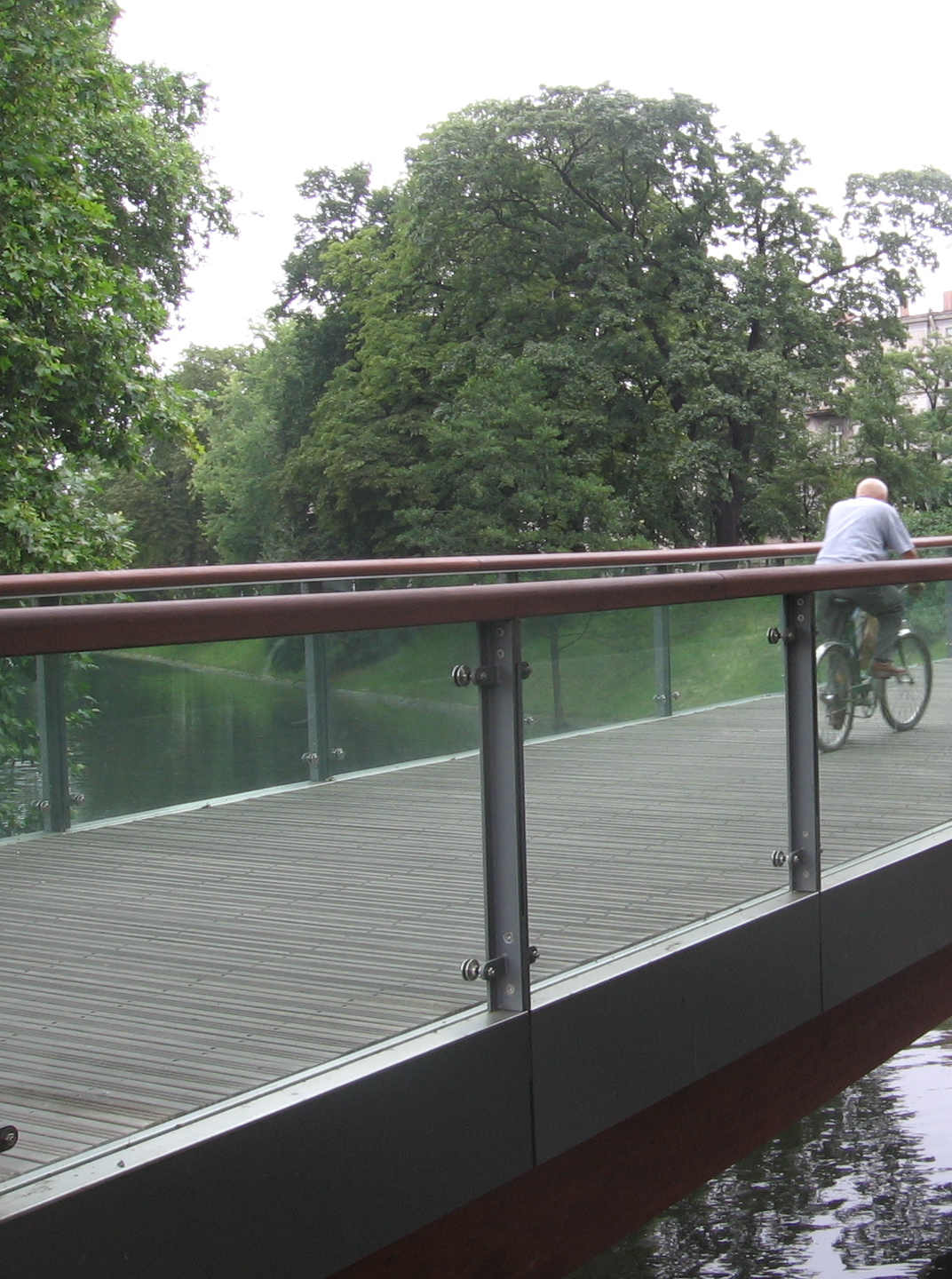
Lophira alata used as the pavement of wooden footbridge in Wrocław, Poland

The timber, known as azobe, is strong and resistant making it useful for demanding constructions outdoors. The timber also has better electrical properties than other wood making it possible to use it in poles for electric fences without separate isolators. The colour is reddish brown and the wood is abrasive, dulling tools rapidly.

Sniffing the bark is used as a traditional treatment for headache. The leaves of Lophira alata afforded two new biflavonoids, lophirone L (1) and lophirone M (2), and the known luteolin and lithospermoside. Both biflavonoids were obtained in small quantities, and their structures show some new and unusual biflavonoid diversity. Likewise, two chalcone tetramers were isolated as inhibitors of Epstein–Barr virus (EBV)-activation induced by a tumor promoter, teleocidin B-4, from Lophira alata. One of them was identified as lophirachalcone. The other, named alatachalcone, was new, and the structure was determined by spectral properties. Both compounds also showed potent inhibitory activities against teleocidin B-4-induced inflammation on mouse ear. In an initiation-promotion experiment on mouse skin, alatachalcone (16 nmol) significantly inhibited tumor promotion caused by 12-O-tetradecanoylphorbol-13-acetate (TPA, 1.6 nmol).
