= Froesia =

Scientific classification
- Kingdom: Plantae
- Clade: Tracheophytes
- Clade: Angiosperms
- Clade: Eudicots
- Clade: Rosids
- Order: Malpighiales
- Family: Ochnaceae
- Subfamily: Quiinoideae
- Genus: Froesia; Pires

Species of plant

Froesia is a genus of plants in family Ochnaceae. Some authors have placed it in the Quiinaceae. It is known from Brazil, Peru, Colombia, Guyana and Venezuela.

The following species are accepted by The Plant List:

- Froesia crassiflora Pires & Fróes
- Froesia diffusa Gereau & R.Vásquez
- Froesia gereauana J.V.Schneid. & Zizka
- Froesia tricarpa Pires
- Froesia venezuelensis Steyerm. & Bunting
