= Touroulia =

Scientific classification
- Kingdom: Plantae
- Clade: Tracheophytes
- Clade: Angiosperms
- Clade: Eudicots
- Clade: Rosids
- Order: Malpighiales
- Family: Ochnaceae
- Subfamily: Quiinoideae
- Genus: Touroulia; Aubl.

Genus of flowering plants

Touroulia is a genus of flowering plants belonging to the family Ochnaceae.

Its native range is Southern America.

Species:

- Touroulia amazonica Pires & A.S.Foster
- Touroulia guianensis Aubl.
