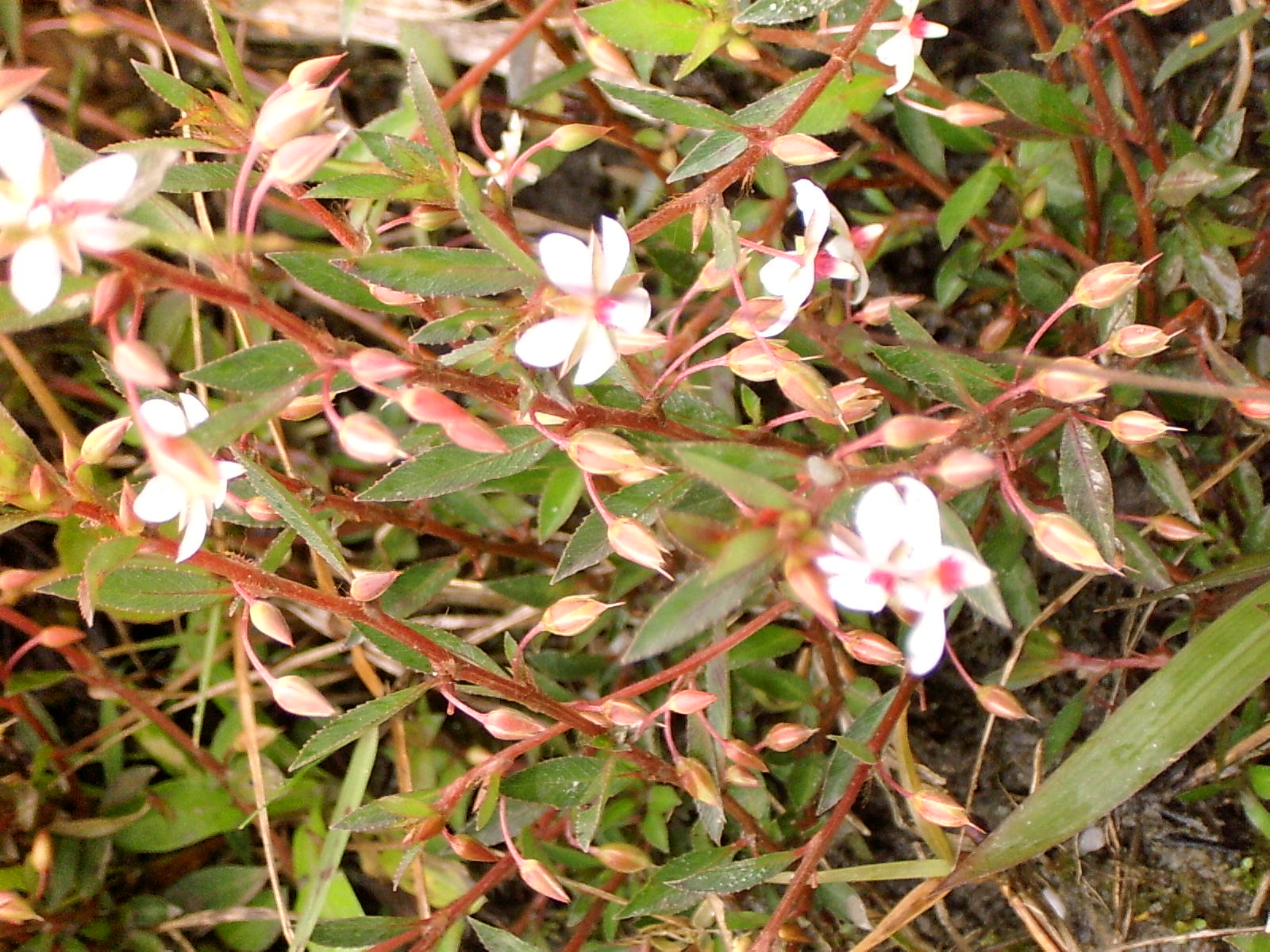
- Sauvagesia erecta from southern Brazil

Scientific classification
- Kingdom: Plantae
- Clade: Embryophytes
- Clade: Tracheophytes
- Clade: Angiosperms
- Clade: Eudicots
- Clade: Rosids
- Order: Malpighiales
- Family: Ochnaceae; DC.

Genera
- See text

= Ochnaceae =

Ochnaceae Temporal range: Late Paleocene - recent

Family of flowering plants

Ochnaceae is a family of flowering plants in the order Malpighiales. In the APG III system of classification of flowering plants, Ochnaceae is defined broadly, to include about 550 species, and encompasses what some taxonomists have treated as the separate families Medusagynaceae and Quiinaceae. In a phylogenetic study that was published in 2014, Ochnaceae was recognized in the broad sense, but two works published after APG III have accepted the small families Medusagynaceae and Quiinaceae. These have not been accepted by APG IV (2016).

In this article, "Ochnaceae" will refer to the larger circumscription of the family, which is otherwise known as Ochnaceae sensu lato or as the ochnoids. In this sense the family includes 32 genera with about 550 species.

Ochnaceae, defined broadly or narrowly, is pantropical in distribution, with a few species cultivated outside of this range. Ochnaceae is most diverse in the Neotropics, with a second center of diversity in tropical Africa. It consists mostly of shrubs and small trees, and, in Sauvagesia, a few herbaceous species. Many are treelets, with a single, erect trunk, but low in height. The Ochnaceae are notable for their unusual leaves. These are usually shiny, with closely spaced, parallel veins, toothed margins, and conspicuous stipules. Most of the species are buzz pollinated. In eight of the genera in tribe Sauvagesieae, the flower changes form after opening, by continued growth of tissue within the flower.

A few species of Ochna are cultivated as ornamentals. Ochna thomasiana is probably the most commonly planted, but it is often misidentified in the horticultural literature.

The leaves of Cespedesia are sometimes to 1 m (3.3 ft) in length and are used for roofing. An herbal tea is made from the pantropical weed Sauvagesia erecta.

In its evolution, Ochnaceae has been unusual, in "reverting" to character states that are regarded as ancestral or primitive. For example, an actinomorphic floral symmetry has appeared twice in the subfamily Ochnoideae. Also, two clades of Ochnaceae, one in Ochnoideae and another in Quiinoideae have a derived condition very close to apocarpy. The complete separation of the carpels (apocarpy) is thought to be the ancestral state for angiosperms.

Fossils attributed to Ochnaceae are known from the early Eocene of Mississippi. The age of the family is very roughly estimated at 100 million years.

A great many genus names have been published in Ochnaceae. In a taxonomic revision of Ochnaceae, as three families, in 2014, only 32 of these genera were accepted; one in Medusagynaceae, four in Quiinaceae, and 27 in Ochnaceae s.s. In that same year, a 33rd genus, Neckia, was reestablished in order to preserve the monophyly of another genus, Sauvagesia.

The largest genera in Ochnaceae are: Ouratea (200 species), Ochna (85), Campylospermum (65), Sauvagesia (39), and Quiina (34). None of the larger genera has been the subject of a phylogenetic analysis of DNA sequences of selected genes. In one study of the subfamily Quiinoideae, based on the trn L-F intergenic spacer, only nine species were sampled from this subfamily.

== Genera ==
The following list of 36 genera consists of Neckia, which was resurrected in 2014, Indovethia, Polythecanthum and Sinia, plus the 32 genera that were described in the most recent revision of Ochnaceae. The classification is from Schneider et alii (2014).

Medusagynoideae

- Medusagyne Baker 1877

Quiinoideae

clade

- Froesia Pires 1948

clade

- Lacunaria Ducke 1925
- Quiina Aubl. 1775
- Touroulia Aubl. 1775

Ochnoideae

Testuleeae

- Testulea Pellegr. 1924

Luxemburgieae

- Luxemburgia A.St.-Hil. 1822
- Philacra Dwyer 1944

Ochneae

Lophirinae
- Lophira Banks ex C.F.Gaertn. 1805
Elvasiinae
- Elvasia DC. 1811
- Perissocarpa Steyerm. & Maguire 1984
Ochninae
- Brackenridgea A.Gray 1853
- Campylospermum Tiegh. 1902
- Idertia Farron 1935
- Ochna L., 1758
- Ouratea Aubl. 1775
- Polythecanthum Tiegh. 1907
- Rhabdophyllum Tiegh. 1902

Sauvagesieae

- Adenarake Maguire & Wurdack 1961
- Blastemanthus Planch. 1846
- Cespedesia Goudot 1844
- Euthemis W.Jack 1820
- Fleurydora A.Chev. 1933
- Godoya Ruiz & Pav. 1794
- Indosinia J.E.Vidal 1965
- Indovethia Boerl. 1894
- Krukoviella A.C.Smith 1939
- Neckia Korth. 1848
- Poecilandra Tul. 1847
- Rhytidanthera Tiegh. 1904
- Sauvagesia L., 1758
- Schuurmansia Blume 1850
- Schuurmansiella Hallier f. 1913
- Sinia Diels 1930
- Tyleria Gleason 1931
- Wallacea Spruce ex Benth. & Hook.f. 1862

== Description ==
The following description is excerpted from the descriptions of Medusagynaceae, Quiinaceae, and Ochnaceae s.s. in The Families and Genera of Vascular Plants, with some information from other sources, as indicated.

Mostly shrubs and small trees, plus a few trees of moderate size, and in Sauvagesia, a few herbs.

Leaves simple, except pinnately compound in Krukoviella, and in Quiinoideae, often pinnately lobed or compound on juvenile plants. Pinnate leaves are typical of Rhytidanthera. The leaves are often coriaceous and conspicuously serrate. Stipules present, except Medusagyne.

Venation often scalariform (ladder-like) in appearance, with parallel and closely spaced secondary and tertiary veins. Petioles absent or short, sometimes resembling a pulvinus.

Unisexual flowers are common in Medusagyne and in Quiinoideae (except Froesia), but restricted to a clade of three genera in Ochnoideae. Unisexual flowers are found in Schuurmansia, Schuurmansiella, and Euthemis. The flowers are always unisexual in Schuurmansiella.

In polygamous species, flowers have been assessed as bisexual on the basis of morphology only. Pollen produced by apparently hermaphroditic flowers has, in a few cases, been found to be inaperturate, rendering the flower functionally female.

Sepals 3 to 5, often unequal, sometimes accrescent.

Petals 4 or 5, or rarely 3, 6, 7, or 8, often contort, free or fuzed at base only, sometimes reflexed over the sepals.

Fertile stamens 5 to 10 or numerous, rarely one. Filaments sometimes persistent, sometimes narrowed near the anthers.

Anthers basifixed or slightly dorsifixed, usually dehiscing by one or two apical or subapical pores, sometimes latrorsely by longitudinal slits. In Medusagyne and Quiinoideae, an enlarged septum separates the thecae.

Staminodes often present, free or connate, sometimes petaloid, sometimes enveloping the fertile stamens.

Nectar not produced. Flowers usually buzz-pollinated.

Ovary superior, longitudinally ribbed in Medusagyne and Quiinoideae; unribbed in Ochnoideae. Carpels completely fused or nearly separate; 2-15, or up to 25 in Medusagyne. Style apical or gynobasic.

Fruit sometimes winged; rarely a nut or drupe, often berry-like; usually a septicidal capsule, or else the ovary separating to form blackish drupelets on a usually reddish, accrescent receptacle.

Seeds albuminous or exalbuminous, winged or not. The seed coat often includes a layer of cristarque cells. These are sclereids, each containing calcium oxalate crystals in the form of a druse.

== Classification ==
Until near the end of the 20th century, Ochnaceae was regarded as a rather odd family, difficult to place with a high degree of certainty. Even into the 21st century, some authors treated the genus Strasburgeria as the closest relative of Ochnaceae, and some even placed it within the family. In the APG III system, Strasburgeria is grouped with Ixerba to form the family Strasburgeriaceae in the rosid order Crossosomatales.

More rarely, the genus Diegodendron was thought to be close to Strasburgeria and Ochnaceae. Molecular phylogenetic studies have strongly supported the inclusion of Diegodendron in the rosid order Malvales, and it is sometimes treated as a monospecific family therein. Otherwise, it has been placed in Bixaceae, though there is reason to suspect that it might be closer to Sphaerosepalaceae.

All of the genera mentioned above, as well as Ochnaceae, were long regarded as anamalous taxa of uncertain affinity. All had been placed, at one time or another, with Ochnaceae, near Theaceae, a family now included in the basal asterid order Ericales.

In 2012, an analysis of chloroplast DNA resolved Ochnaceae as sister to a group of five families known as the clusioids. This result had only weak bootstrap support. The clusioids were once regarded as a group of four families, but Clusiaceae was divided in 2009 and the name Calophyllaceae was resurrected for one of the resulting segregates.

There are only a few morphological characters that unite the clusioids with Ochnaceae. The petal aestivation is often contort in the clusioids, and usually so in Ochnaceae. In both groups, the flowers usually bear numerous stamens, and in the ovary, the placentation is mostly axile. In the ovules, the nucellus is often thin, and the outer integument is usually thicker than the inner.

== Taxonomy ==
Ochnaceae is divided into three subfamilies: Medusagynoideae, Quiinoideae, and Ochnoideae.

A molecular phylogenetic study resolved Medusagynoideae and Quiinoideae as sister subfamilies, but this result had only weak statistical support. In both subfamilies, the flowers are polystemonous. Except for the genus Froesia, many or all of the flowers are unisexual. The anthers contain a massive septum between the thecae that persists after anther dehiscence. The styles radiate outward from the ovary. At anthesis, the ovary is sculpted with longitudinal ribs.

Medusagynoideae consists of a single species, Medusagyne oppositifolia. It is endemic to the island of Mahé in the Seychelles.

Quiinoideae comprises about 48 species in four genera: Froesia, Quiina, Touroulia, and Lacunaria. It is restricted to tropical America. Froesia is distinct from the other three genera. Its flowers are always bisexual, and the fruit consists of three structures that resemble follicles, except that they are not quite entirely separate from each other.

The subfamily Ochnoideae was revised in 2014 as Ochnaceae sensu stricto. In that treatment, 27 genera were described. An additional genus, Neckia, was resurrected in that same year, based on the results of a molecular phylogenetic study. Amaral and Bittrich (2014) divided Ochnoideae into three tribes: Luxemburgieae, Sauvagesieae, and Ochneae. The genus Testulea was included in the tribe Sauvagesieae. No subtribes were recognized.

In 2014, a second reclassification of Ochnoideae was published, based on cladistic analysis of DNA sequences. In that paper, Schneider et alii divided Ochnoideae into four tribes: Testuleeae, Luxemburgieae, Sauvagesieae, and Ochneae. Their circumscription of the tribes was the same as that of Amaral and Bittrich (2014), except that Testulea was removed from Sauvagesieae into its own tribe, Testuleeae. Inclusion of Testulea in Sauvagesieae renders that tribe paraphyletic over Luxemburgieae.

Testulea consists of a single species, Testulea gabonensis, that is endemic to Gabon. It is unique in Ochnoideae in that its leaves have a brochidodromous pattern of venation and its flowers are tetramerous. In addition, only one of the stamens is fertile. The others are modified into staminodes and united into a column for up to ^{2}/_{3} of their length.

The tribe Luxemburgieae consists of two genera: Philacra and Luxemburgia. Philacra is native to Venezuela and northern Brazil. Luxemburgia is from Brazil.

The tribe Sauvagesieae is pantropical in distribution, and consists of 16 genera, most of them small. The largest, by far, is Sauvagesia, with 38 species, 35 of which are restricted to the neotropics. Sauvagesia is heterogeneous, and might be paraphyletic, even with Neckia removed from it. Relationships in the tribe Sauvagesieae are not well understood, and for this reason, it has not been divided into subtribes.

The tribe Ochneae is found in most of the tropics, but is most abundant in Africa and tropical America. It is distinguished from the rest of Ochnoideae by the absorption of the endosperm before the seed reaches maturity. Its nine genera belong to three subtribes: Lophirinae, Elvasiinae, and Ochninae.

The subtribe Lophirinae consists of a single genus, Lophira. It has two species, both confined to tropical Africa. It produces an unusual fruit, in which two of the sepals become greatly enlarged and form wings that facilitate seed distribution by wind.

The subtribe Elvasiinae consists of two genera, Perissocarpa and Elvasia, both confined to the American tropics. Perissocarpa has never been sampled for a molecular phylogenetic study.

The subtribe Ochninae consists of six genera: Campylospermum, Ouratea, Idertia, Brackenridgea, Rhabdophyllum, and Ochna. The largest of these, Ouratea, is confined to the New World and contains all of the New World species in Ochninae. All of the genera in Ochneae appear to be monophyletic, as defined by Amaral and Bittrich (2014), but in one molecular phylogenetic study, Ouratea and Ochna received only weak bootstrap support in the maximum likelihood analysis. Idertia and Brackenridgea are probably sister genera, but no other relationships have been resolved among the genera of Ochninae.

== Phylogeny ==
The phylogenetic tree below is adapted from the one that was published in 2014. Weakly supported nodes are collapsed to form polytomies. Maximum likelihood bootstrap support is > 75%, except where indicated. Perissocarpa and Indosinia have not been sampled for DNA. Their placement on the phylogenetic tree is based on anatomy and morphology only.

- Ochnaceae
  - 73
    - Medusagyne
    - - Froesia
      - - Quiina
        - - Lacunaria
          - Touroulia
  - - Testuleeae
      Testulea
    - - Luxemburgieae
        - Luxemburgia
        - Philacra
      - - Ochneae
          - Lophirinae
            Lophira
          - - Elvasiinae
              - Elvasia
              - Perissocarpa
            - Ochninae
              - Campylospermum
              - <50
                Ochna
              - 66
                Ouratea
              - Rhabdophyllum
              - - Brackenridgea
                - Idertia
        - Sauvagesieae
          - Blastemanthus
          - - Godoya
            - Rhytidanthera
            - - Cespedesia
              - Krukoviella
          - 67
            - Fleurydora
            - - - Poecilandra
                - Wallacea
              - - Neckia
                - 68
                  - 73
                    - Schuurmansia
                    - 69
                      - 56
                        Euthemis
                      - Schuurmansiella
                  - - Tyleria
                    - - Adenarake
                      - Indosinia
                      - Sauvagesia

== Evolution ==
The evolution of Ochnaceae has been unusual in that it has included two complete reversions to an actinomorphic floral symmetry and two nearly complete reversions to apocarpy, a condition in which the carpels are entirely separate. Actinomorphy and apocarpy are believed to be "primitive" character states in angiosperms. Secondary apocarpy is especially rare and has arisen most notably in Rosaceae, Apocynaceae, Sapindales, and Malvales.

The flowers are actinomorphic in Medusagyne and Quiinoideae, but in Ochnoideae, zygomorphy is the ancestral condition. In Testulea, Philacra, and Luxemburgia, the flowers develop zygomorphically in the bud. But in the four basal clades of Sauvagesieae, comprising the genera Blastemanthus, Godoya, Rhytidanthera, Krukoviella, Cespedesia, Fleurydora, Poecilandra, and Wallacea, the flowers develop actinomorphically in the bud, then become zygomorphic after opening by growth of certain parts of the flower. Such late zygomorphy is very rare in flowering plants. In the remaining, fifth clade of Sauvagesieae, comprising the genera Neckia, Schuurmansia, Schuurmansiella, Euthemis, Tyleria, Adenarake, Indosinia, and Sauvagesia, the flowers remain actinomorphic after anthesis. In the tribe Ochneae, all of the species have actinomorphic flowers.

In the subtribe Ochninae, and in the genus Froesia, the components of the ovary (carpels) are very shortly united at the base. Otherwise, the ovary in Ochnaceae is syncarpous, consisting of carpels that are completely fuzed.

In Medusagyne and Quiinoideae, many of the flowers are unisexual, except in Froesia, where they are strictly hermaphrodite. In Ochnoideae, unisexual flowers are limited to a clade consisting of Schuurmansia, Schuurmansiella, and Euthemis.

In Medusagyne and Quiinoideae, as in most angiosperms, the anthers open by longitudinal slits. In Ochnoideeae, the anther dehiscence is ancestrally poricidal, with several reversions to longitudinal slits. Testulea, Philacra, and Luxemburgia have anthers that open by apical pores. So do the three most basal clades of Sauvagesieae, namely Blastemanthus, Fleurydora, and a clade of four genera that have five carpels and many ovules per carpel (Godoya, Rhytidanthera, Krukoviella, and Cespedesia). Poecilandra has poricidal anther dehiscence, but in its sister genus, Wallacea, the anthers open by longitudinal slits.

In the rest of Sauvagesieae, anther dehiscence is various. In Schuurmansia, Schuurmansiella, and Adenarake, the anther dehiscence is apically longicidal. This means that the longitudinal slit is short, and does not extend far from the apical end of the anther. In some species of Sauvagesia, the anthers split lengthwise, but the entire androecium is wrapped in petaloid staminodes, so that the pollen can escape from only the apex of the anther. This is known as a poricidal system because it functions as if the anthers were truly poricidal.

In the tribe Ochneae, anther dehiscence by longitudinal slits is restricted to Brackenridgea and a few species of Ochna.

Testulea is peculiar in having only one fertile stamen. Its anther opens by an apical pore. The other stamens are modified into sterile staminodes that are fuzed into a column for up to ^{2}/_{3} of their length.

In the genera Froesia and Quiina, and in the tribe Ochneae, the endosperm is completely absorbed early in seed development. It is not clear whether the presence or absence of endosperm is the ancestral state in Ochnaceae. For a long time, the subfamily Ochnoideae was divided into two groups based on this character alone. In such a classification, the group containing endosperm would be paraphyletic over Ochneae because it would contain Testulea, Philacra, and Luxemburgia.

The number of ovules per carpel varies widely in Ochnaceae. Medusagyne and Quiinoideae have two ovules per carpel. In Testulea and in a clade of four genera in Sauvagesieae (Godoya, Rhytidanthera, Krukoviella, and Cespedesia), the number of ovules is 100 to 200 per carpel. For the remainder of Sauvagesieae, except Euthemis, and for Philacra and Luxemburgia, the number of ovules per carpel ranges from four to 50. Euthemis has two ovules per carpel.

In Ochneae, Lophira has 4 to 50 ovules per carpel. In the subtribes Elvasiinae and Ochninae, the number of ovules per carpel is one.

== History ==
The family Ochnaceae was erected by Augustin Pyramus de Candolle in 1811. At that time, he described Elvasia, a new genus in the family, and he included three others: Ochna, Walkera, and Gomphia. Walkera was described by Johann Christian Daniel von Schreber in 1789, but is no longer recognized. Its type species was described as Gomphia serrata by Andrias Kanis in 1968, but it is now placed in the genus Campylospermum. Gomphia has long been a source of confusion and it was not recognized in the most recent revision of Ochnaceae.

Godoya and Sauvagesia were known in 1811, when de Candolle erected the family Ochnaceae, but he placed them in other families. In his Prodromus, he placed Godoya in the family that would later be known as Clusiaceae. He regarded Lauradia (Lavradia) as separate from Sauvagesia, and placed both of them in Violaceae. He added the genus Castela to Ochnaceae, but it is now part of Simaroubaceae. De Candolle believed that Simaroubaceae was closely related to Ochnaceae, but it is now placed in the order Sapindales. A few authors placed Godoya, Sauvagesia, and others in the family Sauvagesiaceae, until the beginning of the 21st century. Other authors, such as Adolf Engler, included them in Ochnaceae.

In 1874, Engler divided Ochnaceae into two groups, based on the absence or presence of endosperm in the mature seed. The group without endosperm corresponds to de Candolle's concept of Ochnaceae, and to the modern tribe Ochneae. The group with endosperm is now known to be paraphyletic and consists of the tribes Testuleeae, Luxemburgieae, and Sauvagesieae. In 1876, in a flora of Brazil, Engler described many new species in Ochnaceae, especially in its largest genus, Ouratea. He described 85 species in Ouratea, 17 of which he named as new species at that time. He also transferred 63 species to Ouratea from other genera.

The genera Quiina and Touroulia had been known since 1775, when they were described by Jean Baptiste Aublet, and they were variously classified by 19th century taxonomists. Jacques Denys Choisy erected the family Quiinaceae (as Quiinacées) for them in 1849, but he did not meet the requirements for valid publication of a botanical name. The name Quiinaceae was validated by Engler in Flora Brasiliensis in 1888.

The genus Medusagyne had been described by John Gilbert Baker in 1877, in a flora of Mauritius and the Seychelles, but it was not until 1924 that it was segregated into its own monogeneric family.

In 1893, Ernest Friedrich Gilg covered Ochnaceae, and Adolf Engler covered Quiinaceae for the first edition of Die Natürlichen Pflanzenfamilien. Engler wrote a description of Medusagyne in a supplement to the first edition of DNP in 1897. He placed Medusagyne under the heading "Zweifelhafte, möglicherweise zu den Guttiferae gehörige Gattung" (Doubtful, possibly a genus belonging to Guttiferae). Guttiferae is an obsolete name for Clusiaceae.

In 1902, Philippe van Tieghem recognized six families in what is now the subfamily Ochnoideae. These were Luxemburgiaceae, Sauvagesiaceae, Wallaceaceae, Euthemidaceae, Lophiraceae, and Ochnaceae. Three of these, (Wallaceaceae, Euthemidaceae, and Lophiraceae) were monogeneric and were erected by van Tieghem at that time. His Luxemburgiaceae included the basal clades of what is now the tribe Sauvagesieae. Van Tieghem named a great many genera in 1902, circumscribing them very narrowly. In what is now the subtribe Ochninae, he delineated 53 genera. The most recent revision of that group divides it into six genera.

In 1925, for the second edition of DNP, Engler and Gilg expanded on their treatment of Quiinaceae and Ochnaceae, respectively, compared to what they had written in 1893. Medusagynaceae was covered in the same volume of DNP by Adolf Engler and Hans Melchior.

For the second edition of DNP, Engler recognized two genera, Quiina and Touroulia, in Quiinaceae. Lacunaria and Froesia were discovered later and named in 1925 and 1948, respectively.

In that same volume, Gilg divided his Ochnaceae (equivalent to modern Ochnoideae) into 21 genera, including Indovethia, Leitgebia, Vausagesia, and Lauradia (as Lavradia), which are now regarded as synonyms of Sauvagesia. Eight of the modern genera, (Philacra, Krukoviella, Fleurydora, Tyleria, Adenarake, Indosinia, Perissocarpa, and Idertia) consist of plants that had not been uncovered by botanical exploration at that time. Gilg placed Rhytidanthera in synonymy under Godoya, but Rhytidanthera is accepted today. He included Campylospermum and Rhabdophyllum in Gomphia and placed Gomphia in synonymy under Ouratea. In his revision of Ochnaceae, Gilg provided a summary of van Tieghem's classification, as well as his own. Three of van Tieghem's genera, (Campylospermum, Rhabdophyllum, and Rhytidanthera) are still recognized today.

In 1968, Andrias Kanis published a paper that greatly influenced subsequent work in Ochnaceae, right up to the 2014 revision. Claude H.L. Sastre named many new species in Ochnaceae, in several papers from 1970 to 2003.

In 1991, a cladistic analysis was published for Ochnaceae. In that same year, Neckia, a 28th genus for Ochnoideae, was resurrected in a molecular phylogenetic study based on four chloroplast DNA loci, and nuclear ribosomal ITS. Seventy-nine species of Ochnaceae were sampled and a new classification was presented. Also, Testulea was removed from the tribe Sauvagesieae, and placed in the monotypic tribe Testuleeae.
