= Testulea =

Conservation status
- Endangered (IUCN 2.3)

Scientific classification
- Kingdom: Plantae
- Clade: Tracheophytes
- Clade: Angiosperms
- Clade: Eudicots
- Clade: Rosids
- Order: Malpighiales
- Family: Ochnaceae
- Subfamily: Ochnoideae
- Tribe: Testuleeae; J.V.Schneid.
- Genus: Testulea; Pellegr.
- Species: T. gabonensis

Binomial name
- Testulea gabonensis Pellegr.

Genus of plants

Testulea is a monotypic genus of plants in the family Ochnaceae. It contains only one species, Testulea gabonensis, an endangered species native to Central Africa.

== Distribution and habitat ==
Testulea gabonensis is native to Cameroon, Equatorial Guinea, Gabon, and the Republic of the Congo, where it grows in primary rainforests. It is usually scattered at low densities throughout its habitat and prefers humid, well-drained locations.

== Description ==
Testulea gabonensis is a medium to large tree growing up to 50 m (160 ft) tall. The trunk is typically straight and cylindrical, growing up to 120 cm (47 in) in diameter, with steep buttresses up to 3 m (9.8 ft) high. The yellowish-grey or yellowish-brown bark is scaly and falls away in small patches. The leaves are oblanceolate in shape, measuring 20–35 cm (7.9–13.8 in) long and 4–8 cm (1.6–3.1 in) wide. The tip of the leaf is short and pointed, and the edges are slight wavy. The leaves are arranged spirally, clustering near the tips of the branches. The inflorescence is a false raceme that grows up to 35 cm (14 in) long, with flowers arranged in groups of three or four. The bisexual flowers are zygomorphic and tetramerous. The flowers may be yellowish-white to pink in colour and are borne on pedicels measuring approximately 1.5 cm (0.59 in) long. The petals and sepals are of unequal sizes, with the petals ranging from 1 cm (0.39 in) to 1.5 cm (0.59 in) long. Several staminodes are fused to form a long tube. The fruit is a rounded, flattened capsule measuring 3–6 cm (1.2–2.4 in) in diameter with a notch at the top. The seeds are cylindrical, measuring around 1 cm (0.39 in) long, with a papery wing that measures around 1.5 cm (0.59 in) long.

== Ecology ==
Testulea gabonensis typically flowers from December to April, with the seeds dispersed by wind. Grey parrots are known to feed on the seeds.

== Uses ==
The wood of Testulea gabonensis is durable and may be used as a substitute for teak. It is traded on the international timber market under the name izombé, and used for boat-building, construction, furniture, mine props, sporting equipment, sculpting, and turnery. The bark is used in traditional medicine.

== Conservation status ==
Testulea gabonensis is listed as endangered on the International Union for Conservation of Nature's Red List under criterion A1cd, based on its declining population and continued exploitation for timber. It is overexploited in much of its range, and is vulnerable due to its small distribution and low density.
