= List of Ouratea species =

As of April 2023, Plants of the World Online accepted about 290 species in the genus Ouratea:

- Ouratea acicularis R.G.Chacon & K.Yamam.
- Ouratea acuminata (DC.) Engl.
- Ouratea × acunae Borhidi
- Ouratea acuta (Tiegh.) Sastre
- Ouratea agrophylla (Tiegh.) Urb.
- Ouratea amplifolia Sleumer
- Ouratea angustissima Sastre & Offroy
- Ouratea apurensis Sastre
- Ouratea aquatica (Kunth) Engl.
- Ouratea arbobrevicalyx Sastre
- Ouratea aromatica J.F.Macbr.
- Ouratea articulata Sastre
- Ouratea asisae Maguire & Steyerm.
- Ouratea attenuata Tiegh.
- Ouratea australis Ule
- Ouratea bahiensis Sastre
- Ouratea barrae (Tiegh.) Lasser
- Ouratea batesii De Wild.
- Ouratea bipartita Sastre
- Ouratea blanchetiana (Planch.) Engl.
- Ouratea boliviana Tiegh.
- Ouratea brevicalyx Maguire & Steyerm.
- Ouratea brevipedicellata Maguire & Steyerm.
- Ouratea brevipes (Tiegh.) Sastre
- Ouratea campos-portoi Sleumer
- Ouratea candelabra Sastre
- Ouratea candollei (Planch.) Tiegh.
- Ouratea caracasana (Planch.) Engl.
- Ouratea cardiosperma (Lam.) Engl.
- Ouratea cassinifolia (DC.) Engl.
- Ouratea castaneifolia (DC.) Engl.
- Ouratea cataniapoensis Aymard
- Ouratea cataractarum Sandwith
- Ouratea caudata Engl.
- Ouratea cauliflora Fraga & Saavedra
- Ouratea cearensis (Tiegh.) Sastre & Offroy
- Ouratea cerebroidea Sastre
- Ouratea cernuiflora Sandwith
- Ouratea chaffanjonii (Tiegh.) Sastre
- Ouratea chiribiquetensis Sastre
- Ouratea chocoensis Sastre
- Ouratea chrysopetala Ule
- Ouratea cidiana Sastre
- Ouratea cinerea (Tiegh.) Urb.
- Ouratea cinnamomea Wawra
- Ouratea clarkii Sastre
- Ouratea claudei Salvador, E.P.Santos & Cervi
- Ouratea coccinea Engl.
- Ouratea conduplicata Engl.
- Ouratea confertiflora (Pohl) Engl.
- Ouratea crassa Tiegh.
- Ouratea crassifolia (Pohl) Engl.
- Ouratea crassinervia Engl.
- Ouratea croizatii Maguire & Steyerm.
- Ouratea culminicola Maguire & Steyerm.
- Ouratea curvata (A.St.-Hil.) Engl. ex Dwyer
- Ouratea cuspidata (A.St.-Hil.) Engl.
- Ouratea darienensis Whitef.
- Ouratea davidsei Sastre
- Ouratea decagyna Maguire
- Ouratea deminuta Maguire & Steyerm.
- Ouratea discophora Ducke
- Ouratea disticha Tiegh.
- Ouratea dorata L.Marinho & Amorim
- Ouratea duckei Huber
- Ouratea duidae Steyerm.
- Ouratea elegans Urb.
- Ouratea elliptica (A.Rich.) M.Gómez
- Ouratea engleri Tiegh.
- Ouratea erecta Sastre
- Ouratea evoluta Maguire & Steyerm.
- Ouratea fasciculata Maguire & Steyerm.
- Ouratea ferruginea Engl.
- Ouratea fieldingiana (Gardner) Engl.
- Ouratea flexipedicellata Dwyer
- Ouratea flexuosa Rusby
- Ouratea floribunda (A.St.-Hil.) Engl.
- Ouratea francineae Sastre
- Ouratea fusiformis Sastre
- Ouratea garcinioides Ule
- Ouratea gardneri (Tiegh.) Sastre & Offroy
- Ouratea gigantophylla (Erhard) Engl.
- Ouratea gillyana (Dwyer) Sandwith & Maguire
- Ouratea glaucescens (A.St.-Hil.) Engl.
- Ouratea glazioviana (Tiegh.) Sastre & Offroy
- Ouratea globosa Engl.
- Ouratea glomerata (Pohl) Sastre & Offroy
- Ouratea gonzalezii Sastre
- Ouratea gracilis D.B.O.S.Cardoso & L.Marinho
- Ouratea grandiflora (DC.) Engl.
- Ouratea grandifolia (Planch.) Engl.
- Ouratea grosourdyi (Tiegh.) Steyerm.
- Ouratea guaiquinimensis Sastre
- Ouratea guianensis Aubl.
- Ouratea guildingii (Planch.) Urb.
- Ouratea guriensis Sastre
- Ouratea hassleriana Chodat
- Ouratea hatschbachii K.Yamam.
- Ouratea hemiodonta (Tiegh.) Sastre & Offroy
- Ouratea heterobracteata Sastre
- Ouratea hexasperma (A.St.-Hil.) Baill.
- Ouratea hilaireana Tiegh.
- Ouratea hoehnei Sleumer
- Ouratea huberi Maguire & Steyerm.
- Ouratea humilis (A.St.-Hil.) Engl.
- Ouratea ilicifolia (DC.) Baill.
- Ouratea impressa (Tiegh.) Lemée
- Ouratea insulae L.Riley
- Ouratea inundata Engl.
- Ouratea iquitosensis J.F.Macbr.
- Ouratea jaliscensis McVaugh
- Ouratea jamaicensis (Planch.) Urb.
- Ouratea jansen-jacobsiae Sastre
- Ouratea javariensis Sastre
- Ouratea jefensis Whitef.
- Ouratea jurgensenii (Planch.) Engl.
- Ouratea kananariensis Sastre
- Ouratea kanukuensis Sastre
- Ouratea knappiae Whitef.
- Ouratea lajaensis Sastre
- Ouratea lanceolata (Pohl) Engl.
- Ouratea lancifolia R.G.Chacon & K.Yamam.
- Ouratea larae Sastre
- Ouratea latifolia (Erhard) Tiegh.
- Ouratea laurifolia (Sw.) Engl.
- Ouratea leblondii (Tiegh.) Lemée
- Ouratea leprieuri Tiegh.
- Ouratea lessonii Tiegh.
- Ouratea liesneri Sastre
- Ouratea linearis (A.Gray) Sastre & Offroy
- Ouratea litoralis Urb.
- Ouratea longifolia (Lam.) Engl.
- Ouratea longistyla Maguire & Steyerm.
- Ouratea lucens (Kunth) Engl.
- Ouratea luschnathiana (Tiegh.) K.Yamam. ex Sastre & Offroy
- Ouratea maasiorum Sastre
- Ouratea macrocarpa Sastre
- Ouratea madrensis L.Riley
- Ouratea magdalenae (Triana & Planch.) Engl.
- Ouratea maguirei Sastre
- Ouratea maigualidae Sastre
- Ouratea marahuacensis Maguire & Steyerm.
- Ouratea margaretae Sastre
- Ouratea mazaruniensis A.C.Sm. & Dwyer
- Ouratea medinae Maguire & Steyerm.
- Ouratea megaphylla Sastre
- Ouratea melinonii (Tiegh.) Lemée
- Ouratea membranacea (Triana & Planch.) Engl.
- Ouratea mexicana (Bonpl.) Engl.
- Ouratea microdonta (Benth.) Engl.
- Ouratea miersii (Planch.) Engl.
- Ouratea miniguianensis Sastre
- Ouratea multibracteata Steyerm. ex Sastre
- Ouratea multiflora (Pohl) Engl.
- Ouratea nana (A.St.-Hil.) Engl.
- Ouratea neoweddelliana Sastre & Offroy
- Ouratea nervosa (A.St.-Hil.) Engl.
- Ouratea nervulina Cuatrec.
- Ouratea neuridesii I.Castañeda
- Ouratea nitida (Sw.) Engl.
- Ouratea oblita L.Riley
- Ouratea oblongifolia Rusby
- Ouratea obovata Sastre
- Ouratea occultinervis Sastre
- Ouratea oleifolia (A.St.-Hil.) Engl.
- Ouratea oleosa J.F.Macbr.
- Ouratea oligantha Steyerm. ex Sastre
- Ouratea oliviformis Engl.
- Ouratea opaca Engl.
- Ouratea orbignyana (Tiegh.) Liesner
- Ouratea orgyalis S.Moore
- Ouratea orisina Sastre
- Ouratea ornata Maguire & Steyerm.
- Ouratea osaensis Whitef.
- Ouratea ovalis (Pohl) Engl.
- Ouratea palatinatensis Sastre & Offroy
- Ouratea papillata Maguire & Steyerm.
- Ouratea papulosa Sastre
- Ouratea paraguayensis Hassl. ex Sastre & Offroy
- Ouratea paratatei Sastre
- Ouratea paruensis Maguire & Steyerm.
- Ouratea parviflora (DC.) Baill.
- Ouratea parvifolia (A.St.-Hil.) Engl.
- Ouratea pastazana Sastre & Offroy
- Ouratea patelliformis Dwyer
- Ouratea patens Engl.
- Ouratea pendula Poepp. ex Engl.
- Ouratea pendulosepala Sastre
- Ouratea phaeophylla Sleumer
- Ouratea pilgeri Tiegh.
- Ouratea pilinervosa Sastre & Offroy
- Ouratea pintoi Sastre
- Ouratea pisiformis Engl.
- Ouratea plana Tiegh.
- Ouratea platicaulis Sastre
- Ouratea poeppigii Tiegh.
- Ouratea polita (C.Presl) Engl.
- Ouratea polyantha (Triana & Planch.) Engl.
- Ouratea polygyna Engl.
- Ouratea prominens Dwyer
- Ouratea pseudogigantophylla Sastre
- Ouratea pseudoguildingii Sastre
- Ouratea pseudomarahuacensis Sastre
- Ouratea pseudotatei Maguire & Steyerm.
- Ouratea ptaritepuiensis Steyerm.
- Ouratea pulchella (Planch.) Engl.
- Ouratea pulchrifolia Ducke
- Ouratea pulverulenta Sastre
- Ouratea purdieana Tiegh.
- Ouratea purpuripes S.Moore
- Ouratea pycnanthos Sastre & Offroy
- Ouratea pycnostachys (Mart. ex Erhard) Engl.
- Ouratea pygmaea (Tiegh.) Sastre & Offroy
- Ouratea pyrifera Cuatrec.
- Ouratea racemiformis Ule
- Ouratea ramifera Tiegh.
- Ouratea ramiflora Sastre
- Ouratea ramosissima Maguire & Steyerm.
- Ouratea repens (Tiegh.) Sastre & Offroy
- Ouratea retrorsa Sastre
- Ouratea revoluta (C.Wright ex Griseb.) Engl.
- Ouratea riedeliana Engl.
- Ouratea rigida Engl.
- Ouratea rinconensis Whitef.
- Ouratea riparia Sleumer
- Ouratea robusta F.O.Silva & M.R.V.Barbosa
- Ouratea roraimae Engl.
- Ouratea rorida Sastre
- Ouratea rosipes S.Moore
- Ouratea rotundifolia (Fielding & Gardner) Engl.
- Ouratea rotundipetala Maguire & Steyerm.
- Ouratea rubescens Tiegh.
- Ouratea rubricyanea Cuatrec.
- Ouratea rupununiensis Engl.
- Ouratea saldariagae Sastre
- Ouratea salicifolia (A.St.-Hil. & Tul.) Engl.
- Ouratea saulensis Sastre
- Ouratea savannarum Britton & P.Wilson
- Ouratea scandens Ule
- Ouratea schizostyla Berazaín
- Ouratea schomburgkii (Planch.) Engl.
- Ouratea scottii Sastre
- Ouratea sculpta (Tiegh.) Sastre
- Ouratea sellowii (Planch.) Engl.
- Ouratea semiserrata (Mart. & Nees) Engl.
- Ouratea septentrionalis Sleumer
- Ouratea simulans S.Moore
- Ouratea sipaliwiniensis Sastre
- Ouratea sipapoensis Maguire & Steyerm.
- Ouratea soderstromii Sastre
- Ouratea spectabilis Engl.
- Ouratea spruceana Engl.
- Ouratea squamata Sastre
- Ouratea stenobasis Whitef.
- Ouratea stenophylla Gilg
- Ouratea steyermarkii Sastre
- Ouratea stipulata (Vell.) Tiegh.
- Ouratea striata (Tiegh.) Urb.
- Ouratea suaveolens (A.St.-Hil.) Engl.
- Ouratea subamplexicaulis Maguire & Steyerm.
- Ouratea subcaudata Sleumer
- Ouratea subscandens (Planch.) Engl.
- Ouratea subvelutina (Planch.) Sastre & Offroy
- Ouratea sulcatinervia Whitef.
- Ouratea superba Engl.
- Ouratea superimpressa Sastre
- Ouratea takutuensis Sastre
- Ouratea tarapotensis J.F.Macbr.
- Ouratea tatei Gleason
- Ouratea tenuifolia Engl.
- Ouratea terminalis (Vell.) Tiegh.
- Ouratea theophrasta (Planch.) Baill.
- Ouratea thyrsoidea Engl.
- Ouratea timehriensis Sastre
- Ouratea tristis Whitef.
- Ouratea trollii Sleumer
- Ouratea tumacoensis Sastre
- Ouratea vaccinioides (A.St.-Hil. & Tul.) Engl.
- Ouratea valerii Standl.
- Ouratea vellozoi (Tiegh.) Sastre & Offroy
- Ouratea venulata (Tiegh.) Sastre
- Ouratea verruculosa Engl.
- Ouratea verticillata (Vell.) Engl.
- Ouratea vieirae Sastre
- Ouratea vulgaris (Vell.) Tiegh.
- Ouratea wallnoeferiana Sastre
- Ouratea weberbaueri Sleumer
- Ouratea werdermannii Sleumer
- Ouratea williamsii J.F.Macbr.
- Ouratea xerophila Rizzini
- Ouratea xolismifolia Britton & P.Wilson
- Ouratea yamamotoana Fraga, G.H.Shimizu & D.B.O.S.Cardoso
- Ouratea yapacana Sastre
