= Acrometopia conspicua =

Scientific classification
- Kingdom: Animalia
- Phylum: Arthropoda
- Class: Insecta
- Order: Diptera
- Family: Chamaemyiidae
- Subfamily: Chamaemyiinae
- Tribe: Chamaemyiini
- Genus: Acrometopia
- Species: A. conspicua

Binomial name
- Acrometopia conspicua Papp, 2005
- Acrometopia conspicua is known from Hehuanshan in the Central Mountain Range of Taiwan

Species of fly

Acrometopia conspicua is a species of fly in the family Chamaemyiidae. It is found in Taiwan and is the only known representative of its genus there. The specific name conspicua refers to the conspicuousness of this fly, including the colorful head that makes this species easily recognizable.

== Taxonomy ==
The type series was collected from Hehuanshan (Mount Hehuan, also romanized as Hohuanshan) in Nantou County in July 1990. The types were found in the unsorted material of the Taichung Museum and subsequently described as a new species in 2005 by László Papp.

== Habitat ==
The types were collected with sweeping net. No other ecological information is available.

== Description ==
Body length varies between 2.8 and 3.3 mm (0.110 and 0.130 in). The wings are light greyish (apart from the subcostal cell that is brown (basally) to almost black) with brown veins and measure between 2.65–2.85 mm (0.104–0.112 in) in length and 0.98–1.07 mm (0.039–0.042 in) in width. The squamal fringe is black. The head is colorful, including frons that is orange. The face is orange dorsally and grey ventrally. The body coloration is silvery greyish, with abdominal setae originating from large round black spots. The femora are grey with yellowish basal and apical parts, the tibiae are mainly yellow, and the fore tarsi are all dark.
