= O. elegans =

O. elegans may refer to:

- Ochthiphila elegans, a synonym for Chamaemyia elegans a fly found in Europe
- Okenia elegans, a sea slug
- Omobranchus elegans, a combtooth blenny found in the Northwest Pacific Ocean
- Ophisops elegans, the snake-eyed lizard, a lizard found in the Mediterranean region and Central Asia
- Orestias elegans (fish), a species of fish
- Orestias elegans (plant), a species of orchids
- Orthonevra elegans, a hoverfly found in Europe and Asia
- Ouratea elegans, a plant endemic to Jamaica
- Oxyloma elegans, a small land snail found in Europe
