= Chamaemyia taiwanensis =

Scientific classification
- Kingdom: Animalia
- Phylum: Arthropoda
- Class: Insecta
- Order: Diptera
- Family: Chamaemyiidae
- Subfamily: Chamaemyiinae
- Tribe: Chamaemyiini
- Genus: Chamaemyia
- Species: C. taiwanensis

Binomial name
- Chamaemyia taiwanensis Papp, 2005
- Chamaemyia taiwanensis is known from Hehuanshan in the Central Mountain Range of Taiwan

Species of fly

Chamaemyia taiwanensis is a species of fly in the family Chamaemyiidae. It is found in Taiwan and is the only known representative of its genus there.

== Taxonomy ==
The type series was collected from Hehuanshan (Mount Hehuan, also romanized as Hohuanshan) in Nantou County in July 1990 and September 1999. The types were found in the unsorted material of the Taichung Museum and subsequently described as a new species in 2005 by László Papp.

== Habitat ==
The altitude given for one of the paratypes is 3,100 m (10,200 ft) above sea level. Most of the types were collected with sweeping net.

== Description ==
Body length varies between 2.55 and 2.8 mm (0.100 and 0.110 in). The wings are clear with brown veins and measure between 2.5–2.7 mm (0.098–0.106 in) in length and 1.05–1.17 mm (0.041–0.046 in) in width. The halteres are whitish yellow. The antennae, arista, and tibiae are black; the first flagellomere of the antennae can seldom be very narrowly dirty yellow. The abdomen has large black spots. The clypeus is narrow and black, while the proboscis is yellow.
