= Pseudodinia polita =

Scientific classification
- Domain: Eukaryota
- Kingdom: Animalia
- Phylum: Arthropoda
- Class: Insecta
- Order: Diptera
- Family: Chamaemyiidae
- Genus: Pseudodinia
- Species: P. polita

Binomial name
- Pseudodinia polita Malloch, 1915

Species of fly

Pseudodinia polita is a species of fly in the family Chamaemyiidae.
