= Poecilosomella curvipes =

Scientific classification
- Kingdom: Animalia
- Phylum: Arthropoda
- Class: Insecta
- Order: Diptera
- Family: Sphaeroceridae
- Genus: Poecilosomella
- Species: P. curvipes

Binomial name
- Poecilosomella curvipes Papp, 2002

Species of fly

Poecilosomella curvipes is a distinctive species of flies belonging to the family Sphaeroceridae. It is only known from Taiwan.

This fly can reach a total length of over 3 mm which is large compared to most of its congeners. The body is generally dark brown. The legs are noticeably thickened and curved with very long hairs on the forelegs. As with most members of the genus the legs are marked with light-coloured rings. The wings are light brown with yellow veins with some darker spots.
