= Chamaemyia nigripalpis =

Scientific classification
- Kingdom: Animalia
- Phylum: Arthropoda
- Class: Insecta
- Order: Diptera
- Family: Chamaemyiidae
- Subfamily: Chamaemyiinae
- Tribe: Chamaemyiini
- Genus: Chamaemyia
- Species: C. nigripalpis

Binomial name
- Chamaemyia nigripalpis Collin, 1966

Species of fly

Chamaemyia nigripalpis is a species of fly in the family Chamaemyiidae. It is found in the Great Britain. Its body length is about 2.5 mm (0.10 in). The type series was collected from a patch of Calamagrostis epigejos where it was repeatedly observed through May to August.
