= Leucopis americana =

Scientific classification
- Domain: Eukaryota
- Kingdom: Animalia
- Phylum: Arthropoda
- Class: Insecta
- Order: Diptera
- Family: Chamaemyiidae
- Subfamily: Chamaemyiinae
- Tribe: Leucopini
- Genus: Leucopis
- Species: L. americana

Binomial name
- Leucopis americana Malloch, 1921

Synonyms
- Leucopis glyphinivora Tanasijtshuk

Species of fly

Leucopis americana is a species of fly in the family Chamaemyiidae.
