= Chamaemyia sylvatica =

Scientific classification
- Kingdom: Animalia
- Phylum: Arthropoda
- Class: Insecta
- Order: Diptera
- Family: Chamaemyiidae
- Subfamily: Chamaemyiinae
- Tribe: Chamaemyiini
- Genus: Chamaemyia
- Species: C. sylvatica

Binomial name
- Chamaemyia sylvatica Collin, 1966

Species of fly

Chamaemyia sylvatica is a species of fly in the family Chamaemyiidae. It is found in Europe and the Near East with records from the British Isles, the Netherlands, Poland, Switzerland, Bulgaria, and (Asian) Turkey. Its body length varies between 2.5 and 3 mm (0.10 and 0.12 in).
