= Leucopis bellula =

Scientific classification
- Domain: Eukaryota
- Kingdom: Animalia
- Phylum: Arthropoda
- Class: Insecta
- Order: Diptera
- Family: Chamaemyiidae
- Subfamily: Chamaemyiinae
- Tribe: Leucopini
- Genus: Leucopis
- Species: L. bellula

Binomial name
- Leucopis bellula Williston, 1889

Species of fly

Leucopis bellula is a species of fly in the family Chamaemyiidae.
