= Poecilosomella conspicua =

Scientific classification
- Kingdom: Animalia
- Phylum: Arthropoda
- Class: Insecta
- Order: Diptera
- Family: Sphaeroceridae
- Genus: Poecilosomella
- Species: P. conspicua

Binomial name
- Poecilosomella conspicua Papp, 2002

Species of fly

Poecilosomella conspicua is a distinctive species of flies belonging to the family Sphaeroceridae. It is only known from the Crocker Range, Sabah in northern Borneo.

This is a large and robust fly compared to most of its congeners, with a body length of up to 3 mm. The body is generally dark with prominent yellow rings on the legs and yellow base to the halteres. The wings are brown with some darker and lighter markings.
