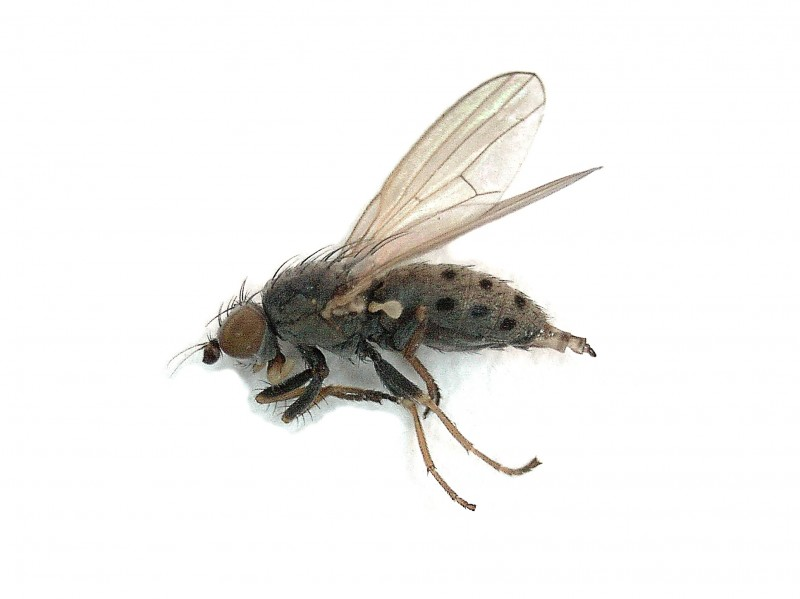
- Chamaemyia cf.flavipalpis (female imago), Arnhem, the Netherlands.

Scientific classification
- Kingdom: Animalia
- Phylum: Arthropoda
- Clade: Pancrustacea
- Class: Insecta
- Order: Diptera
- Family: Chamaemyiidae
- Subfamily: Chamaemyiinae
- Tribe: Chamaemyiini
- Genus: Chamaemyia
- Species: C. flavipalpis

Binomial name
- Chamaemyia flavipalpis (Haliday, 1838)

Synonyms
- Ochtiphila flavipalpis Haliday, 1838

= Chamaemyia flavipalpis =

Species of fly

Chamaemyia flavipalpis is a species of fly in the family Chamaemyiidae. It is found in the Palearctic. and North Africa.

O. flavipalpis is a heavily dusted silver grey fly with a body length of 2.2 to 3.4 mm. Its head is not longer than high and equipped with orbital and ocular setae. The frons is uniformly grey. The antennae are almost entirely yellow. The colour of the palps is yellow. The mesothoracic chaetotaxy includes three pairs of macrochaetae. The subcosta of the wing is complete. The abdomen has tergites without black bands, but in females they have the third to fifth tergites with four dark spots each. The male reproductive organs are characterized by a wide and slightly posteriorly elongated base of the phallus.

Content in this edit is translated from the existing Polish Wikipedia article at pl:Chamaemyia flavipalpis; see its history for attribution
