= Chamaemyia triorbiseta =

Scientific classification
- Kingdom: Animalia
- Phylum: Arthropoda
- Class: Insecta
- Order: Diptera
- Family: Chamaemyiidae
- Subfamily: Chamaemyiinae
- Tribe: Chamaemyiini
- Genus: Chamaemyia
- Species: C. triorbiseta

Binomial name
- Chamaemyia triorbiseta Beschovski & Tanassijtchuk, 1990

Species of fly

Chamaemyia triorbiseta is a species of fly in the family Chamaemyiidae. It is found in Scotland.
