= Acrometopia wahlbergi =

Scientific classification
- Kingdom: Animalia
- Phylum: Arthropoda
- Class: Insecta
- Order: Diptera
- Family: Chamaemyiidae
- Genus: Acrometopia
- Species: A. wahlbergi

Binomial name
- Acrometopia wahlbergi (Zetterstedt, 1846)

Synonyms
- Oxyrhina wahlbergi Zetterstedt, 1846

Species of fly

Acrometopia wahlbergi is a species of fly belonging to the family Chamaemyiidae. It is native to Northern and Central Europe.
