= Chamaemyia paludosa =

Scientific classification
- Kingdom: Animalia
- Phylum: Arthropoda
- Class: Insecta
- Order: Diptera
- Family: Chamaemyiidae
- Subfamily: Chamaemyiinae
- Tribe: Chamaemyiini
- Genus: Chamaemyia
- Species: C. paludosa

Binomial name
- Chamaemyia paludosa Collin, 1966

Species of fly

Chamaemyia paludosa is a species of fly in the family Chamaemyiidae. It is found in Europe and North America. Its body length is about 3 mm (0.12 in).
