= Parochthiphila argentiseta =

Scientific classification
- Domain: Eukaryota
- Kingdom: Animalia
- Phylum: Arthropoda
- Class: Insecta
- Order: Diptera
- Family: Chamaemyiidae
- Genus: Parochthiphila
- Species: P. argentiseta

Binomial name
- Parochthiphila argentiseta Ebejer & Raspi, 2008

Species of fly

Parochthiphila argentiseta is a species of fly in the family Chamaemyiidae. It is present in Turkey.
