= Poecilosomella brevisecunda =

Scientific classification
- Kingdom: Animalia
- Phylum: Arthropoda
- Class: Insecta
- Order: Diptera
- Family: Sphaeroceridae
- Genus: Poecilosomella
- Species: P. brevisecunda

Binomial name
- Poecilosomella brevisecunda Papp, 2002

Species of fly

Poecilosomella brevisecunda is a species of fly belonging to the family Sphaeroceridae. It has only been recorded from Gunung Leuser National Park in northern Sumatra, Indonesia.

This is a tiny fly up to 2mm in length. It is a generally dark brown species with prominent light-coloured rings on the legs and a shiny yellowish facial plate. The wings are also dark, with pale crossveins. The halteres have a yellow stalk with a brown knob.
