= Chamaemyia hungarica =

Scientific classification
- Kingdom: Animalia
- Phylum: Arthropoda
- Class: Insecta
- Order: Diptera
- Family: Chamaemyiidae
- Subfamily: Chamaemyiinae
- Tribe: Chamaemyiini
- Genus: Chamaemyia
- Species: C. hungarica

Binomial name
- Chamaemyia hungarica Tanasijtshuk & Beschovski, 1991

Species of fly

Chamaemyia hungarica is a species of fly in the family Chamaemyiidae. It was first described by Tanasijtshuk and Beschovski in 1991. It is only found in Hungary.
