= Chamaemyia bicolor =

Scientific classification
- Kingdom: Animalia
- Phylum: Arthropoda
- Class: Insecta
- Order: Diptera
- Family: Chamaemyiidae
- Subfamily: Chamaemyiinae
- Tribe: Chamaemyiini
- Genus: Chamaemyia
- Species: C. bicolor

Binomial name
- Chamaemyia bicolor Beschovski, 1994

Species of fly

Chamaemyia bicolor is a species of fly in the family Chamaemyiidae. It is found in the Palearctic.
