= László Papp (disambiguation) =

László Papp is the name of:

- László Papp, Hungarian boxer
- László Papp (wrestler), Hungarian wrestler
- László Papp (clergyman), see László Tőkés
- László Papp (entomologist), born 1946
- László Papp Hungarian politician, mayor of Debrecen
- László Papp Budapest Sports Arena
