= Melametopia =

Scientific classification
- Domain: Eukaryota
- Kingdom: Animalia
- Phylum: Arthropoda
- Class: Insecta
- Order: Diptera
- Family: Chamaemyiidae
- Subfamily: Chamaemyiinae
- Tribe: Chamaemyiini
- Genus: Melametopia; Tanasijtshuk, 1992

Type species
- Coniceps carbonaria (Loew, 1873)

Genus of flies

Melametopia is a genus of flies in the family Chamaemyiidae.

== Species ==
- M. carbonaria (Loew, 1873)
