= Anchioleucopis =

Scientific classification
- Domain: Eukaryota
- Kingdom: Animalia
- Phylum: Arthropoda
- Class: Insecta
- Order: Diptera
- Family: Chamaemyiidae
- Tribe: Leucopini
- Genus: Anchioleucopis; Tanasijtshuk, 1997

Genus of flies

Anchioleucopis is a genus of flies belonging to the family Chamaemyiidae.

Species:

- Anchioleucopis macalpinei Tanasijtshuk, 2001
