= Leucopis =

Scientific classification
- Domain: Eukaryota
- Kingdom: Animalia
- Phylum: Arthropoda
- Class: Insecta
- Order: Diptera
- Family: Chamaemyiidae
- Subfamily: Chamaemyiinae
- Tribe: Leucopini
- Genus: Leucopis; Meigen, 1830

Type species
- Anthomyza griseola Fallén, 1823

Genus of flies

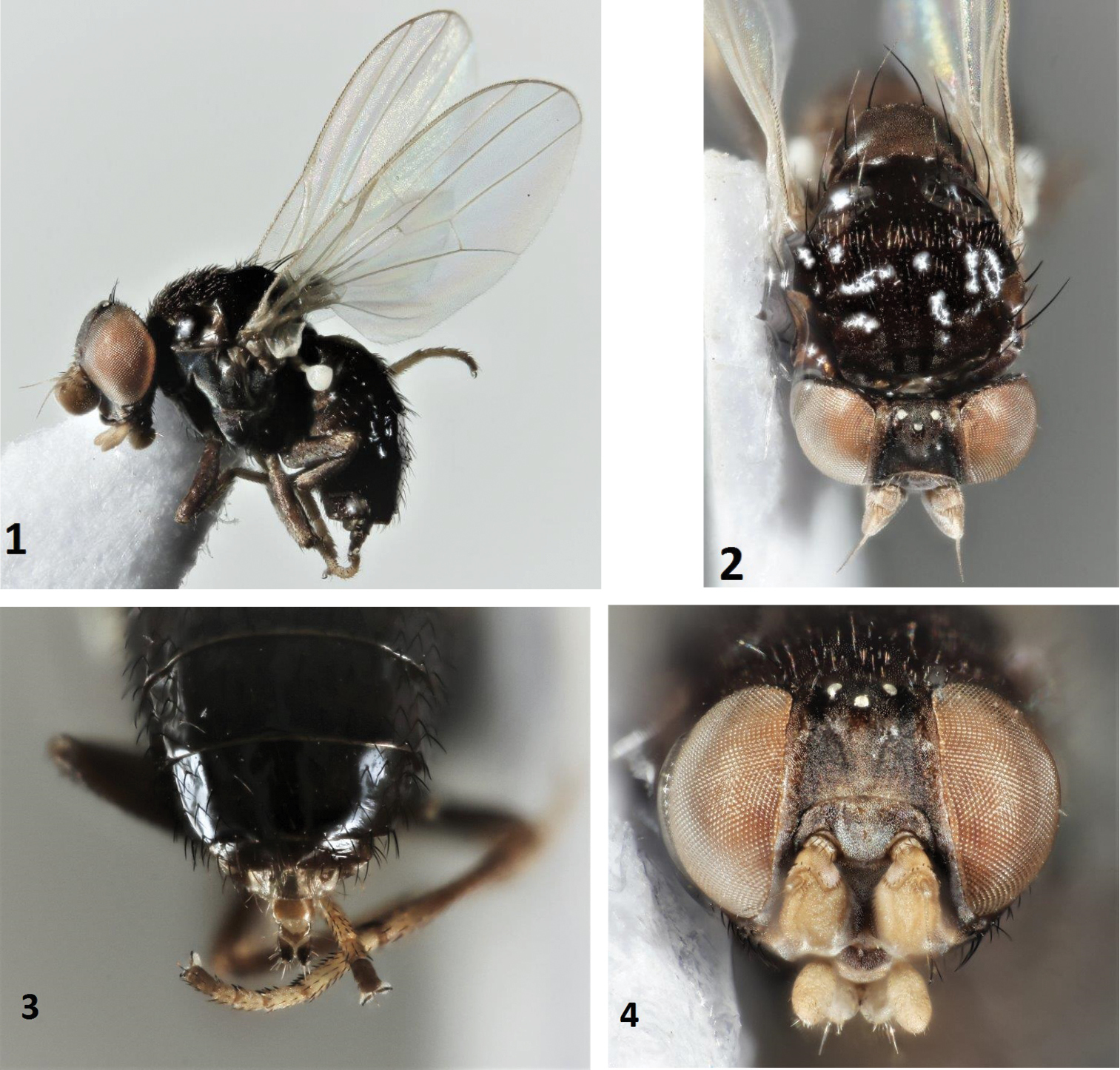

Leucopis is a genus of flies in the family Chamaemyiidae. There are at least 20 described species in Leucopis. Flies from this genus are used in biological control of adelgids.

== Species ==
- L. albipuncta Zetterstedt, 1855
- L. americana Malloch, 1921
- L. ancilla McAlpine, 1971
- L. argentata Heeger, 1848
- L. argenticollis Zetterstedt, 1848
- L. astonei McAlpine, 1977
- L. atratula Ratzburg, 1844
- L. atrifacies Aldrich, 1925
- L. atritarsis Tanasijtshuk, 1958
- L. bellula Williston, 1889
- L. bivittata Malloch, 1940
- L. flavicornis Aldrich, 1914
- L. geniculata Zetterstedt, 1855
- L. glyphinivora Tanasijtshuk, 1958
- L. griseola (Fallén, 1823)
- L. hennigrata McAlpine, 1978
- L. interruptovittata Aczel, 1937
- L. maculata Thompson, 1910
- L. major Malloch, 1921
- L. manii Tanasijtshuk, 1968
- L. melanopus Tanasijtshuk, 1959
- L. militia McAlpine, 1971
- L. minor Malloch, 1921
- L. morgei Smith, 1963
- L. nigraluna McAlpine, 1971
- L. obscura Haliday, 1833
- L. ocellaris Malloch, 1940
- L. parallela Malloch, 1921
- L. pemphigae Malloch, 1921
- L. pinicola Malloch, 1921
- L. piniperda Malloch, 1921
- L. psyllidiphaga McLean, 1998
- L. pulvinariae Malloch, 1921
- L. puncticornis Meigen, 1830
- L. simplex Loew, 1869
- L. tapiae Blanchard, 1964
- L. verticalis Malloch, 1940
