= Lipoleucopis =

Scientific classification
- Domain: Eukaryota
- Kingdom: Animalia
- Phylum: Arthropoda
- Class: Insecta
- Order: Diptera
- Family: Chamaemyiidae
- Tribe: Leucopini
- Genus: Lipoleucopis de Meijere, 1928

Genus of insects

Lipoleucopis is a genus of flies belonging to the family Chamaemyiidae.

The species of this genus are found in England.

Species:

- Lipoleucopis praecox Meijere, 1928
- Lipoleucopis pulchra Raspi, 2008
