= Poecilosomella =

Scientific classification
- Kingdom: Animalia
- Phylum: Arthropoda
- Class: Insecta
- Order: Diptera
- Family: Sphaeroceridae
- Subfamily: Limosininae
- Genus: Poecilosomella; Duda, 1925

Type species
- Copromyza punctipennis Wiedemann, 1824

Synonyms
- Poecilosomela Vanschuytbroeck, 1959

Genus of flies

Poecilosomella is a genus of flies belonging to the family Sphaeroceridae. These small flies, often with attractive patterning on the wings and body, are commonly found in a wide range of habitats throughout the Old World and Australasia.

== Species ==
- P. aciculata (Deeming, 1969)
- P. additionalis Papp, 2010
- P. affinis Hayashi, 2002
- P. albipes (Duda, 1925)
- P. amputata (Duda, 1925)
- P. angulata (Thomson, 1869)
- P. annulitibia (Deeming, 1969)
- P. arnaudi Papp, 1990
- P. biseta Dong, Yang & Hayashi, 2006
- P. borboroides (Walker, 1860)
- P. borborus Papp, 2002
- P. brevisecunda Papp, 2002
- P. brunettii (Deeming, 1969)
- P. capensis Papp, 1990
- P. conspicua Papp, 2002
- P. cryptica Papp, 1991
- P. curvipes Papp, 2002
- P. duploseriata Papp, 2010
- P. formosana Papp, 2002
- P. furcata (Duda, 1925)
- P. guangdongensis Dong, Yang & Hayashi, 2006
- P. hayashii Papp, 2002
- P. himalayensis (Deeming, 1969)
- P. hyalipennis Hackman, 1965
- P. insularis Hayashi, 1997
- P. kittenbergeri Papp, 2010
- P. longecostata (Duda, 1925)
- P. longicalcar Papp, 2002
- P. longichaeta Dong, Yang & Hayashi, 2007
- P. longinervis (Duda, 1925)
- P. lusingana (Vanschuytbroeck, 1959)
- P. maxima (Vanschuytbroeck, 1950)
- P. meijerei (Duda, 1925)
- P. mirabilis Vanschuytbroeck, 1951
- P. multicolor (Richards, 1968)
- P. multipunctata (Duda, 1925)
- P. nepalensis (Deeming, 1969)
- P. nigra Papp, 2002
- P. nigrotibiata (Duda, 1925)
- P. occulta Papp, 2010
- P. pallidimana (Duda, 1925)
- P. pappi Hayashi, 1997
- P. paraciculata Papp, 2002
- P. paracryptica Papp, 2002
- P. parangulata Papp, 2010
- P. pectiniterga (Deeming, 1964)
- P. peniculifera Papp, 2002
- P. perinetica (Hackman, 1967)
- P. pictitarsis (Richards, 1938)
- P. pilimana Papp, 2002
- P. pilipino Papp, 2002
- P. punctipennis (Wiedemann, 1824)
- P. rectinervis (Duda, 1925)
- P. ronkayi Papp, 2002
- P. sabahi Papp, 2002
- P. setimanus Papp, 2010
- P. setosissima Papp, 2010
- P. spinicauda Papp, 2002
- P. spinipes Papp, 2002
- P. subpilimana Papp, 2002
- P. tridens Dong, Yang & Hayashi, 2007
- P. varians (Duda, 1925)
