= Leucopomyia =

Scientific classification
- Domain: Eukaryota
- Kingdom: Animalia
- Phylum: Arthropoda
- Class: Insecta
- Order: Diptera
- Family: Chamaemyiidae
- Tribe: Leucopini
- Genus: Leucopomyia; Malloch, 1921

Genus of flies

Leucopomyia is a genus of flies belonging to the family Chamaemyiidae.

Species:

- Leucopomyia alticeps (Czerny, 1936)
