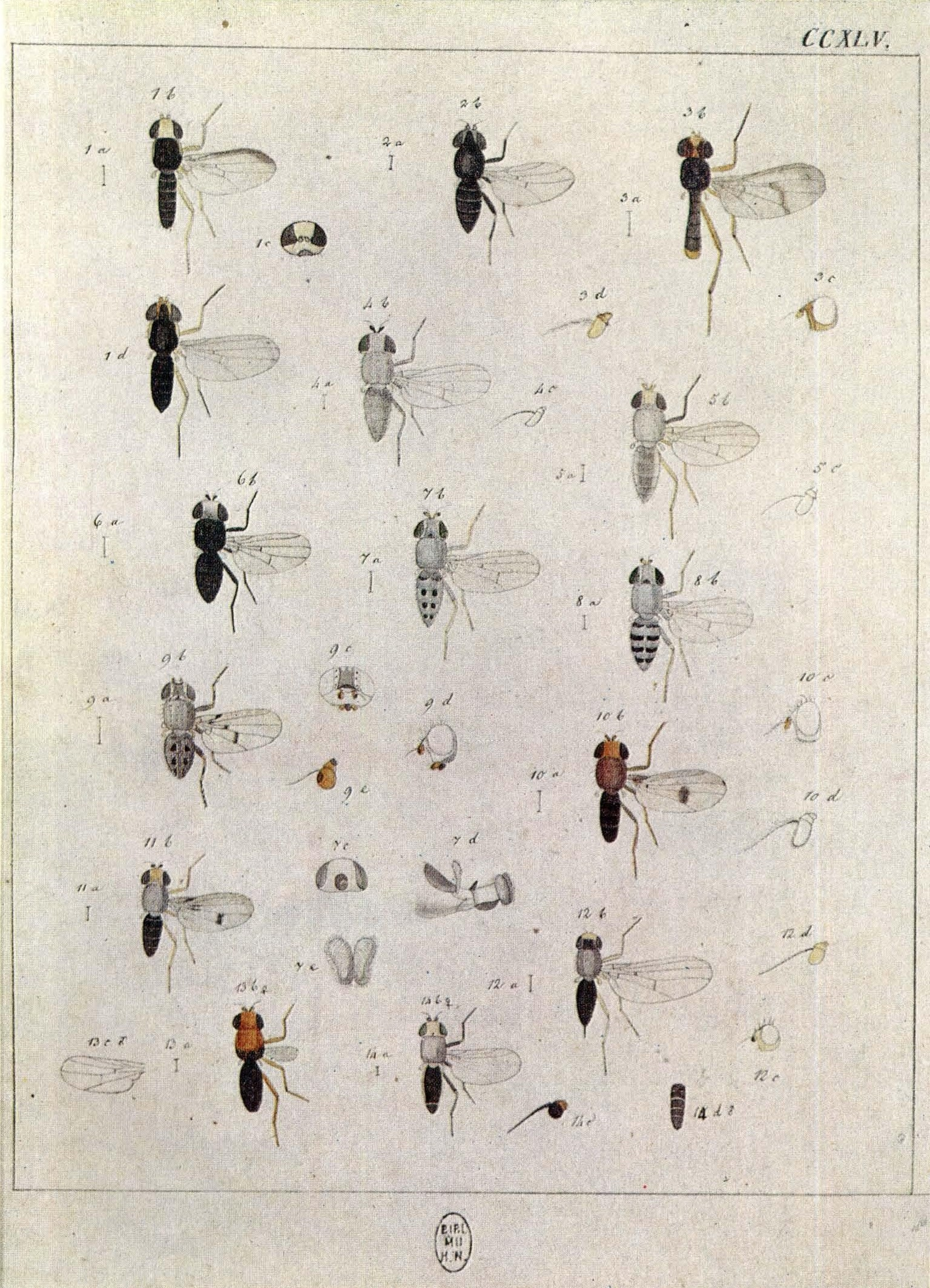
- 8. Ochthiphila elegans Panzer, 1809 synonym of Chamaemyia elegans Panzer, 1809 figure in plate from Europäischen Zweiflügeligen

Scientific classification
- Domain: Eukaryota
- Kingdom: Animalia
- Phylum: Arthropoda
- Class: Insecta
- Order: Diptera
- Family: Chamaemyiidae
- Subfamily: Chamaemyiinae
- Tribe: Chamaemyiini
- Genus: Chamaemyia; Meigen, 1803

Type species
- Ochtiphila elegans Panzer, 1809

Synonyms
- Ochtiphila Fallén, 1823; Ochthiphila Meigen, 1830; Estelia Robineau-Desvoidy, 1830

= Chamaemyia =

Genus of flies

Chamaemyia is a genus of flies in the family Chamaemyiidae. It is the type genus of its family.

== Species ==
- C. aestiva Tanasijtshuk, 1970
- C. aridella (Fallén, 1823)
- C. bicolor Beschovski, 1994
- C. campestris Tanasijtshuk, 1970
- C. elegans (Panzer, 1809)
- C. emiliae Tanasijtshuk, 1970
- C. fasciata (Loew, 1858)
- C. flavicornis (Strobl, 1902)
- C. flavipalpis (Haliday, 1838)
- C. flavipes (Macquart, 1835)
- C. flavoantennata Beschovski, 1994
- C. fumicosta Malloch, 1940
- C. fumida Tanasijtshuk, 1986
- C. geniculata (Haliday, 1838)
- C. geniculata (Zetterstedt, 1838)
- C. herbarum (Robineau-Desvoidy, 1830)
- C. hungarica Tanasijtshuk & Beschovski, 1991
- C. hypsophila Tanasijtshuk, 1986
- C. impunctata (Robineau-Desvoidy, 1830)
- C. juncorum (Fallén, 1823)
- C. luzonensis (Malloch, 1926)
- C. macrura Tanasijtshuk, 1970
- C. maritima (Zetterstedt, 1846)
- C. nataliae Tanasijtshuk, 1986
- C. nigricornis (Perris, 1852)
- C. nigripalpis Collin, 1966
- C. nigripes (Macquart, 1835)
- C. obscuripes (Rondani, 1874)
- C. paludosa Collin, 1966
- C. polystigma (Meigen, 1830)
- C. pulchra (Roser, 1840)
- C. sexnotata (Thomson, 1869)
- C. stigmata Tanasijtshuk, 1979
- C. subjuncorum Tanasijtshuk, 1970
- C. submontana Beschovski, 1994
- C. sylvatica Collin, 1966
- C. taiwanensis Papp, 2005
- C. triorbiseta Beschovski & Tanassijtchuk, 1990
