= Hamecamyia =

Scientific classification
- Domain: Eukaryota
- Kingdom: Animalia
- Phylum: Arthropoda
- Class: Insecta
- Order: Diptera
- Family: Chamaemyiidae
- Tribe: Chamaemyiini
- Genus: Hamecamyia; Gaimari, 2012

Genus of flies

Hamecamyia is a genus of flies belonging to the family Chamaemyiidae.

Species:

- Hamecamyia stuckenbergi Gaimari, 2012
