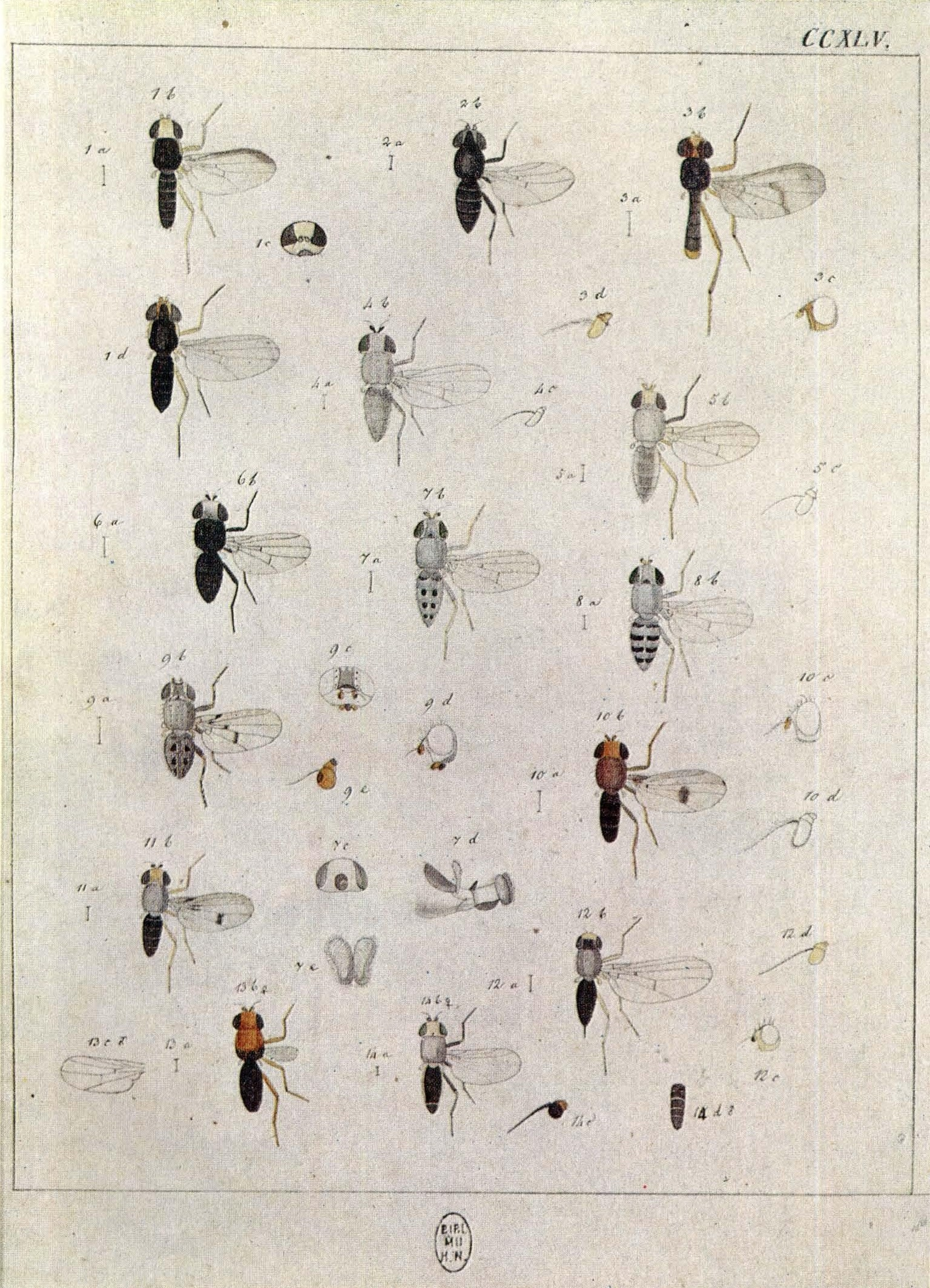
- Ochthiphila elegans Panzer, 1809 synonym of Chamaemya elegans Panzer, 1809 figure in plate from Meigen's Systematische Beschreibung der bekannten europäischen zweiflügeligenInsekten

Scientific classification
- Kingdom: Animalia
- Phylum: Arthropoda
- Class: Insecta
- Order: Diptera
- Family: Chamaemyiidae
- Subfamily: Chamaemyiinae
- Tribe: Chamaemyiini
- Genus: Chamaemyia
- Species: C. elegans

Binomial name
- Chamaemyia elegans (Panzer, 1809)

Synonyms
- Ochthiphila elegans Panzer, 1809; Ochtiphila pulchra Roser, 1840

= Chamaemyia elegans =

Species of fly

Chamaemyia elegans is a species of fly in the family Chamaemyiidae. It is widely distributed in Europe.
