= Chamaeleucopis =

Scientific classification
- Kingdom: Animalia
- Phylum: Arthropoda
- Clade: Pancrustacea
- Class: Insecta
- Order: Diptera
- Family: Chamaemyiidae
- Subfamily: Chamaemyiinae
- Tribe: Chamaemyiini
- Genus: Chamaeleucopis; Gaimari, 2012

Type species
- Chamaeleucopis trevas Gaimari, 2012

Genus of flies

Acrometopia is a genus of flies in the family Chamaemyiidae.

== Species ==
- C. trevas Gaimari, 2012
