= Pseudodinia =

Scientific classification
- Domain: Eukaryota
- Kingdom: Animalia
- Phylum: Arthropoda
- Class: Insecta
- Order: Diptera
- Family: Chamaemyiidae
- Tribe: Chamaemyiini
- Genus: Pseudodinia; Coquillett, 1902

Genus of flies

Pseudodinia is a genus of flies in the family Chamaemyiidae. There are about 17 described species in Pseudodinia.

== Species ==
These 17 species belong to the genus Pseudodinia:

- P. angelica Barber, 1985^{i c g}
- P. angustata Barber, 1985^{i c g}
- P. antennalis Malloch, 1940^{i c g b}
- P. cinerea Barber, 1985^{i c g}
- P. hamata Barber, 1985^{i c g}
- P. latiphallis Barber, 1985^{i c g}
- P. melanitida Barber, 1985^{c g}
- P. melantida Barber, 1985^{i c g}
- P. meridionalis Hennig, 1947^{c g}
- P. nigritarsis Barber, 1985^{i c g}
- P. nitens (Melander and Spuler, 1917)^{i c g}
- P. obscura Barber, 1985^{c g}
- P. occidentalis Barber, 1985^{i c g}
- P. polita Malloch, 1915
- P. slussi Barber, 1985^{i c g}
- P. tuberculata Barber, 1985^{c g}
- P. varipes Coquillett, 1902^{i c g}

Data sources: i = ITIS, c = Catalogue of Life, g = GBIF, b = Bugguide.net
