= Echinoleucopis =

Scientific classification
- Domain: Eukaryota
- Kingdom: Animalia
- Phylum: Arthropoda
- Class: Insecta
- Order: Diptera
- Family: Chamaemyiidae
- Tribe: Leucopini
- Genus: Echinoleucopis; Gaimari & Tanasijtshuk, 2001

Genus of flies

Echinoleucopis is a genus of flies belonging to the family Chamaemyiidae.

Species:

- Echinoleucopis bennetti Gaimari & Tanasijtshuk, 2001
- Echinoleucopis ceroplastophaga (Blanchard, 1938)
- Echinoleucopis grioti Gaimari & Tanasijtshuk, 2001
- Echinoleucopis iota Gaimari & Tanasijtshuk, 2001
- Echinoleucopis lota Gaimari & Tanasijtshuk, 2001
- Echinoleucopis macula Gaimari & Tanasijtshuk, 2001
- Echinoleucopis nigrolinea Gaimari & Tanasijtshuk, 2001
