= Parochthiphila =

Scientific classification
- Domain: Eukaryota
- Kingdom: Animalia
- Phylum: Arthropoda
- Class: Insecta
- Order: Diptera
- Family: Chamaemyiidae
- Subfamily: Chamaemyiinae
- Tribe: Chamaemyiini
- Genus: Parochthiphila; Czerny, 1904

Genus of flies

Parochthiphila is a genus of flies belonging to the family Chamaemyiidae.

The species of this genus are found in Europe and Africa.

Species:

- Parochthiphila aethiopica Hennig, 1938
- Parochthiphila argentiseta Ebejer & Raspi, 2008
