= Ortalidina =

Scientific classification
- Domain: Eukaryota
- Kingdom: Animalia
- Phylum: Arthropoda
- Class: Insecta
- Order: Diptera
- Family: Chamaemyiidae
- Subfamily: Chamaemyiinae
- Tribe: Chamaemyiini
- Genus: Ortalidina; Blanchard, 1852

Type species
- Acrometopia cellularis Blanchard, 1852

Genus of flies

Ortalidina is a genus of flies in the family Chamaemyiidae.

== Species ==
- O. cellularis Blanchard, 1852
