= Melanochthiphila =

Scientific classification
- Kingdom: Animalia
- Phylum: Arthropoda
- Class: Insecta
- Order: Diptera
- Family: Chamaemyiidae
- Subfamily: Chamaemyiinae
- Tribe: Chamaemyiini
- Genus: Melanochthiphila; Frey, 1958

Type species
- Parochthiphila nigroaenea Frey, 1958

Genus of flies

Melametopia is a genus of flies in the family Chamaemyiidae.

== Species ==
The following two species are recognised in the genus Melanochthiphila:

- Melanochthiphila arabica Ebejer, 2017
- Melanochthiphila nigroaenea (Frey, 1958)
