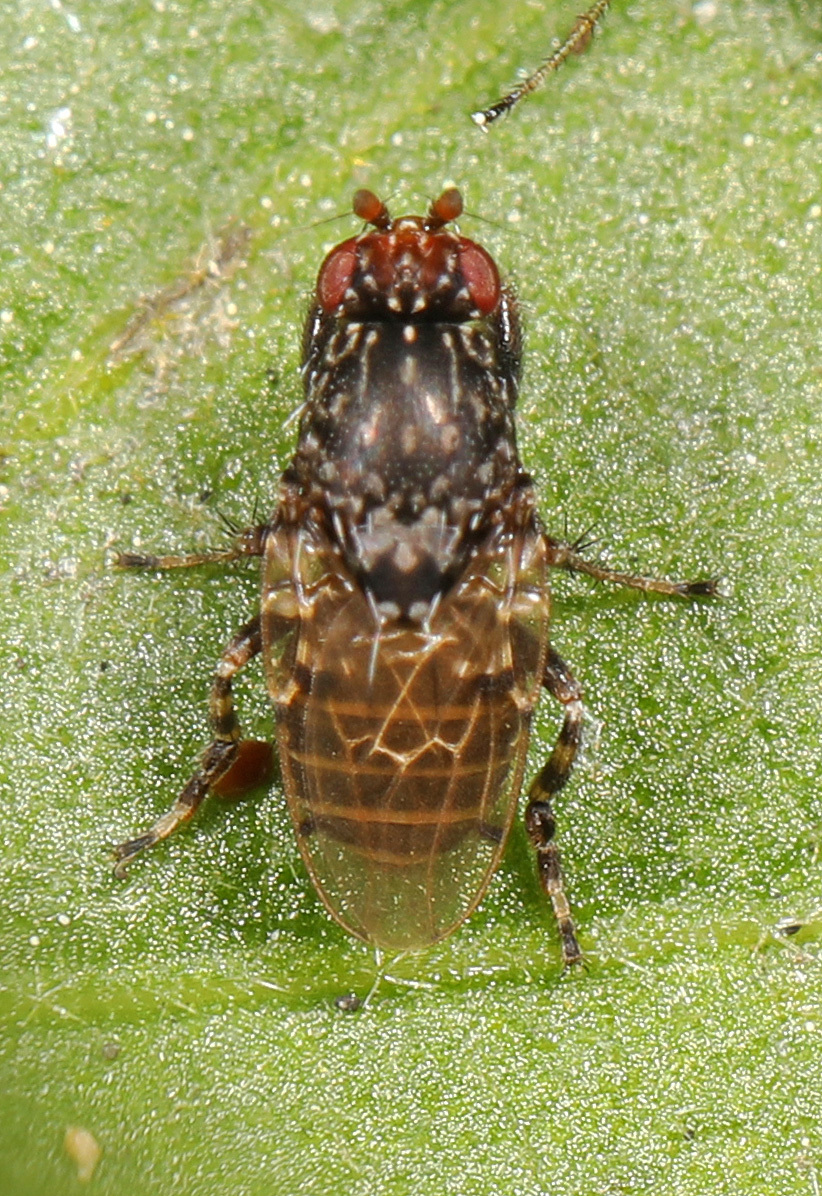

Scientific classification
- Domain: Eukaryota
- Kingdom: Animalia
- Phylum: Arthropoda
- Class: Insecta
- Order: Diptera
- Family: Sphaeroceridae
- Genus: Poecilosomella
- Species: P. angulata

Binomial name
- Poecilosomella angulata (Thomson, 1869)

Synonyms
- Borborus venalicia Osten Sacken, 1878; Limosina angulata Thomson, 1869

= Poecilosomella angulata =

Species of fly

Poecilosomella angulata is a species of lesser dung fly in the family Sphaeroceridae.
