= Acrometopia =

Scientific classification
- Kingdom: Animalia
- Phylum: Arthropoda
- Clade: Pancrustacea
- Class: Insecta
- Order: Diptera
- Family: Chamaemyiidae
- Subfamily: Chamaemyiinae
- Tribe: Chamaemyiini
- Genus: Acrometopia; Schiner, 1862

Type species
- Oxyrhina wahlbergi Zetterstedt, 1846

Synonyms
- Acrometopida Enderlein, 1929

Genus of flies

Acrometopia is a genus of flies in the family Chamaemyiidae.

== Species ==
- A. annulitibia Smith, 1966
- A. conspicua Papp, 2005
- A. setosifrons Cogan, 1978
- A. carbonaria (Loew, 1873)
- A. cellularis (Blanchard, 1852)
- A. reicherti (Enderlein, 1929)
- A. wahlbergi (Zetterstedt, 1846)
