= Ouratea jamaicensis =

Conservation status
- Near Threatened (IUCN 2.3)

Scientific classification
- Kingdom: Plantae
- Clade: Tracheophytes
- Clade: Angiosperms
- Clade: Eudicots
- Clade: Rosids
- Order: Malpighiales
- Family: Ochnaceae
- Genus: Ouratea
- Species: O. jamaicensis

Binomial name
- Ouratea jamaicensis (Planch.) Urb.

Species of flowering plant

Ouratea jamaicensis is a species of plant in the family Ochnaceae. It is endemic to Jamaica.
