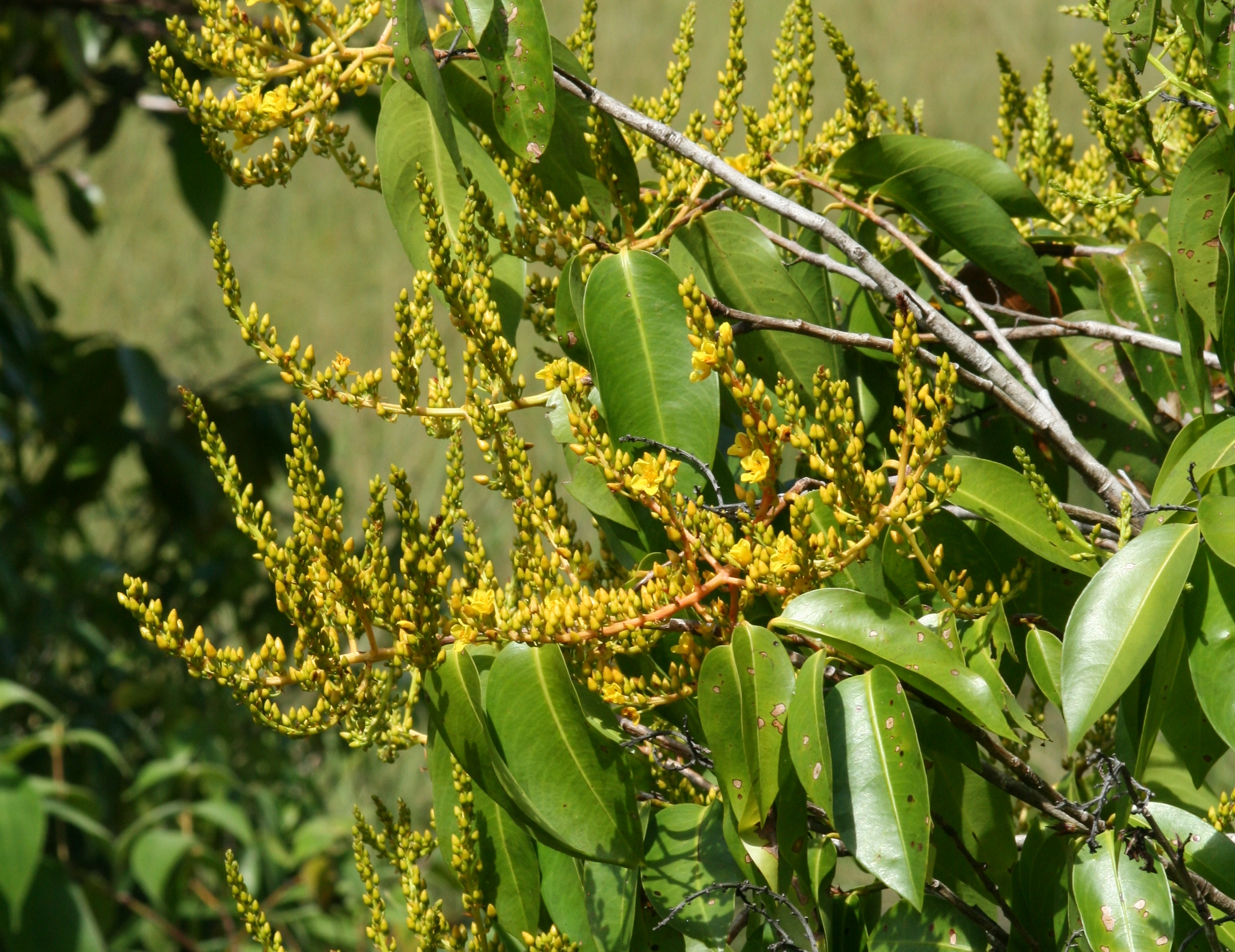
- Flowering branches of Ouratea brevicalyx

Scientific classification
- Kingdom: Plantae
- Clade: Tracheophytes
- Clade: Angiosperms
- Clade: Eudicots
- Clade: Rosids
- Order: Malpighiales
- Family: Ochnaceae
- Genus: Ouratea
- Species: O. brevicalyx

Binomial name
- Ouratea brevicalyx Maguire & Steyerm.

= Ouratea brevicalyx =

Species of shrub

Ouratea brevicalyx is a shrub in the family Ochnaceae, originating in Venezuela.

== Description ==
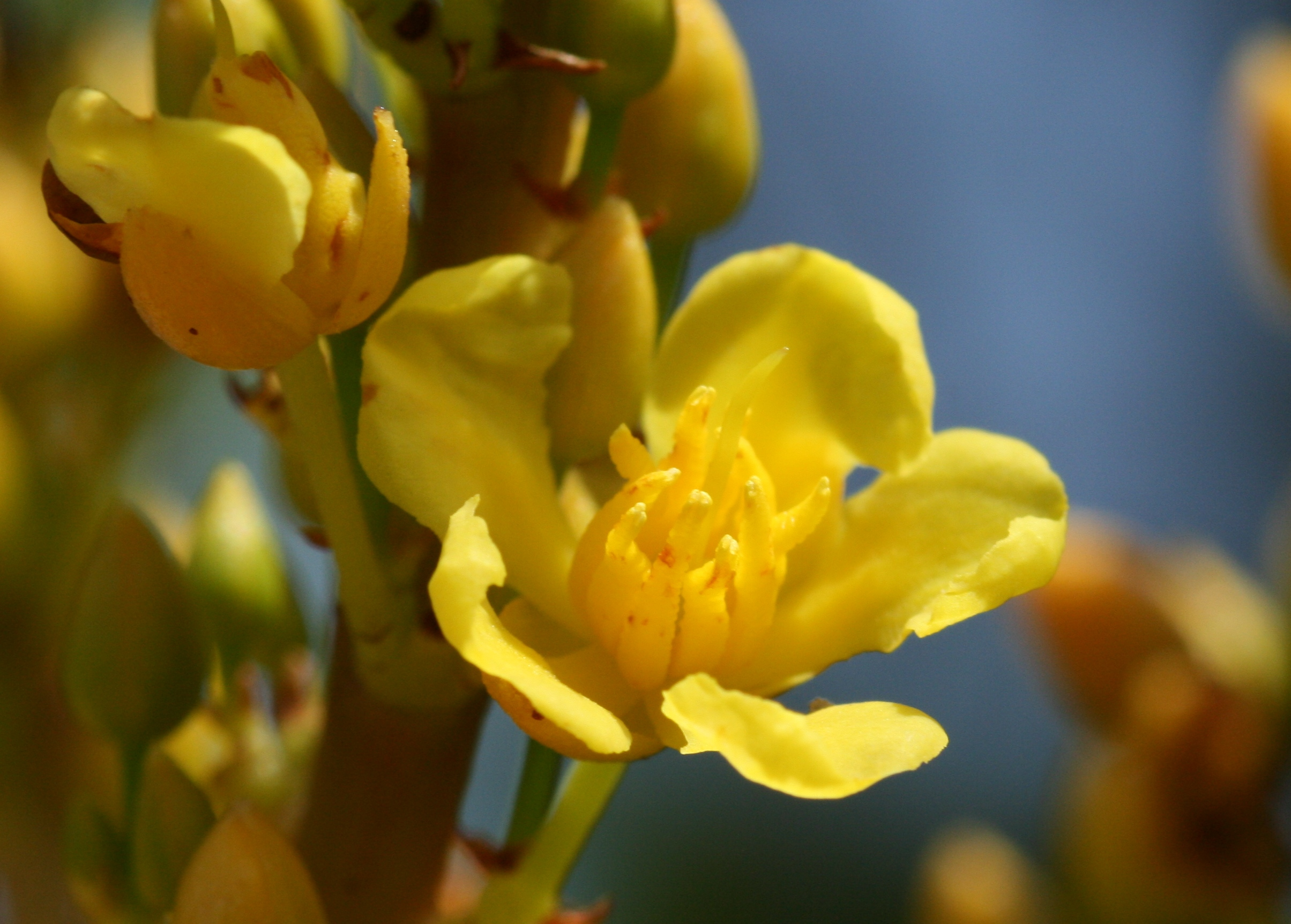
Flowers of Ouratea brevicalyx.

Ouratea brevicalyx is a shrub that is 2 to 5 meters tall when mature, with green to lighter green leaves on the underside, elliptical 7 to 10 cm long and 3 to 4.5 cm wide. The flowers have a yellowish calyx, a bright yellow corolla, stamens and a yellow pistil.

== Location ==
The habitat is savannah and rock gardens of Southern Venezuela up to 1,000 metres (3,300 ft) above sea level.
