= Ouratea prominens =

Conservation status
- Vulnerable (IUCN 2.3)

Scientific classification
- Kingdom: Plantae
- Clade: Tracheophytes
- Clade: Angiosperms
- Clade: Eudicots
- Clade: Rosids
- Order: Malpighiales
- Family: Ochnaceae
- Genus: Ouratea
- Species: O. prominens

Binomial name
- Ouratea prominens Dwyer

Synonyms
- Ouratea cocleensis Dwyer

Species of flowering plant

Ouratea prominens, synonym Ouratea cocleensis, is a species of plant in the family Ochnaceae. It is found in Costa Rica and Panama. It is threatened by habitat loss.
