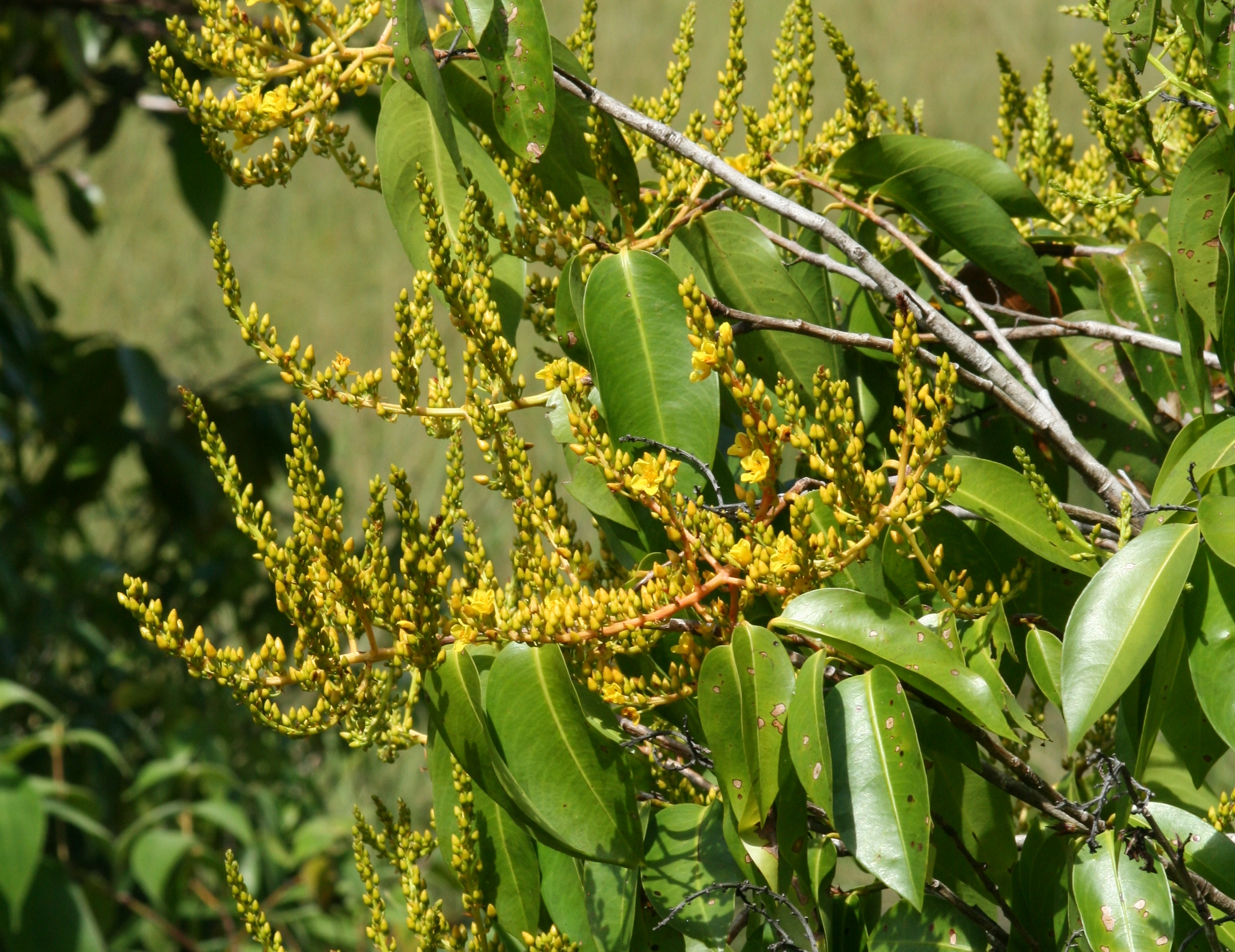
- Ouratea brevicalyx leaves and inflorescences

Scientific classification
- Kingdom: Plantae
- Clade: Tracheophytes
- Clade: Angiosperms
- Clade: Eudicots
- Clade: Rosids
- Order: Malpighiales
- Family: Ochnaceae
- Subfamily: Ochnoideae
- Tribe: Ochneae
- Subtribe: Ochninae
- Genus: Ouratea; Aubl.

Synonyms
- Ancouratea Tiegh.; Camptouratea Tiegh.; Cercanthemum Tiegh.; Cercinia Tiegh.; Cercouratea Tiegh.; Cittorhinchus Willd. ex Kunth; Dasouratea Tiegh.; Diouratea Tiegh.; Gomphia Schreb.; Gymnouratella Tiegh.; Hemiouratea Tiegh.; Isouratea Tiegh.; Kaieteurea Dwyer; Microuratea Tiegh.; Notouratea Tiegh.; Ouratella Tiegh.; Pilouratea Tiegh.; Pleouratea Tiegh.; Plicouratea Tiegh.; Polyouratea Tiegh.; Setouratea Tiegh.; Stenouratea Tiegh.; Tetrouratea Tiegh.; Trichouratea Tiegh.; Villouratea Tiegh.; Volkensteinia Tiegh.; Wolkensteinia Regel

= Ouratea =

Genus of flowering plants

Ouratea is a genus of flowering plants in the family Ochnaceae. It includes over 290 species native to the tropical Americas, from Mexico and Cuba to southern Brazil, to Cameroon and Gabon in West-Central Africa, and to Ascension Island in the South Atlantic. Most species are native to the Americas. There are two African species, Ouratea batesii and Ouratea stenophylla, and Ouratea lessonii is endemic to Ascension. Many genera have been brought into synonymy with Ouratea, including Gomphia.

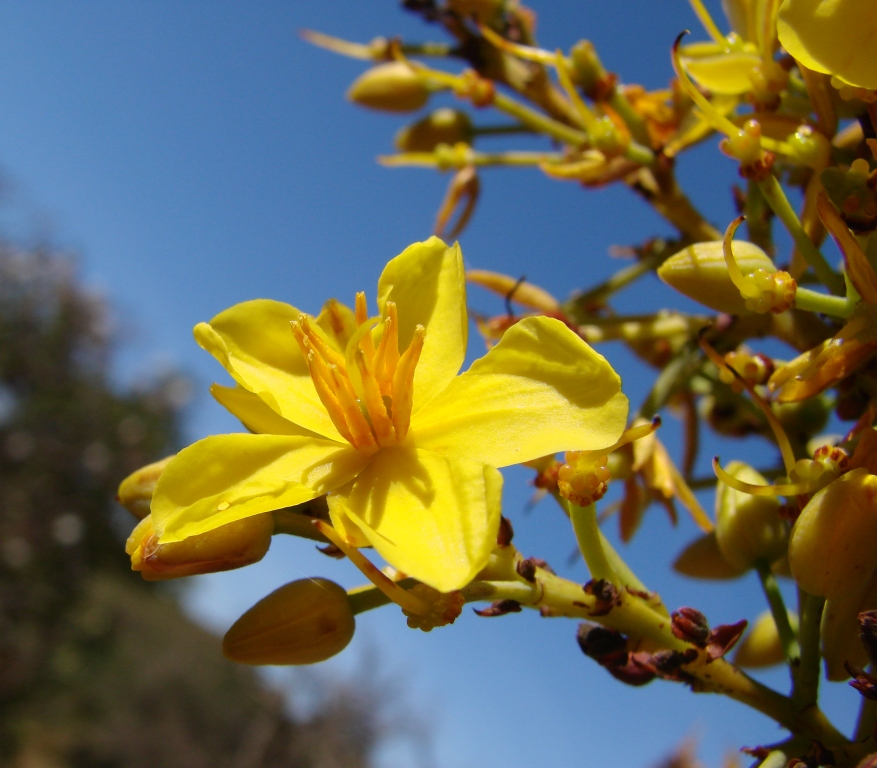
Yellow flower of Ouratea hexasperma

== Species ==
Species include:

- Ouratea brevicalyx
- Ouratea elegans
- Ouratea glomerata
- Ouratea insulae
- Ouratea jamaicensis
- Ouratea patelliformis
- Ouratea prominens
- Ouratea tumacoensis

Former species

- Ouratea amplectens → Campylospermum amplectens
- Ouratea quintasii → Rhabdophyllum arnoldianum
- Ouratea schusteri → Campylospermum scheffleri
