= Ouratea glomerata =

Scientific classification
- Kingdom: Plantae
- Clade: Embryophytes
- Clade: Tracheophytes
- Clade: Angiosperms
- Clade: Eudicots
- Clade: Rosids
- Order: Malpighiales
- Family: Ochnaceae
- Genus: Ouratea
- Species: O. glomerata

Binomial name
- Ouratea glomerata (Pohl) Sastre & Offroy

Synonyms
- Cercouratea glomerata (Pohl) Tiegh., nom. provis.; Gomphia glomerata Pohl

Species of plant

Ouratea glomerata (Pohl) Sastre & Offroy is a species of flowering plant in the family Ochnaceae, native to west-central Brazil. It was first described by Johann Baptist Emanuel Pohl in 1833 as Gomphia glomerata. (Ouratea glomerata (Tiegh.) A.Chev. is a synonym of Campylospermum glomeratum.)
