= Ouratea insulae =

Conservation status
- Vulnerable (IUCN 3.1)

Scientific classification
- Kingdom: Plantae
- Clade: Tracheophytes
- Clade: Angiosperms
- Clade: Eudicots
- Clade: Rosids
- Order: Malpighiales
- Family: Ochnaceae
- Genus: Ouratea
- Species: O. insulae

Binomial name
- Ouratea insulae L.Riley

Synonyms
- Ouratea pyramidalis L.Riley

Species of flowering plant

Ouratea insulae is a species of flowering plant in the family Ochnaceae. It is a tree native to southern Mexico (Veracruz and southeastern Mexico), Guatemala, Honduras, and Panama.
