= Ouratea tumacoensis =

Conservation status
- Vulnerable (IUCN 2.3)

Scientific classification
- Kingdom: Plantae
- Clade: Tracheophytes
- Clade: Angiosperms
- Clade: Eudicots
- Clade: Rosids
- Order: Malpighiales
- Family: Ochnaceae
- Genus: Ouratea
- Species: O. tumacoensis

Binomial name
- Ouratea tumacoensis Sastre

Species of flowering plant

Ouratea tumacoensis is a species of plant in the family Ochnaceae. It is endemic to Colombia.
