= László Papp (entomologist) =

Hungarian zoologist (1946–2021)

László Papp (October 3, 1946 – March 28, 2021) was a Hungarian zoologist, entomologist, parasitologist awarded with the Széchenyi Prize, ordinary member of the Hungarian Academy of Sciences (HAS) and fellow of the Royal Entomological Society. Renowned research professor in the field of community ecology and systematics of Diptera. Older brother of the heart surgeon professor Lajos Papp.

== Biography ==
Papp was born in Aranyosgadány. He started his university studies at the Eötvös Lorand University (ELTE) science faculty in 1965, received his MSc degree in biology in 1970 and the university doctorate in 1971. He became an employee at the Zoology Department of the Hungarian Natural History Museum (HNHM), where he had worked for ten years, then became a primary school teacher in biology for two years in Vecsés. He started teaching at the University of Veterinary Medicine in 1982 and returned to the HNHM in 1986. He became the head of the Animal Ecology Research Group of the HAS and the HNHM and also received a teaching professor assignment. Besides his work in the collections of the HNHM he had been teaching classes at the Veterinary University, University of Szeged, University of Debrecen and Eötvös Lorand University (ELTE).

== Research ==
Papp's main research area is morphology and taxonomy of imagoes and larvae of two-winged insects (Diptera), and the population structure and community ecology of flying insects as well as research on rare insect species and their nature conservation. His collecting expeditions and taxonomic work made a major contribution to the Diptera collections in the HNHM, thanks to these efforts more than half of the presently existing specimen holdings (1 million individuals) is connected to his activities

During his work in insect systematics and zoological nomenclature he discovered and authored 5 family-group names, 97 genus-group names and 747 species-group names new to science; at the same time there have been 32 species-group names and one genus-group name established in honour of him. He also reported 2000 species new to the Hungarian fauna for the first time. He authored 368 articles, book chapters and books, including as co-editor and author of 13 volumes of the Catalogue of Palaearctic Diptera (1984–1993), with a combined length of 5,000 pages with 58 authors; together with Prof. Béla Darvas they edited the series of Contributions to a Manual of Palaearctic Diptera (1996–2000), the four volumes comprise 3,000 pages by 84 authors; together with Miloš Černý he published the four volumes of the Agromyzidae (Diptera) of Hungary (2015–2019) on 1,880 pages with 6,300 figures and discussing altogether 623 species.

== Awards and prizes ==
- Fellow of the Royal Entomological Society (1991–2021)
- Ipolyi Arnold Prize for the advancement of science (1995, OTKA)
- "For the Hungarian Ecology" Prize (2003, Hungarian Ecological Society)
- Széchenyi Prize (2004) (shared with Sándor Mahunka)
- Golden Medal of Imre Frivaldszky (2014, Hungarian Entomological Society)

== Main publications ==
- Papp, L. (1977). "Sphaeroceridae (Díptera) in the Collection of the Hungarian Natural History Museum I. Archiborborus Duda, 1921" (PDF). Opuscula Zoologica Instituti Zoosystematici Universitatis Budapestinensis. 14 (1–2): 91–97.
- Papp, L (1980). "New taxa of the acalyptrate flies (Diptera: Tunisimyiidae fam. n., Risidae, Ephydridae: Nannodastiinae subfam. n.)". Acta Zoologica Academiae Scientiarum Hungaricae. 26 (4): 415–431. INIST PASCALZOOLINEINRA8110065464.
- Papp, L (1995). "Dipterous assemblages of sheep-run droppings in Hungary (Diptera) I.: Qualitative results". Folia Entomologica Hungarica. 56: 153–162.
- A repülő rovarok abundanciájáról : a légyfogás elmélete : akadémiai székfoglaló [Abundance of Flying Insects – the Theory of Catching Flies] 1991. április 30. (1993) [in Hungarian]
- Papp, L., & Silva, V. C. (1995). Seven new genera of the neotropical Lauxaniidae (Diptera). Siete nuevos géneros de Lauxaniidae (Diptera) neotropicales. Acta Zoologica Academiae Scientiarum Hungaricae., 41(3), 185-208.
- Papp, L.; Izsák, J.; L., Ádám (1997). "Dipterous assemblages of sheep-run droppings: number of species observed, estimated and generated by simulation". Acta Zoologica Academiae Scientiarum Hungaricae. 43 (3): 191–205.
- Papp, László; Izsák, János (1997). "Bimodality in Occurrence Classes: A Direct Consequence of Lognormal or Logarithmic Series Distribution of Abundances: A Numerical Experimentation". Oikos. 79 (1): 191–194. doi:10.2307/3546107. JSTOR 3546107.
- Soós, Á. & Papp, L. (eds): Catalogue of Palaearctic Diptera. Vol. 2 (1990), pp. 499, Vol. 3 (1988), pp. 448, Vol. 4 (1986), pp. 441, Vol. 5 (1988), pp. 446, Vol. 6 (1989), pp. 435, Vol. 7 (1991), pp. 291, Vol. 8 (1988), pp. 363, Vol. 9 (1984), pp. 460, Vol. 10 (1984), pp. 402, Vol. 11 (1986), pp. 265, Vol. 12 (1986), pp. 346. Akadémiai Kiadó, Budapest.
- Soós, Á. & Papp, L. (eds): Catalogue of Palaearctic Diptera. Vol. 1 (1992), pp. 520, Vol. 13 (1993), pp. 624. Hungarian Natural History Museum, Budapest.
- Papp, L. & Darvas, B. (eds): Contributions to a Manual of Palaearctic Diptera. 1: General and Applied Dipterology, 978 pp. (2000); 2: Nematocera and Lower Brachycera, 592 pp. (1997); 3: Higher Brachycera, 880 pp. (1998); Appendix Volume (2000). Science Herald, Budapest.
- Papp, L. (ed.) (2001) Checklist of the Diptera of Hungary Budapest: Hungarian Natural History Museum, 2001. - 550 p. ISBN 963 7093 710
- Papp, L.; Merz; Földvári, M. (2006). "Diptera of Thailand. A summary of the families and genera with references to the species representations". Acta Zoologica Academiae Scientiarum Hungaricae. 52 (2): 97–268.
- Papp, L., & Černý, M. Agromyzidae (Diptera) of Hungary. Vol. 1 (2015), Vol. 2 (2016), Vol. 3 (2017), Vol. 4 (2019), Pars Ltd, Nagykovácsi, Hungary.

== Sources ==
- A Magyar Tudományos Akadémia tagjai 1825–2002 II. (I–P). [Members of the Hungarian Academy of Sciences 1825–2002] chief editor: Ferenc Glatz. Budapest: MTA Társadalomkutató Központ. 2003. 974. p. [in Hungarian]
- Personal data page on the web site of HAS
