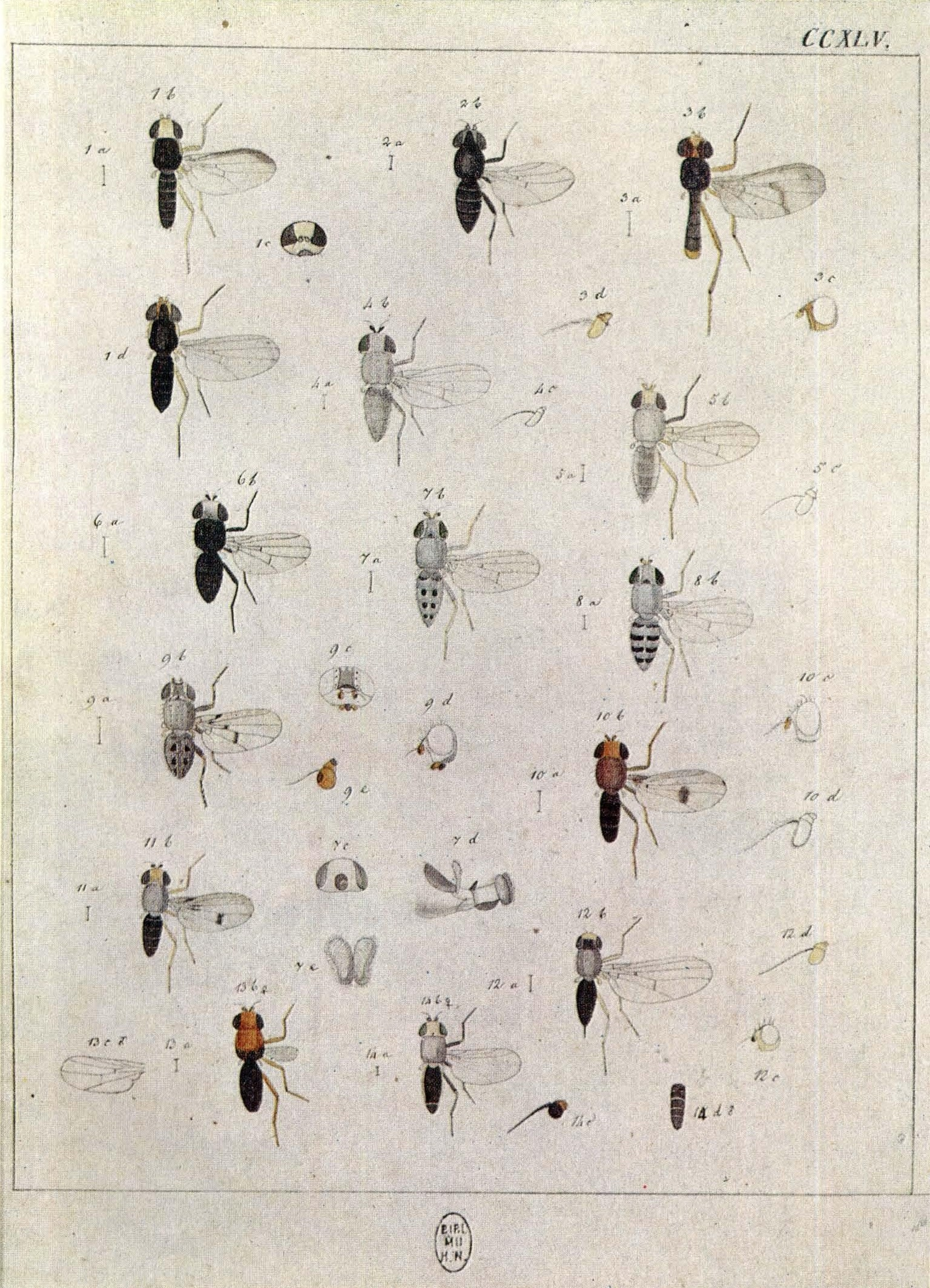
- Chamaemyia aridella (Fallen, 1823) figure in plate from Europäischen Zweiflügeligen (figure 4) see also 5 Ochthiphila nigrimana 6 Ochthiphila albiceps 7 Ochthiphila juncorum Fallen 8 Ochthiphila elegans Panzer, 1809

Scientific classification
- Domain: Eukaryota
- Kingdom: Animalia
- Phylum: Arthropoda
- Class: Insecta
- Order: Diptera
- Superfamily: Lauxanioidea
- Family: Chamaemyiidae; Hendel, 1916

= Chamaemyiidae =

Family of flies

The Chamaemyiidae are a small family of acalyptrate flies with less than 200 species described worldwide. The larvae of these small flies are active and predatory and are often used for biological control of aphids, scale insects, and similar pests. Chamaemyiid fossils are poorly represented in amber deposits, but a few examples are known from the Eocene epoch onwards.

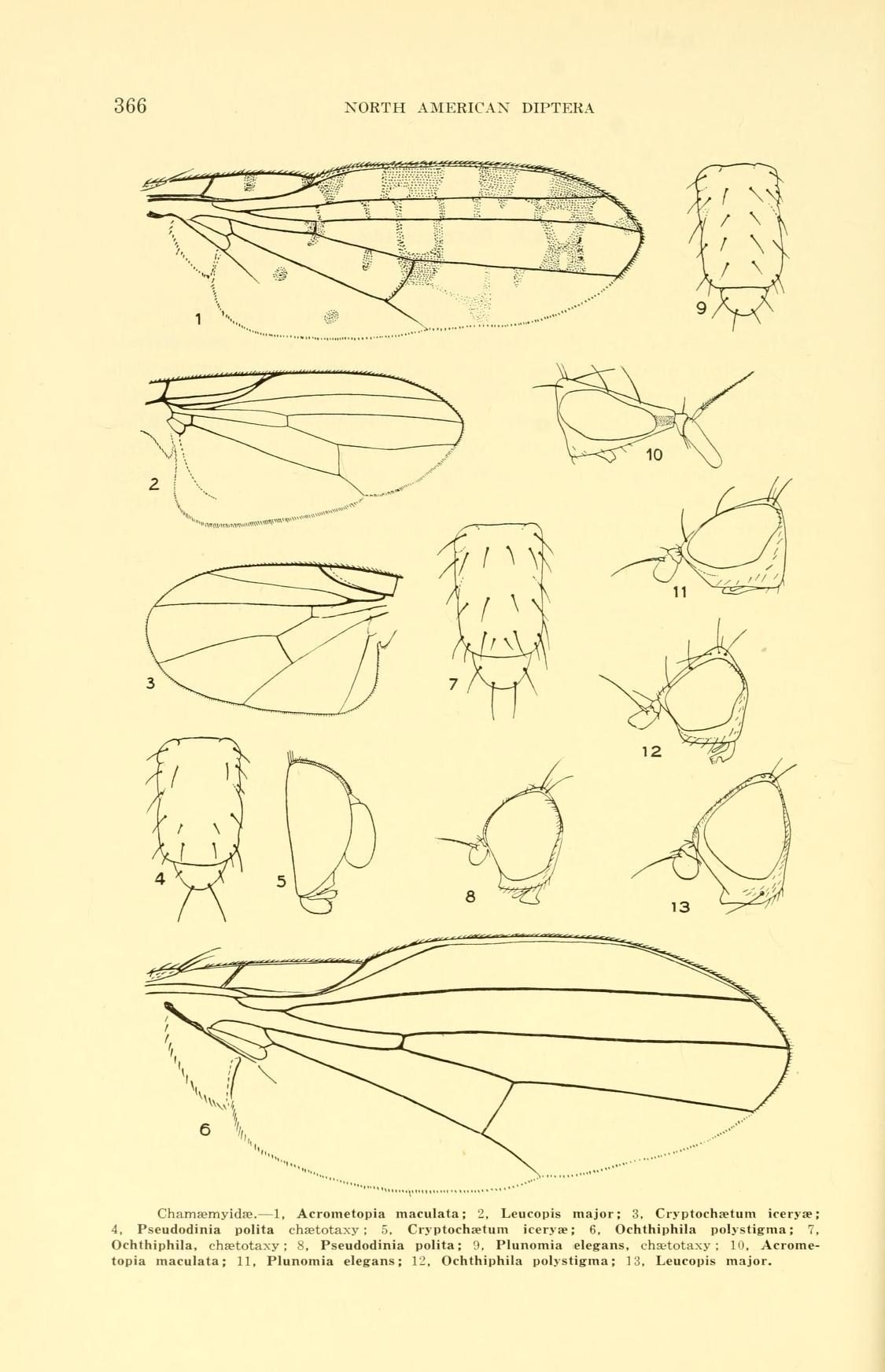
Morphological details of the Chamaemyiidae

== Description ==
For terms, see Morphology of Diptera
The Chamaemyiidae are small flies 9 (1–5 mm), usually greyish in colour. The frons is wide, with at most two pairs of bristles (often bare). The face is gently concave or strongly receding. Oral vibrissae are absent and the postvertical bristles are convergent or absent. The proboscis is short and the antennae are short. The mesonotum is with or without bristles. Prothoracic bristles are absent and with one sternopleural bristle. The mesopleura are usually bare, rarely setulose. The front femora bear bristles. The tibiae are without preapical bristles. Wings with the subcosta are entire, sometimes touching the first vein before its end. The anal vein does not reach nearly to the wing margin, the anal and second basal cells are always complete, and the costa is not broken. The abdomen is short or slightly elongated.

== Classification ==
- Subfamily Cremifaniinae
  - Genus Cremifania Czerny, 1904
- Subfamily Chamaemyiinae
  - Tribe Chamaemyiini
    - Genus Acrometopia Schiner, 1862
    - Genus Chamaeleucopis Gaimari, 2012
    - Genus Chamaemyia Meigen, 1803
    - Genus Hamecamyia Gaimari, 2001
    - Genus Melametopia Tanasijtshuk, 1992
    - Genus Melanochthiphila Frey, 1958
    - Genus Ortalidina Blanchard, 1852
    - Genus Parapamecia Cogan, 1978
    - Genus Parochthiphila Czerny, 1904
    - Genus Plunomia Curran, 1934
    - Genus Pseudoleucopis Malloch, 1925
    - Genus Pseudodinia Coquillett, 1902
  - Tribe Leucopini
    - Genus Anchioleucopis Tanasijtshuk, 1997
    - Genus Echinoleucopis Gaimari & Tanasijtshuk, 2001
    - Genus Leucopis Meigen, 1830
      - Subgenus Leucopis Meigen, 1830
      - Subgenus Leucopomyia Malloch, 1921
      - Subgenus Neoleucopis Malloch, 1921
      - Subgenus Xenoleucopis Malloch, 1933
    - Genus Leucopomyia Malloch, 1921
    - Genus Lipoleucopis de Meijere, 1928
    - Genus Neoleucopis Malloch, 1921
