= Ipecacuanha =

Ipecacuanha may refer to:

- a synonym of Carapichea, a genus of flowering plants in the family Rubiaceae
- the common name of Carapichea ipecacuanha, a species of flowering plant in the family Rubiaceae, the roots of which were used to make syrup of ipecac
- a fictional ship in H. G. Wells's The Island of Doctor Moreau

== See also ==
- Ruellia geminiflora, known locally as ipecacuanha-da-flor-roxa
- Solanum ipecacuanha, an obsolete name of Solanum pseudocapsicum, a nightshade species
- Asclepias curassavica, known as wild ipecacuanha
