= H. glaber =

H. glaber may refer to:

- Heterocephalus glaber, the naked mole rat, sand puppy or desert mole rat, a burrowing rodent species native to parts of East Africa
- Hylodes glaber, a frog species endemic to Brazil
- Hymenocoleus glaber, a plant species endemic to Cameroon

== See also ==
- Glaber (disambiguation)
