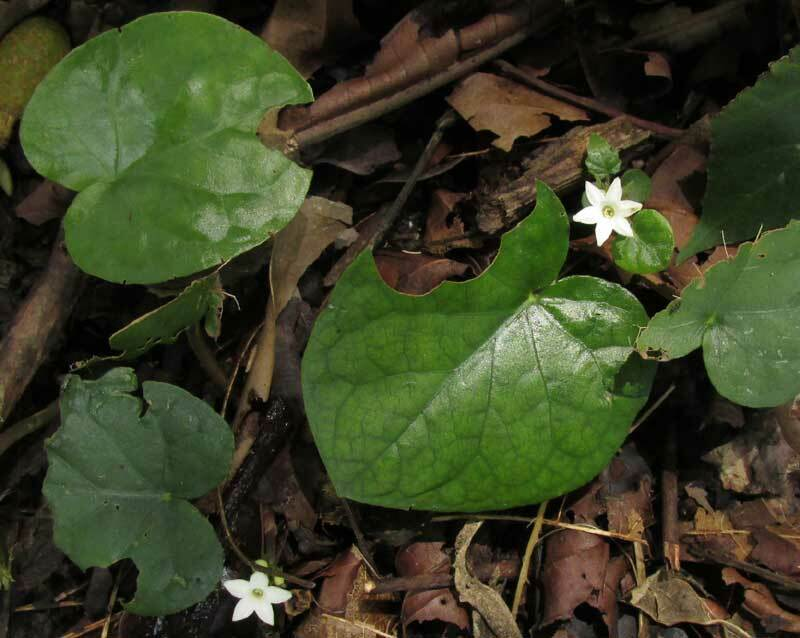
- Geophila macropoda flowers

Scientific classification
- Kingdom: Plantae
- Clade: Tracheophytes
- Clade: Angiosperms
- Clade: Eudicots
- Clade: Asterids
- Order: Gentianales
- Family: Rubiaceae
- Genus: Geophila
- Species: G. macropoda

Binomial name
- Geophila macropoda (Ruiz & Pav.) DC. (1830)

Synonyms
- Coccocypselum macropodum (Ruiz & Pav.) (1891); Psychotria macropoda Ruiz & Pav. (1799); Uragoga macropoda (Ruiz & Pav.) (1880); Cephaelis violifolia Kunth (1819); Geocardia violifolia (Kunth) Standl. (1914); Geophila herbacea var. violifolia (Kunth) Chodat & Hassl. (1904); Geophila repens var. violifolia (Kunth) Chodat & Hassl. (1904); Geophila violifolia (Kunth) DC. (1830); Psychotria cordifolia F.Dietr. (1807); Psychotria hederacea Humb. & Bonpl. ex Schult. (1819)

= Geophila macropoda =

Species of flowering plant

Geophila macropoda is a species of flowering plant belonging to the family Rubiaceae.

== Description ==
Geophila macropoda is a herbaceous and perennial plant with 1-4 leaves arising opposite one another at nodes along stems which creep along the ground, rooting at the nodes. Leaves are roundish with deeply lobed bases, and up to 9cm long (~3½ inches). Rabbit-ear shaped stipules grow at the bases of leaf petioles.

The species' few-flowered inflorescences are clustered in heads immediately beneath which there are two involucral bracts up to 3mm long (3/32 inch). Beneath the involucral bracts there's a peduncle about as long as the petioles; these grow considerably longer when fruits are ripening. Flowers within the clusters arise on very short pedicels. Corollas are white, shaped like funnels, and are hairy in their throats. Fruits are purplish black, roundish and drupe-type, with fleshy interiors, each drupe containing two "pit-" or "stone-type" seeds encased in hard coverings. The fruits are about 1cm (~½ inch) from top to bottom. Atop mature fruits there's a "calyx limb," a kind of slender crown consisting of sepals which don't fall off.

At least among Peruvian species of Geophila, Geophila macropoda is distinguished from other species by its nearly hairless body (short-hairy on young petioles), and leaf blades which are broadly rounded and heart-shaped.

== Distribution ==
The iNaturalist map of georeferenced records of Geophila macropoda indicate that the species occurs from southern Mexico south through Central America into northern and western South America south into southern Brazil and northern Argentina.

== Habitat ==
In Colombia, Geophila macropoda thrives as a cover weed in cacao plantations on alluvial soil in humid tropical climates. The greater the light intensity reaching the ground, the smaller and more chlorotic the leaves become. The species appears to not compete with the cacao in any way, while impeding growth of undesirable weed species. Its leaves and other parts eventually die and decompose, contributing to soil organic matter.

In the Ucayali region of Peru, at an elevation of 300-350m (~980-1150ft), it's described as occurring in secondary forests and occasionally flooded lands.

In Guatemala, the images on this page were taken along a trail in the shady forest of El Rosario National Park, the Parque Nacional El Rosario, in the department of Petén, at an elevation of 125m (410ft).

== Human uses ==
=== As a cover plant ===
Geophila macropoda is used as a living plant cover for various crops, including in cocoa plantations. It is managed to minimize the use of herbicides and other chemicals. Research on this practice carried out in the La Maná Canton in Ecuador indicated that the use of Geophila macropoda over a period of years caused an increase in soil organic matter, while pH did not change. Leaves of Geophila macropoda proved to be rich in the primary nutrients of nitrogen, phosphorus and potassium, plus microbiological results showed the bacterial population grew substantially.

=== Traditional medicine ===
Among the Huni Kuin people in the Peruvian Amazon, mouthwashes are made of Geophila macropoda -- mainly in the form of a decoction of the leaves -- to cure inflamed molars and abscesses of the gums.

Among the Yanesha people of the Peruvian Amazon rainforest, for fungal infections between the toes, the fresh plant is crushed and applied as a poultice to the infected area. Another recipe suggests preheating the leaves by wrapping them in another leaf and placing them over a flame. When the leaves are very hot, juice is squeezed over the infected area. The same people use the plant for pimples on children's bodies. They rub the body with the fresh plant for several days in a row until the pimples disappear.

== Taxonomy ==
Within the Rubiaceae, the genus Geophila is one of ten genera of the tribe Palicoureeae, and Geophila macropoda is one of 29 species of the genus Geophila. The type specimen of Geophila macropoda, given the name of Psychotria macropoda, was collected on a Botanical Expedition to the Viceroyalty of Peru in the Peruvian forest along the Pillao to Iscutuna tract ("Habitat in Peruviae nemoribu secùs Pillao ad Iscutunam tractum").

A 2014 study using DNA sequencing and phylogenetic analysis found that Geophila macropoda groups with G. cordifolia and G. tenuis.

== Etymology ==
In the genus Geophila the Geo- is from the Ancient Greek geo-, meaning "the earth, land, a land or country". The -phila is from the Greek philein, meaning "to love," so Geophila is a "ground lover."

The species name macropoda comes from the New Latin macropod-, meaning "big foot."

== Gallery ==
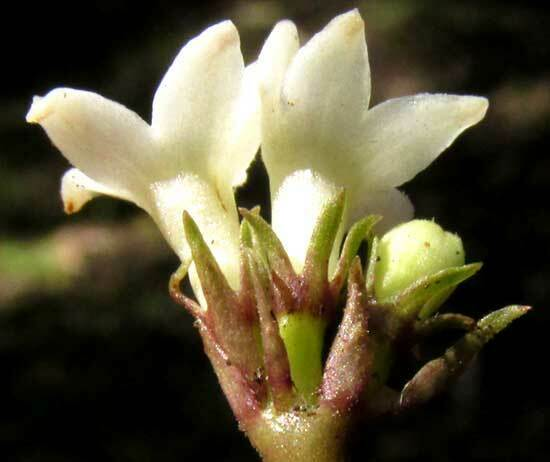
Geophila macropoda inflorescence

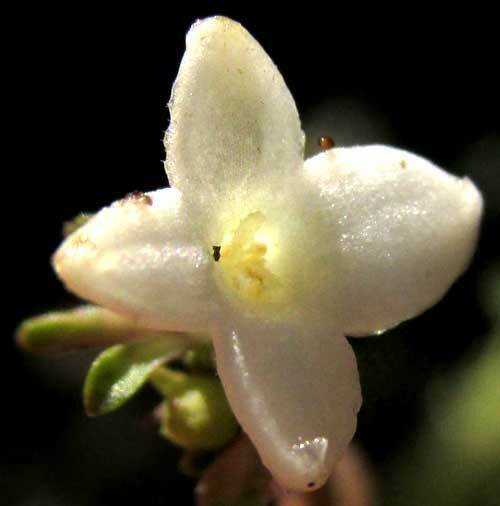
Geophila macropoda flower from above

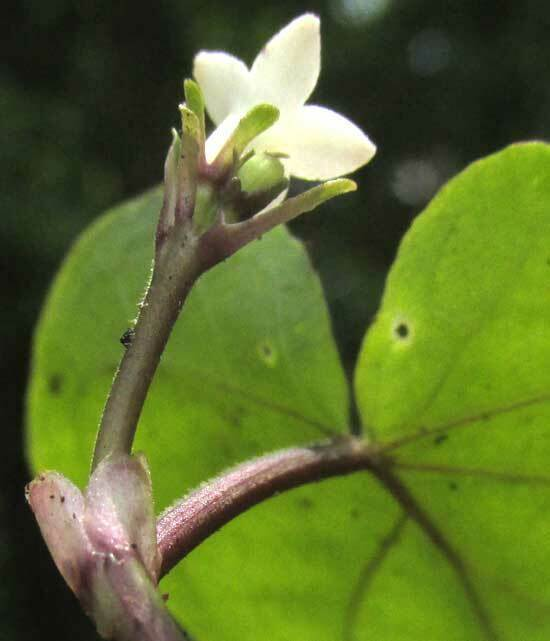
Geophila macropoda leaf base, petiole & pedunculate flowering head

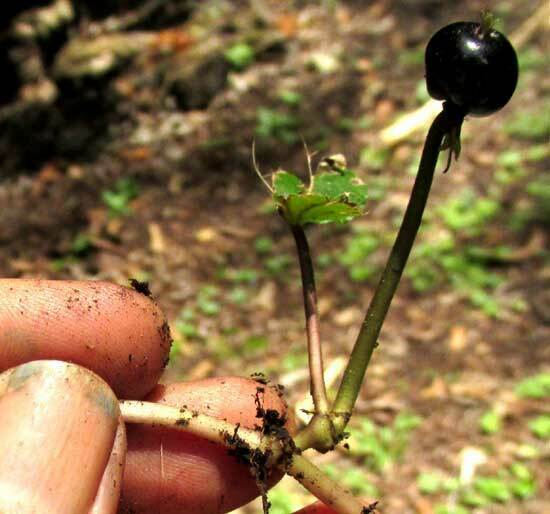
Geophila macropoda ripe drupe on peduncle

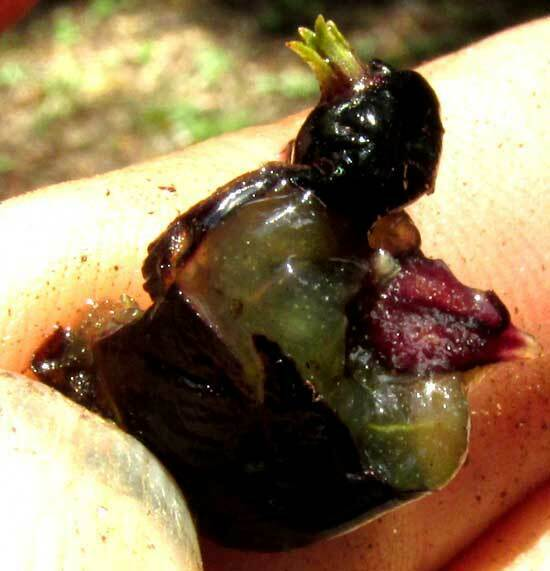
Geophila macropoda open drupe with fleshy interior

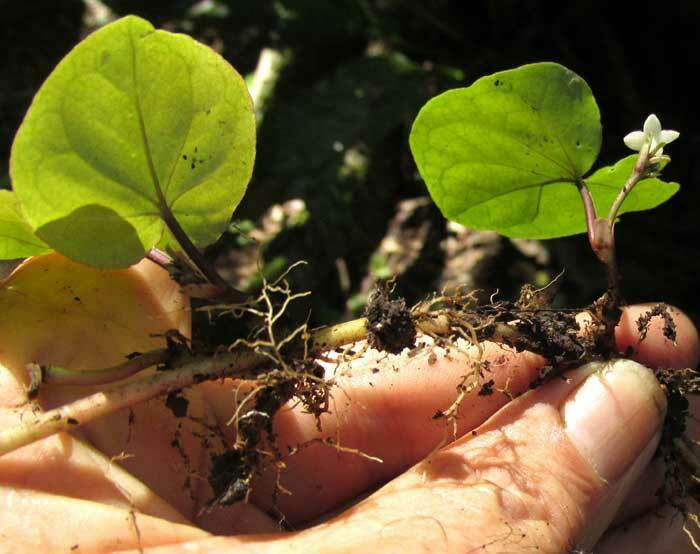
Geophila macropoda stem rooting at nodes, with leaves and flowers
