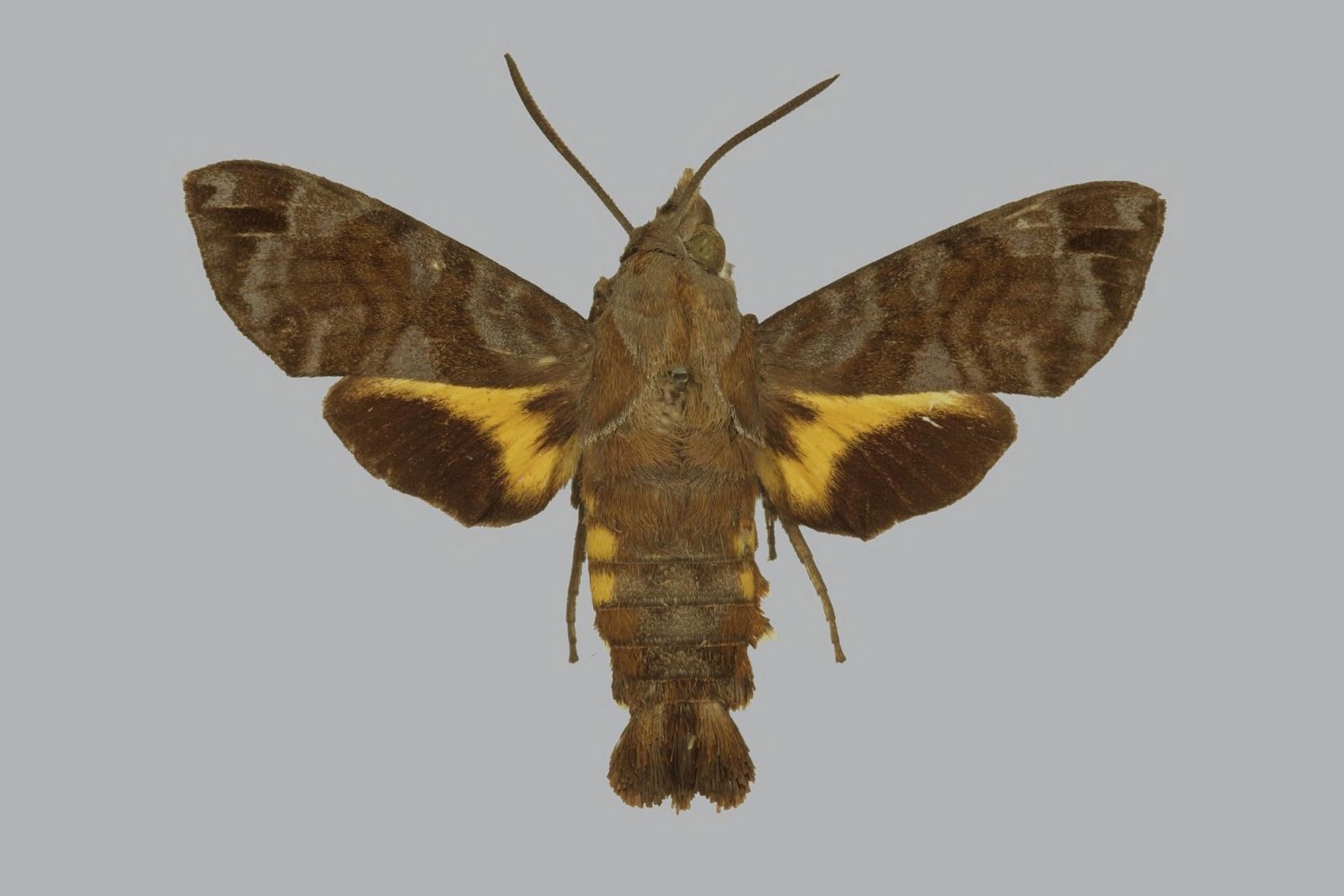
- Male museum specimen

Scientific classification
- Kingdom: Animalia
- Phylum: Arthropoda
- Class: Insecta
- Order: Lepidoptera
- Family: Sphingidae
- Genus: Macroglossum
- Species: M. vicinum

Binomial name
- Macroglossum vicinum Jordan, 1923

= Macroglossum vicinum =

Jordan's hummingbird hawkmoth

Species of moth

Macroglossum vicinum, or Jordan's hummingbird hawkmoth, is a moth of the family Sphingidae. It is known from southern India, southern China and Thailand.

The wingspan is 40–48 mm. It is a forest species which is on wing during the rainy season.

Larvae have been recorded feeding on Chassalia curviflora.

== Subspecies ==
- Macroglossum vicinum vicinum
- Macroglossum vicinum piepersi Dupont, 1941 (Thailand)
