= Notopleura =

Notopleura may refer to:

- Notopleura (plant), a genus of Neotropical plants in the family Rubiaceae
- Notopleura (grasshopper), a genus of North African, Eremogrylline grasshoppers
- Data related to Notopleura at Wikispecies
