= L. glaber =

L. glaber may refer to:

- Lithocarpus glaber, a tree species found in Japan
- Lotus glaber, the narrow-leaf bird's-foot trefoil, a flowering plant species native to western and southern Europe and southwest Asia

== See also ==
- Glaber (disambiguation)
