= O. glaber =

O. glaber may refer to:

- Ochetellus glaber, the black house ant, an ant species
- Oxychilus glaber, an air-breathing land snail species found in the Czech Republic

== See also ==
- Glaber (disambiguation)
