= Thomas Dover =

English physician and privateer

Thomas Dover (1660–1742), sometimes referred to as "Doctor Quicksilver", was an English physician. He is remembered for his common cold and fever medicine Dover's powder, his work with the poor in Bristol, and his privateering voyage alongside William Dampier and Woodes Rogers that rescued castaway Alexander Selkirk, the real-life inspiration for Robinson Crusoe.

== Early life and education ==
Thomas Dover was born in Barton-on-the-Heath in 1660, into what historians have called a "distinguished but rebellious" family. His great-grandfather William Cole had been president of Corpus Christi College, Oxford during the reign of Mary I of England but was expelled for displaying Protestant sympathies. Briefly reinstated during the reign of Elizabeth I, he was again expelled after being found guilty of fraud. Thomas's paternal grandfather Robert Dover was a lawyer and poet who moved the family to Saintbury, near Chipping Campden, where he founded and presided over the Cotswold Olimpick Games from 1612 until around 1650. His son John Dover served as a Royalist cavalry captain during the English Civil War; defeated, he retired as a gentleman farmer at Barton-on-the Heath, where Thomas was born.

Thomas was one of eight children. It is likely that he attended Chipping Campden Grammar School, and in 1680 was admitted into Magdalen Hall at the University of Oxford, receiving a Bachelor of Arts degree in 1684. Two years later he was admitted to Gonville and Caius College, Cambridge where he studied medicine and was apprenticed to the physician Thomas Sydenham. While in Sydenham's clinic Dover contracted smallpox and was treated via the unusual regimen of blood-letting and a daily diet of twelve bottles of beer laced with vitriol. The treatment was successful and Dover returned to his studies, graduating as a Bachelor of Medicine in 1687.

== Career ==
He studied medicine under Thomas Sydenham in Pall Mall, London. During this time, he contracted smallpox and was treated with the "cooling method" by Sydenham, described by Dover in his 1732 book Ancient Physician's Legacy to his Country:

"I had no fire allowed in my room, my windows were constantly open, my bedclothes were ordered to be laid no higher than my waist. He made me take twelve bottles of small beer, acidulated with spirit of vitriol, every twenty-four hours."

Dover married in 1681 and soon returned to Barton-on-the-Heath when his father became ill, taking care of the farm and working as a country practitioner. When his father died in 1696, Dover moved to Bristol, where he set up his own practice and worked with the Bristol Corporation of the Poor as an honorary physician at St. Peter's Hospital. There, he assisted the "Guardians of the Poor" with their poor relief efforts, becoming the first medical practitioner to offer services to the organisation.

Dover's own practice proved very lucrative. Bristol was a large city with very few physicians and many wealthy merchants and tradesmen. The spread of typhus added to his client list and meant that Dover was seeing up to 25 patients a day. He was soon able to afford his first house in the fashionable Queen Square, home also to Woodes Rogers, a sea captain with whom Dover would embark on a new career.

=== Privateering expedition ===
In 1702, Dover took a trip to the West Indies. This adventure clearly resonated with him; and, in the following years, he organised a more permanent career change. In 1708, William Dampier arrived in Bristol hoping to secure a new privateer mission to capture a Spanish treasure ship. Dover bought into the plan, becoming part owner and second captain of the Duke, a privateer under the command of Rogers. The doctor was styled "Captain Dover", having contributed £3,312 to the voyage, the second largest amount of thirty investors. Alongside this responsibility, Dover was given the role of president of the expedition council, allowing him two votes in all debates. There were four surgeons, and he had no medical charge, but would need his skills later in the voyage.

On 1 August 1708, the Duke set sail alongside the Duchess on a privateering voyage. On 2 February 1709, a light was seen on the Juan Fernández Islands, and Dover led a landing party to investigate its source. They discovered a fire lit by Alexander Selkirk, a Scottish sailor left on the island in 1705 because he considered the ship he was aboard, the Cinque Ports, as not being seaworthy. The Cinque Ports was part of an expedition led by Dampier, which stopped for supplies at the archipelago. Selkirk's beliefs proved to be well founded; the ship sank one month later with few survivors. His four-year stay on the island and eventual rescue were the inspiration for the novel Robinson Crusoe written by Daniel Defoe, a friend of Woodes Rogers.

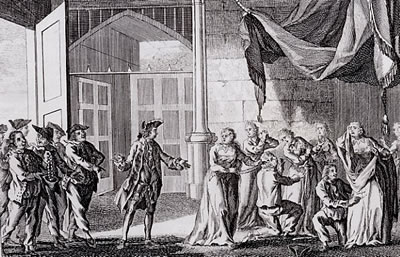
A depiction of the landing party in Guayaquil, searching Spanish ladies for their jewels

In April 1709 Dover led a landing party with entirely different intentions. The two ships encountered the city of Guayaquil in what is now Ecuador, and a raiding party was sent in. Dover's command was successful, and only two members of the crew were lost in the attack. However, around 180 of those on the ships became extremely ill after digging up the town's graves in search of items of value. Dover returned to his medical roots and directed the surgeons in their work, ordering them to bleed the ill in both arms and to give them a diluted sulphuric acid drink. This regimen proved successful, and only a handful of sailors died.

At one point during the voyage, the ships visited Java, where Dover would sell the Marquis, a captured ship, to Captain Opie. Opie would cross paths with Dover again later in life when he met and married Dover's daughter. The voyage was coming to an end when the privateers captured another prize whose captaincy was, after a heated debate amongst the council members, given to Dover.

The three-year expedition arrived home, and the prizes were shared out between the investors. Dover received a total of £6,689 (worth about £1,193,900 today), more than enough to secure a high position in society. The privateers had been labelled as pirates, but the enactment of The Prize Act in 1708 gave legal backing to their actions. However, he was not yet ready to settle and embarked on a holiday across Europe.

=== Return to medicine ===
Dover re-established himself as a physician in Bristol before moving to Strand, London in 1720. Around this time his wife died and he lost most of his fortune due to bad investments including as much as £6,000 in the collapse of the South Sea Company. In 1721 he was successful in his application to join the Royal College of Physicians. His past experience of contracting smallpox and the care he received from Sydenham suddenly became particularly relevant when there was an outbreak in London, with Dover successfully replicating the "cooling method".

In 1729 he returned briefly to Bristol, spending much of his time writing a book that would become both successful and controversial. The Ancient Physician's Legacy to his Country was first published in 1732 after Dover had returned to London. He saw patients at the popular Jerusalem coffee house.

Dover's medical book was aimed at the education of physicians and the general public. He gives descriptions of around 120 diseases, writing from his experiences and detailing his adventures as though the book were a travelogue. Though he shows some degree of wisdom regarding pharmacology, his knowledge of medicine is described as being small while his descriptions of some diseases are presented in the "flimsiest fashion" and "outrageous inaccuracies are set down with no little dogmatism". Dover also makes many accusations of prejudice within the College of Physicians and writes several denigrating comments about his colleagues in general.

From his assertions in this book Dover acquired the nickname "Doctor Quicksilver". His recommendation of mercury (sometimes called quicksilver) as a cure for numerous ills was challenged by several detractors. However, the popularity of the book and the forcefulness of Dover's character ensured that the use of mercury would be in vogue for many years. One anonymous report in 1733 challenges the use of the liquid metal as a cure for syphilis and starts hinting towards mercury poisoning:

"A young gentleman ... had the venereal disease caused by fast living. Dr Dover ordered the young gentleman to take crude mercury. At first he improved but later the patient had a violent dysentery which made an end of all his complaints and his life also".

The book was republished several times with the eighth and final edition being released twenty years after Dover's death. It was also translated into French. The lasting contribution from within its pages is Dover's powder, first recommended for its analgesic (painkilling) properties and then for its use as a diaphoretic (induces perspiration). The combination of opium, ipecacuanha, and potassium sulphate (later liquorice) was over time adjusted in the constituent quantities but was in use for over 200 years.

== Retirement and death ==
Dover's successes with his book and his powder helped to bring him back to financial solvency. In 1736 he moved into a house in Arundel Street with friend Robert Tracy, finally retiring in his eighties. He died there in 1742. Dover was buried in Stanway, Gloucestershire in the Tracy family vault. Glenside Hospital museum maintains an exhibition about Dover.
