= Palicoureeae =

Scientific classification
- Kingdom: Plantae
- Clade: Tracheophytes
- Clade: Angiosperms
- Clade: Eudicots
- Clade: Asterids
- Order: Gentianales
- Family: Rubiaceae
- Subfamily: Rubioideae
- Tribe: Palicoureeae; Robbr. & Manen

Type genus
- Palicourea Aubl.

Tribe of plants

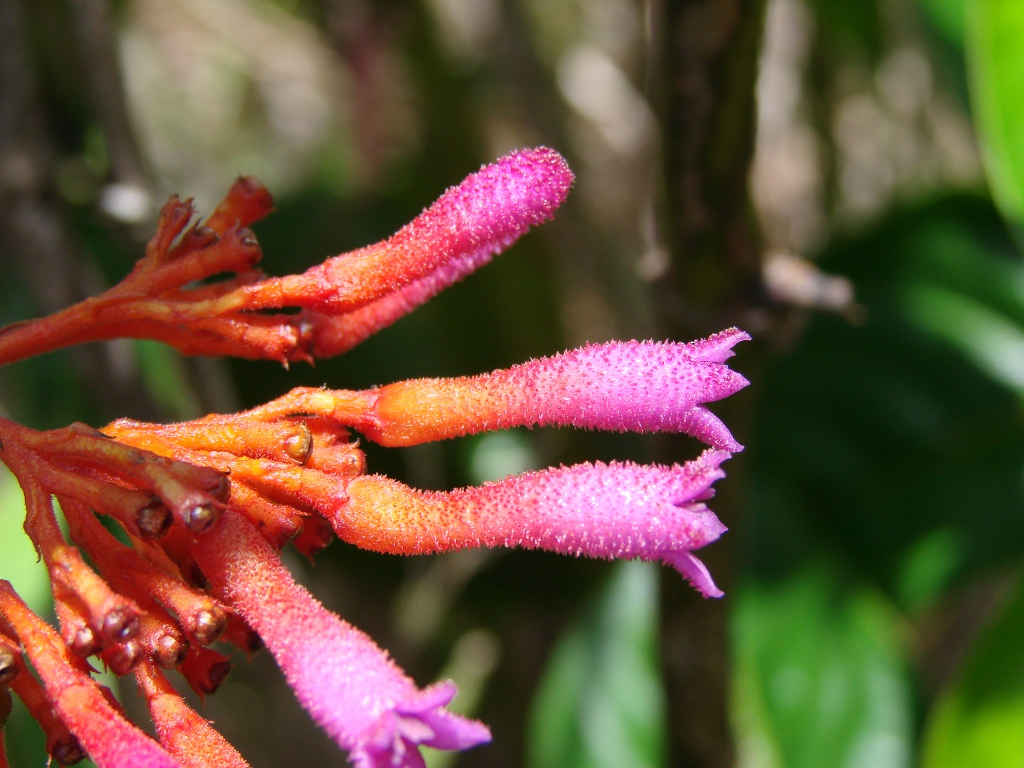
Palicourea marcgravii is a flowering plant in the rubiaceae family

Palicoureeae is a tribe of flowering plants in the family Rubiaceae and contains about 817 species in 11 genera. Its representatives are found in the tropics and subtropics.

== Genera ==
Currently accepted names

- Carapichea Aubl. (23 sp.)
- Chassalia Comm. ex Poir. (114 sp.)
- Chazaliella E.M.A.Petit & Verdc. (20 sp.)
- Eumachia D.C.
- Geophila D.Don (29 sp.)
- Hymenocoleus Robbr. (12 sp.)
- Margaritopsis C.Wright (27 sp.)
- Notopleura (Hook.f.) Bremek. (100 sp.)
- Palicourea Aubl. (358 sp.)
- Puffia Razafim. & B.Bremer (1 sp.)
- Rudgea Salisb. (131 sp.)

Synonyms

- Carinta W.Wight = Geophila
- Ceratites Sol. ex Miers = Rudgea
- Chytropsia Bremek. = Margaritopsis
- Colladonia Spreng. = Palicourea
- Geocardia Standl. = Geophila
- Gloneria André = Rudgea
- Ipecacuanha Raf. = Carapichea
- Margaris Griseb. = Margaritopsis
- Montamans Dwyer = Notopleura
- Nettlera Raf. = Carapichea
- Nonatelia Aubl. = Palicourea
- Oribasia Schreb. = Palicourea
- Pachysanthus C.Presl = Rudgea
- Proscephaleium Korth. = Chassalia
- Readea Gillespie = Eumachia
- Rhodostoma Schweidw. = Palicourea
- Stachyococcus Standl. = Carapichea
- Stephanium Schreb. = Palicourea
- Strempelia A.Rich. ex DC. = Rudgea
- Viscoides Jacq. = Notopleura
- Zwaardekronia Korth. = Chassalia
