= Dover's powder =

Traditional medicine against cold and fever

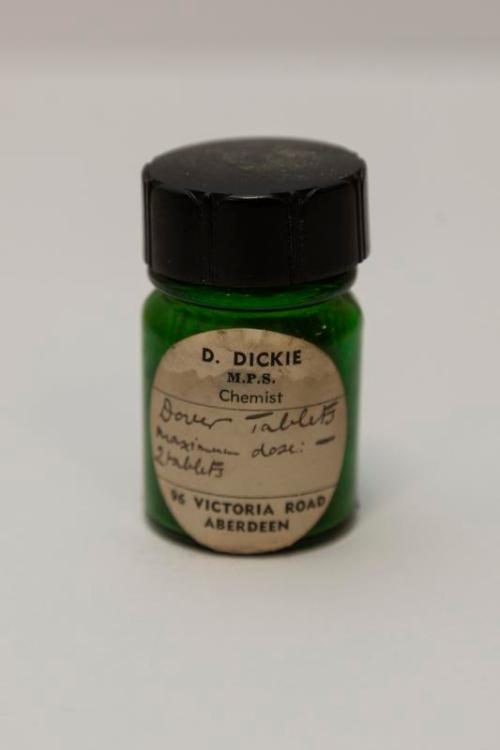
Dover Tablets from a ship's medicine chest

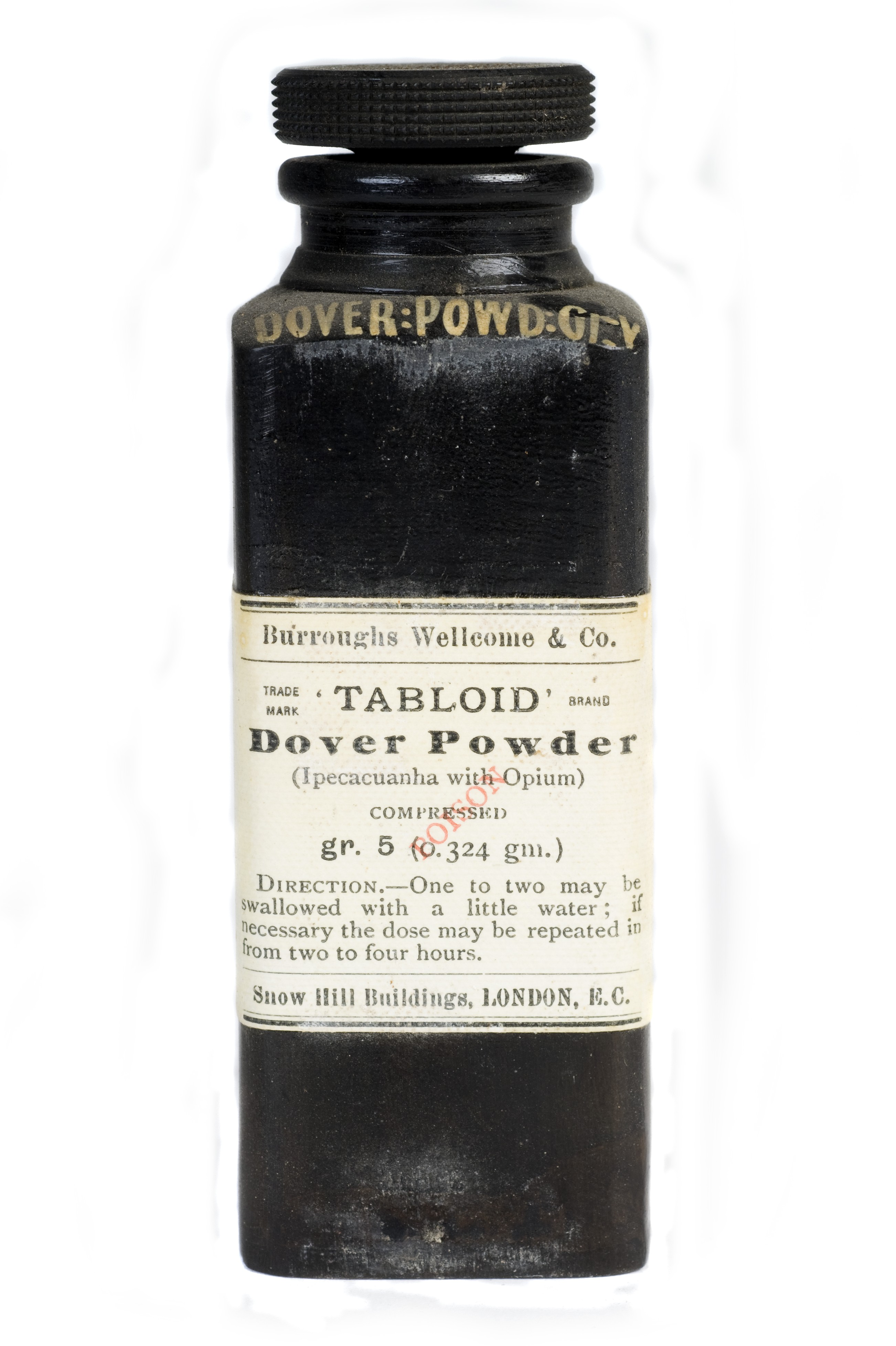
Bottle of 'Dover Powder' from the medicine chest supplied by Burroughs Wellcome & Co., which accompanied Britain's 1901 National Antarctic Expedition

Dover's powder (a.k.a. pulvis ipecacuanhae et opii) was a medicine against cold and fever.

Developed in 1732 by English physician Thomas Dover, the powder was an old preparation of powder of ipecacuanha (which was formerly used to produce syrup of ipecac), opium in powder, and potassium sulfate. Initially designed to treat gout, it was later recommended for general pains, insomnia, and diarrhea, among others.

The powder was largely used in domestic practice to induce sweating, to defeat the advance of a common cold, and at the beginning of any attack of fever.

It is no longer in use in modern medicine, but remained reputable until about the 1930s. Its inclusion of opium, an addictive substance, led to its discontinuation of use. Dover's powder was banned in India in 1994.

== Contents ==
A 1958 source describes Dover's Powder as follows: "Powder of Ipecacuanha and Opium (B.P., Egyp. P., Ind. P.). Pulv. Ipecac. et Opii; Ipecac and Opium Powder (U.S.N.F.); Dover's Powder; Compound Ipecacuanha Powder. Prepared ipecacuanha, 10 g., powdered opium 10 g., lactose 80 g. It contains 1% of anhydrous morphine. Dose: 320 to 640 mg. (5 to 10 grains). Many foreign pharmacies include a similar powder, sometimes with potassium sulphate or with equal parts of potassium nitrate and potassium sulphate in place of lactose; max. single dose 1 to 1.5 g. and max. in 24 hours 4 to 6 g."

=== Usage ===
To obtain the greatest benefits from its use as a sudorific, it was recommended that copious drafts of some warm and harmless drink be ingested after the use of the powder.

It was an ingredient in John Wyeth & Brother, Inc.'s La Grippe (flu) pills, circa 1906.

== In popular culture ==
Dover's powder was part of a joke published in The Science of Health in 1875 and reprinted in Godey's Lady's Book the same year. The joke illustrates its status as a typical medicine for a tumor:

An old lady in Jefferson County acquired the habit of using morphia for relief from the pains of a tumor. Her family vainly dissuaded her, and at last united in deceiving her by substituting carefully prepared potato starch in morphia bottles. She used this article for fifteen years until the day of her death, often complaining that it was an inferior article, though her physician declared it all right. He gave her Dover's powders once during an illness, but she could not rest until she took some of the starch morphia.
