= Eumachia lepiniana =

Conservation status
- Vulnerable (IUCN 2.3)

Scientific classification
- Kingdom: Plantae
- Clade: Embryophytes
- Clade: Tracheophytes
- Clade: Angiosperms
- Clade: Eudicots
- Clade: Asterids
- Order: Gentianales
- Family: Rubiaceae
- Genus: Eumachia
- Species: E. lepiniana

Binomial name
- Eumachia lepiniana (Baill. ex Drake) Barrabé, C.M.Taylor & Razafim. (2017)

Synonyms
- Psychotria cernua Nadeaud (1873); Psychotria lepiniana (Baill. ex Drake) Drake (1890); Uragoga lepiniana Baill. ex Drake (1886)

Species of plant

Eumachia lepiniana is a species of flowering plant in the family Rubiaceae. It is a shrub or tree endemic to the island of Tahiti in the Society Islands of French Polynesia.
