= Rudgea stenophylla =

Conservation status
- Vulnerable (IUCN 2.3)

Scientific classification
- Kingdom: Plantae
- Clade: Tracheophytes
- Clade: Angiosperms
- Clade: Eudicots
- Clade: Asterids
- Order: Gentianales
- Family: Rubiaceae
- Genus: Rudgea
- Species: R. stenophylla

Binomial name
- Rudgea stenophylla (K.Krause) Standl.

Synonyms
- Palicourea stenophylla K.Krause; Faramea persistisepta Dwyer & M.V.Hayden

Species of plant

Rudgea stenophylla is a species of flowering plant in the family Rubiaceae. It is endemic to Peru.
