= Cephaeline =

Names
- IUPAC name 7′,10,11-Trimethoxyemetan-6′-ol
- Systematic IUPAC name (1R)-1-{[(2S,3R,11bS)-3-Ethyl-9,10-dimethoxy-1,3,4,6,7,11b-hexahydro-2H-pyrido[2,1-a]isoquinolin-2-yl]methyl}-7-methoxy-1,2,3,4-tetrahydroisoquinolin-6-ol
- Other names Cepheline; Desmethylemetine; Dihydropsychotrine

Identifiers
CAS Number	483-17-0
3D model (JSmol)	Interactive image
ChEMBL	ChEMBL255708
ChemSpider	390702
ECHA InfoCard	100.006.902
KEGG	C09390
PubChem CID	442195
UNII	QA971541A1
CompTox Dashboard (EPA)	DTXSID501016520
- InChI: InChI=1S/C28H38N2O4/c1-5-17-16-30-9-7-19-13-27(33-3)28(34-4)15-22(19)24(30)11-20(17)10-23-21-14-26(32-2)25(31)12-18(21)6-8-29-23/h12-15,17,20,23-24,29,31H,5-11,16H2,1-4H3/t17-,20-,23+,24-/m0/s1 Key: DTGZHCFJNDAHEN-OZEXIGSWSA-N
- SMILES: CC[C@H]1CN2CCc3cc(c(cc3[C@@H]2C[C@@H]1C[C@@H]4c5cc(c(cc5CCN4)O)OC)OC)OC

Properties
Chemical formula	C_{28}H_{38}N_{2}O_{4}
Molar mass	466.622 g·mol^{−1}
Appearance	White silky crystals
Solubility in ethanol	Soluble

Hazards
- Occupational safety and health (OHS/OSH)
Main hazards	Emetic / poisonous
- Except where otherwise noted, data are given for materials in their standard state (at 25 °C [77 °F], 100 kPa). verify (what is ?) Infobox references

Cephaeline is an alkaloid that is found in Cephaelis ipecacuanha and other plant species including Psychotria acuminata. Cephaeline induces vomiting by stimulating the stomach lining and is found in commercial products such as syrup of ipecac. Chemically, it is closely related to emetine.

== Poison treatment ==
Cephaeline in the form of syrup of ipecac was once commonly recommended as an emergency treatment for accidental poisoning, but its use has been phased out due to its ineffectiveness.
