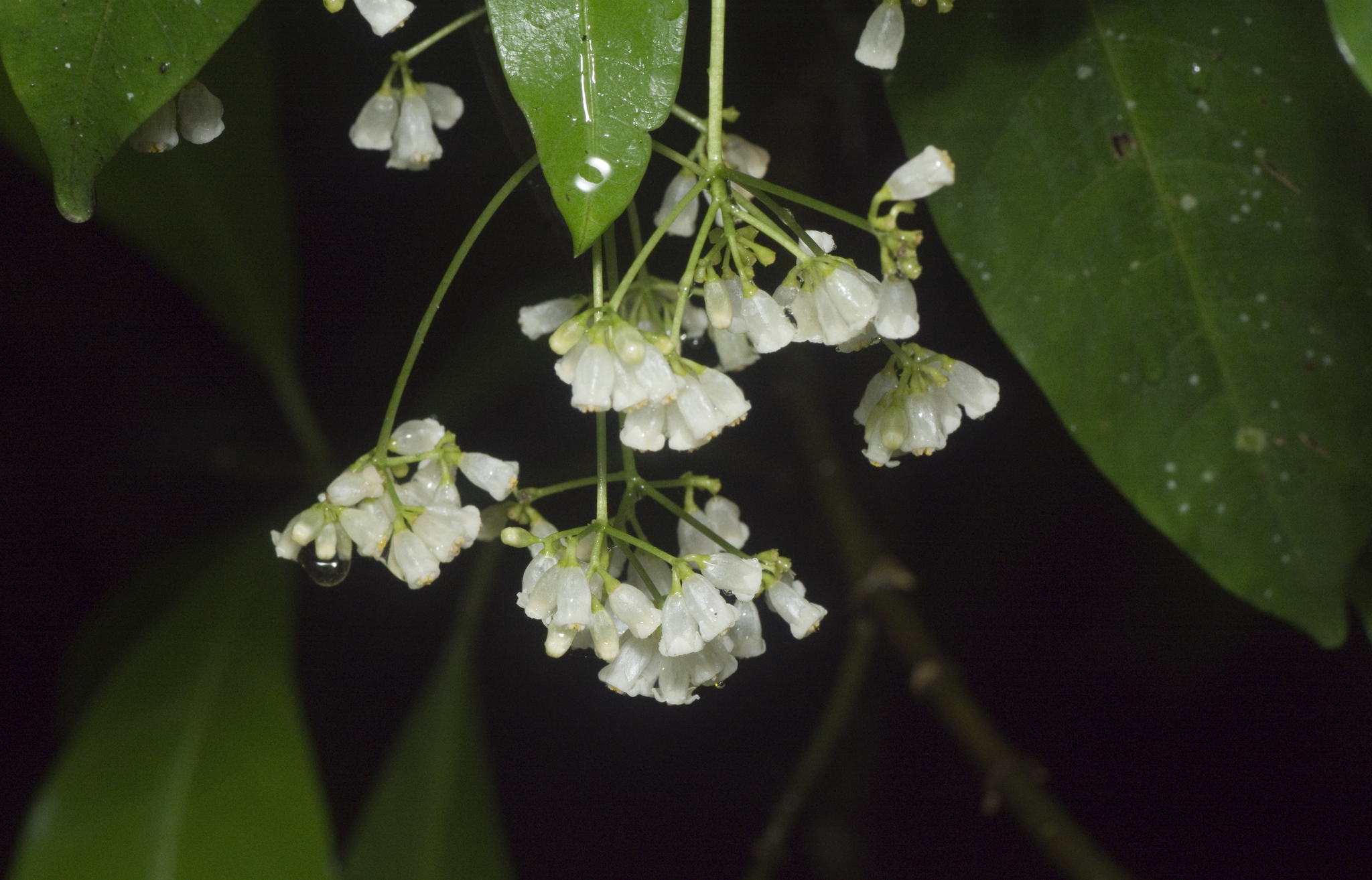
- Eumachia frutescens

Scientific classification
- Kingdom: Plantae
- Clade: Tracheophytes
- Clade: Angiosperms
- Clade: Eudicots
- Clade: Asterids
- Order: Gentianales
- Family: Rubiaceae
- Subfamily: Rubioideae
- Tribe: Palicoureeae
- Genus: Eumachia; D.C.

Species
- See text.

Synonyms
- Geodorum esquirolii Schltr.; Chazaliella E.M.A.Petit & Verdc.; Chytropsia Bremek.; Margaris Griseb., nom. illeg.; Margaritopsis C.Wright; Readea Gillespie

= Eumachia (plant) =

Genus of plants

Eumachia is a genus of flowering plant in the family Rubiaceae. Its species are native to tropical and subtropical regions worldwide. The genus was established by Augustin Pyramus de Candolle in 1830.

== Species ==
As of January 2023, Plants of the World Online accepted the following species:

- Eumachia abrupta (Hiern) J.H.Kirkbr.
- Eumachia acuifolia Delprete & J.H.Kirkbr.
- Eumachia agustinae (Acuña) C.M.Taylor & Razafim.
- Eumachia albert-smithii (Standl.) Delprete & J.H.Kirkbr.
- Eumachia amoena (A.C.Sm.) Barrabé, C.M.Taylor & Razafim.
- Eumachia aneityensis (Guillaumin) Barrabé, C.M.Taylor & Razafim.
- Eumachia archboldiana (Fosberg) Barrabé, C.M.Taylor & Razafim.
- Eumachia astrellantha (Wernham) Delprete & J.H.Kirkbr.
- Eumachia balabacensis (Merr.) Barrabé, C.M.Taylor & Razafim.
- Eumachia boliviana (Standl.) Delprete & J.H.Kirkbr.
- Eumachia carnea (G.Forst.) DC.
- Eumachia cephalantha (Müll.Arg.) Delprete & J.H.Kirkbr.
- Eumachia chaenotricha (DC.) C.M.Taylor & Razafim.
- Eumachia chlorocalyx (K.Schum.) Barrabé, C.M.Taylor & Razafim.
- Eumachia coffeosperma (K.Schum.) Razafim. & C.M.Taylor
- Eumachia collina (Labill.) Barrabé, C.M.Taylor & Razafim.
- Eumachia cupulicalyx (Verdc.) Razafim. & C.M.Taylor
- Eumachia cymuligera (Müll.Arg.) C.M.Taylor & Razafim.
- Eumachia damasiana (Sohmer) Barrabé, C.M.Taylor & Razafim.
- Eumachia deinocalyx (Sandwith) Delprete & J.H.Kirkbr.
- Eumachia depauperata (Müll.Arg.) M.R.V.Barbosa & M.S.Pereira
- Eumachia domatiicola (De Wild.) Razafim. & C.M.Taylor
- Eumachia evansensis (A.C.Sm.) Barrabé, C.M.Taylor & Razafim.
- Eumachia extensa (Miq.) I.M.Turner
- Eumachia forsteriana (A.Gray) Barrabé, C.M.Taylor & Razafim.
- Eumachia frutescens (C.T.White) Barrabé, C.M.Taylor & Razafim.
- Eumachia galorei (Sohmer) Barrabé, C.M.Taylor & Razafim.
- Eumachia geminodens (K.Schum.) Barrabé, C.M.Taylor & Razafim.
- Eumachia goodenoughiensis (Sohmer) Barrabé, C.M.Taylor & Razafim.
- Eumachia gossweileri (Cavaco) Razafim. & C.M.Taylor
- Eumachia guianensis (Bremek.) Delprete & J.H.Kirkbr.
- Eumachia haematocarpa (Standl.) C.M.Taylor & Razafim.
- Eumachia hassleriana (Chodat) C.M.Taylor & Razafim.
- Eumachia horsfieldiana (Miq.) Barrabé, C.M.Taylor & Razafim.
- Eumachia huallagae (Standl.) C.M.Taylor & Razafim.
- Eumachia impatiens (Dwyer) C.M.Taylor & Razafim.
- Eumachia inaequifolia (Müll.Arg.) C.M.Taylor & Razafim.
- Eumachia incompta (A.C.Sm.) Barrabé, C.M.Taylor & Razafim.
- Eumachia inconspicua (C.M.Taylor) C.M.Taylor & Razafim.
- Eumachia insidens (Hiern) Razafim. & C.M.Taylor
- Eumachia kappleri (Miq.) Delprete & J.H.Kirkbr.
- Eumachia lanceifolia (Urb.) C.M.Taylor & Razafim.
- Eumachia lepiniana (Baill. ex Drake) Barrabé, C.M.Taylor & Razafim.
- Eumachia leptothyrsa (Miq.) Barrabé, C.M.Taylor & Razafim.
- Eumachia letouzeyi (Robbr.) Razafim. & C.M.Taylor
- Eumachia longistylis (Hiern) Razafim. & C.M.Taylor
- Eumachia lophoclada (Hiern) Razafim. & C.M.Taylor
- Eumachia lyciiflora (Baill.) Barrabé, C.M.Taylor & Razafim.
- Eumachia macrocarpa (Verdc.) Razafim. & C.M.Taylor
- Eumachia membranacea (Gillespie) Delprete & J.H.Kirkbr.
- Eumachia membranifolia (Bartl. ex DC.) Barrabé, C.M.Taylor & Razafim.
- Eumachia merrilliana (Sohmer) Barrabé, C.M.Taylor & Razafim.
- Eumachia microdon (DC.) Delprete & J.H.Kirkbr.
- Eumachia monopedicellata (Sohmer) Barrabé, C.M.Taylor & Razafim.
- Eumachia montana (Blume) I.M.Turner
- Eumachia nana (K.Krause) Delprete & J.H.Kirkbr.
- Eumachia novohiberiensis (Sohmer) Barrabé, C.M.Taylor & Razafim.
- Eumachia nutans (Sw.) C.M.Taylor & Razafim.
- Eumachia obanensis (Wernham) Razafim. & C.M.Taylor
- Eumachia obovoidea (Verdc.) Razafim. & C.M.Taylor
- Eumachia oddonii (De Wild.) Razafim. & C.M.Taylor
- Eumachia oleoides (Baill.) Barrabé, C.M.Taylor & Razafim.
- Eumachia oncocarpa (K.Schum.) Barrabé, C.M.Taylor & Razafim.
- Eumachia ovoidea (Pierre ex Pit.) Barrabé, C.M.Taylor & Razafim.
- Eumachia pallidinervia (Steyerm.) Delprete & J.H.Kirkbr.
- Eumachia parviflora (R.D.Good) Razafim. & C.M.Taylor
- Eumachia paupertina (Standl. & Steyerm.) Delprete & J.H.Kirkbr.
- Eumachia podocephala (Müll.Arg.) Delprete & J.H.Kirkbr.
- Eumachia poggei (K.Schum.) Razafim. & C.M.Taylor
- Eumachia purariensis (Sohmer) Barrabé, C.M.Taylor & Razafim.
- Eumachia ramisulca (Verdc.) Razafim. & C.M.Taylor
- Eumachia rostrata (Blume) I.M.Turner
- Eumachia rotundifolia (R.D.Good) Razafim. & C.M.Taylor
- Eumachia saidoriensis (Sohmer) Barrabé, C.M.Taylor & Razafim.
- Eumachia samoana (K.Schum.) Barrabé, C.M.Taylor & Razafim.
- Eumachia savaiiensis (Rech.) Barrabé, C.M.Taylor & Razafim.
- Eumachia schmielei (Warb.) Barrabé, C.M.Taylor & Razafim.
- Eumachia sciadephora (Hiern) Razafim. & C.M.Taylor
- Eumachia sclerocarpa (Whistler) Barrabé, C.M.Taylor & Razafim.
- Eumachia straminea (Hutch.) Barrabé, C.M.Taylor & Razafim.
- Eumachia trichostoma (Merr. & L.M.Perry) Barrabé, C.M.Taylor & Razafim.
- Eumachia triflora (Urb.) C.M.Taylor & Razafim.
- Eumachia vaupelii (Whistler) Barrabé, C.M.Taylor & Razafim.
- Eumachia viridicalyx (R.D.Good) Razafim. & C.M.Taylor
- Eumachia wildemaniana (T.Durand ex De Wild.) Razafim. & C.M.Taylor
- Eumachia wilhelminensis (Steyerm.) Delprete & J.H.Kirkbr.
