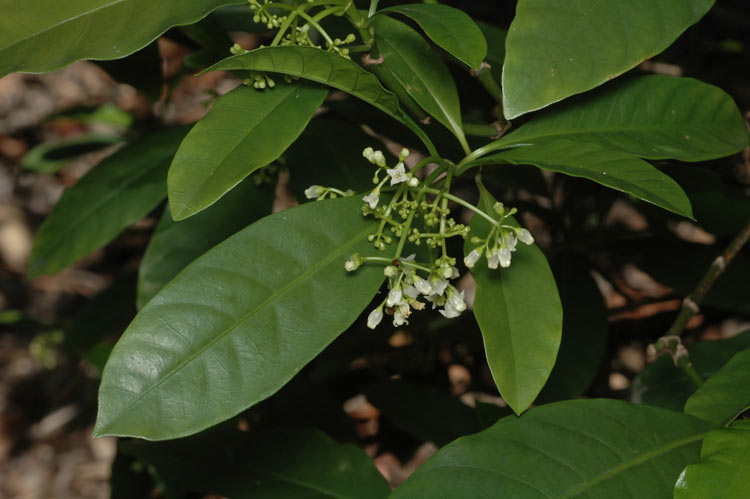
- In Mount Coot-tha Botanic Gardens

Scientific classification
- Kingdom: Plantae
- Clade: Tracheophytes
- Clade: Angiosperms
- Clade: Eudicots
- Clade: Asterids
- Order: Gentianales
- Family: Rubiaceae
- Genus: Eumachia
- Species: E. frutescens

Binomial name
- Eumachia frutescens (C.T.White) Barrabé, C.M.Taylor & Razafim.

Synonyms
- Hodgkinsonia frutescens C.T.White

= Eumachia frutescens =

Species of plant

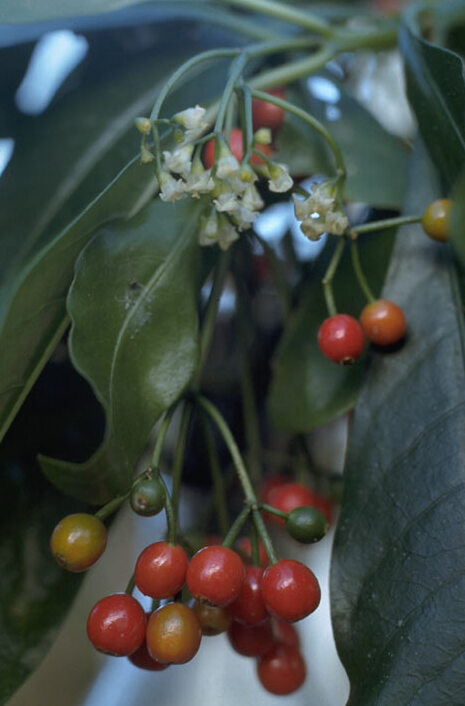
Fruit

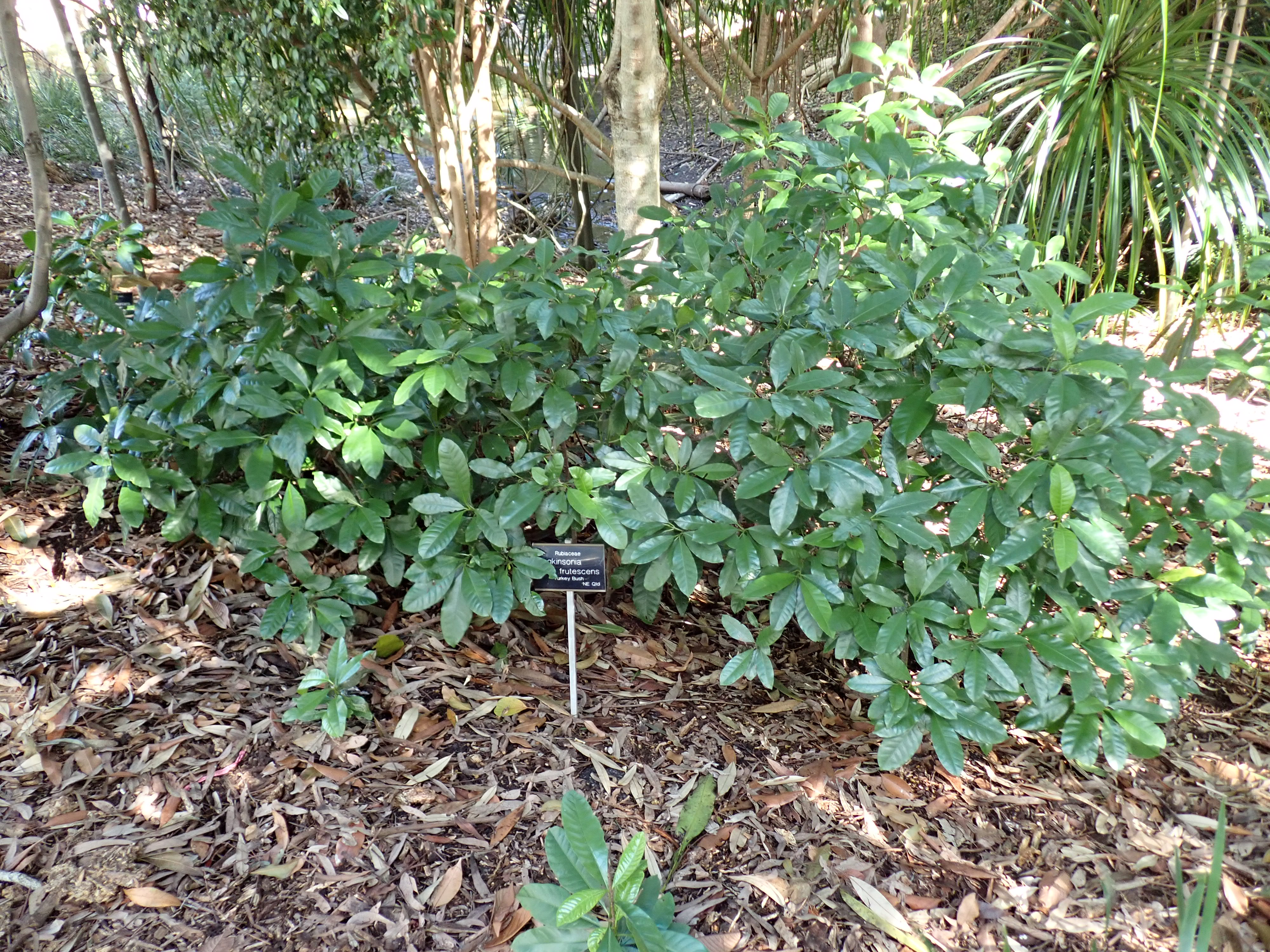
Habit in Mount Coot-tha Botanic Gardens

Eumachiaia frutescens, commonly known as turkey bush, is a species of flowering plant in the family Rubiaceae and is native to north Queensland in Australia. It is an understorey plant with relatively large leaves, tube-shaped white flowers and red drupes.

== Description ==
Eumachiaia frutescens is an understorey plant that typically grows to a height of about 1–3 m (3 ft 3 in – 9 ft 10 in) with leaves about 80–200 mm (3.1–7.9 in) long and 30–60 mm (1.2–2.4 in) wide with broadly triangular stipules that persist, even when the leaves have fallen. The flowers are white, the petals fused at the base to form a tube about 3 mm (0.12 in) long and glabrous outside but densely hairy inside, the anthers about 1.5–2 mm (0.059–0.079 in) long. The fruit is a red drupe about 10–12 mm (0.39–0.47 in) long and 7–8 mm (0.28–0.31 in) wide, usually containing two seeds.

== Taxonomy ==
This species was first formally described in 1942 by Cyril Tenison White who gave it the name Hodgkinsonia frutescens in the Proceedings of the Royal Society of Queensland. The specific epithet (frutescens) means "becoming bushy". In 2017, Laure Barrabé, Charlotte Morley Taylor and Sylvain G. Razafimandimbison transferred the species to the genus Eumachia as E. frutescens, in the journal Candollea.

== Distribution and habitat ==
Turkey bush grows on Cape York Peninsula and in north-east Queensland from sea level to 800 m (2,600 ft), usually in dry rainforest.
