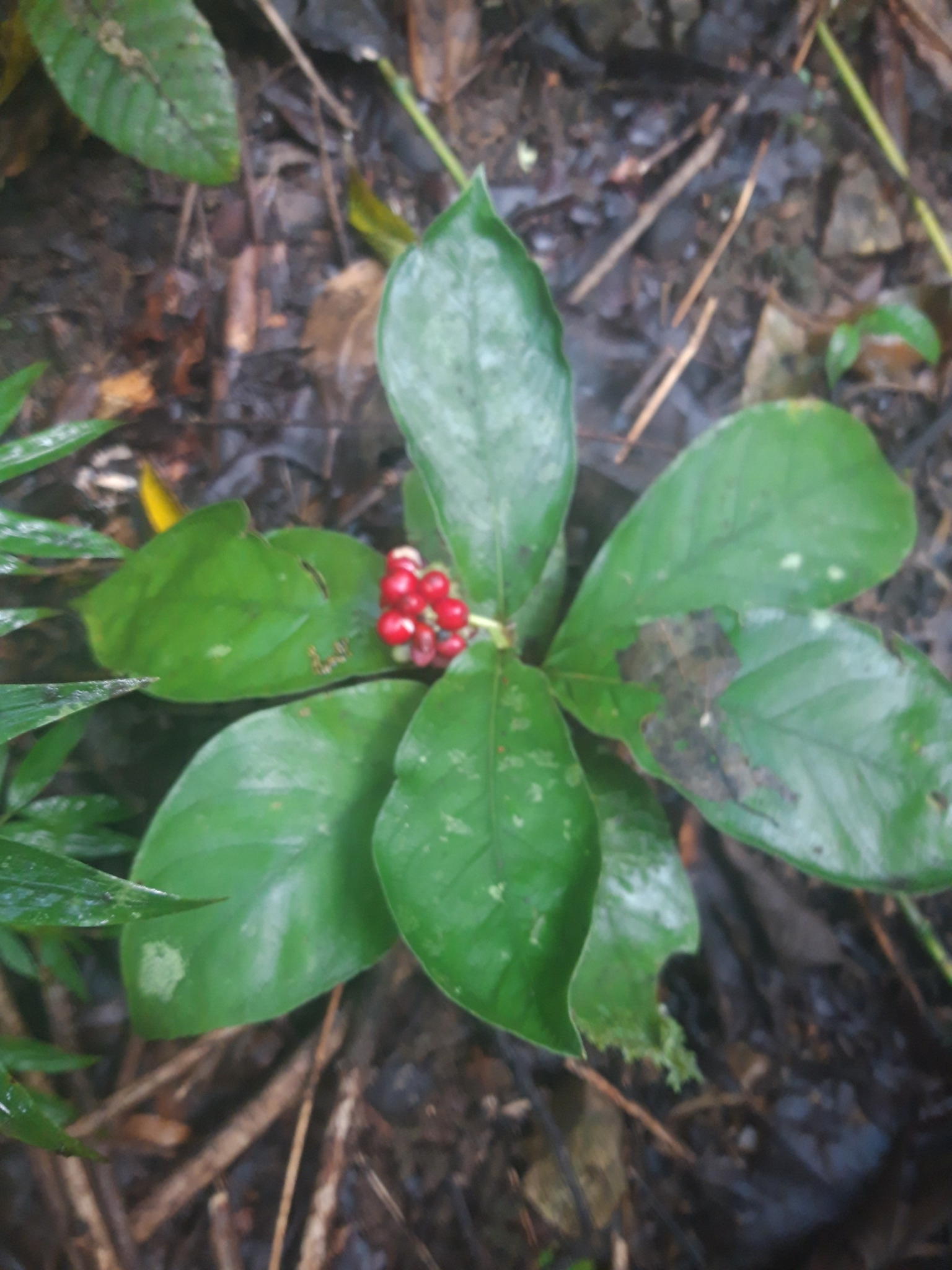
- Carapichea ipecacuanha

Scientific classification
- Kingdom: Plantae
- Clade: Embryophytes
- Clade: Tracheophytes
- Clade: Spermatophytes
- Clade: Angiosperms
- Clade: Eudicots
- Clade: Asterids
- Order: Gentianales
- Family: Rubiaceae
- Subfamily: Rubioideae
- Tribe: Palicoureeae
- Genus: Carapichea; Aubl.

Type species
- Carapichea guianensis Aubl.

Synonyms
- Ipecacuanha Raf.; Nettlera Raf., nom. superfl.; Stachyococcus Standl.

= Carapichea =

Genus of flowering plants

Carapichea is a genus of flowering plants in the family Rubiaceae. It is native to Central America and northern South America from Nicaragua to Brazil. One species, Carapichea ipecacuanha, is used medicinally as the source of ipecac, a powerful emetic.

24 species are accepted:

- Carapichea adinantha (Standl.) C.M.Taylor
- Carapichea affinis (Standl.) L.Andersson - Costa Rica, Bolivia, Colombia, Ecuador, Peru, Brazil
- Carapichea araguariensis (Steyerm.) C.M.Taylor
- Carapichea cardenasiana C.M.Taylor
- Carapichea crebinervia (Standl.) C.M.Taylor
- Carapichea dolichophylla (Standl.) C.M.Taylor - Colombia, Ecuador, Peru
- Carapichea fimbriflora (Steyerm.) C.M.Taylor
- Carapichea franquevilleana (Müll.Arg.) C.M.Taylor
- Carapichea galbaoensis (Steyerm.) O.Lachenaud & Delprete
- Carapichea guianensis Aubl. - Suriname, French Guiana, Amapá, Pará
- Carapichea ipecacuanha (Brot.) L.Andersson - Costa Rica, Nicaragua, Panama, Colombia, Brazil
- Carapichea klugii (Standl.) C.M.Taylor
- Carapichea ligularis (Rudge) Delprete - Brazil, Suriname, French Guiana, Guyana
- Carapichea lucida J.G.Jardim & Zappi - Bahia
- Carapichea maturacensis (Steyerm.) C.M.Taylor
- Carapichea necopinata (Standl.) C.M.Taylor
- Carapichea pacimonica (Müll.Arg.) C.M.Taylor
- Carapichea panurensis (Müll.Arg.) C.M.Taylor
- Carapichea sandwithiana (Steyerm.) C.M.Taylor
- Carapichea squamelligera (Steyerm.) O.Lachenaud & Delprete
- Carapichea tillettii (Steyerm.) C.M.Taylor
- Carapichea urniformis (Steyerm.) C.M.Taylor
- Carapichea vasivensis (Müll.Arg.) C.M.Taylor
- Carapichea verrucosa C.M.Taylor
