= Rudgea casarettoana =

Scientific classification
- Kingdom: Plantae
- Clade: Tracheophytes
- Clade: Angiosperms
- Clade: Eudicots
- Clade: Asterids
- Order: Gentianales
- Family: Rubiaceae
- Genus: Rudgea
- Species: R. casarettoana

Binomial name
- Rudgea casarettoana Müll.Arg.

Synonyms
- Uragoga casarettoana (Müll.Arg.) Kuntze

Species of plant

Rudgea casarettoana is a species of flowering plant in the family Rubiaceae, native to Bahia, Brazil. It was collected by and named for Giovanni Casaretto.
