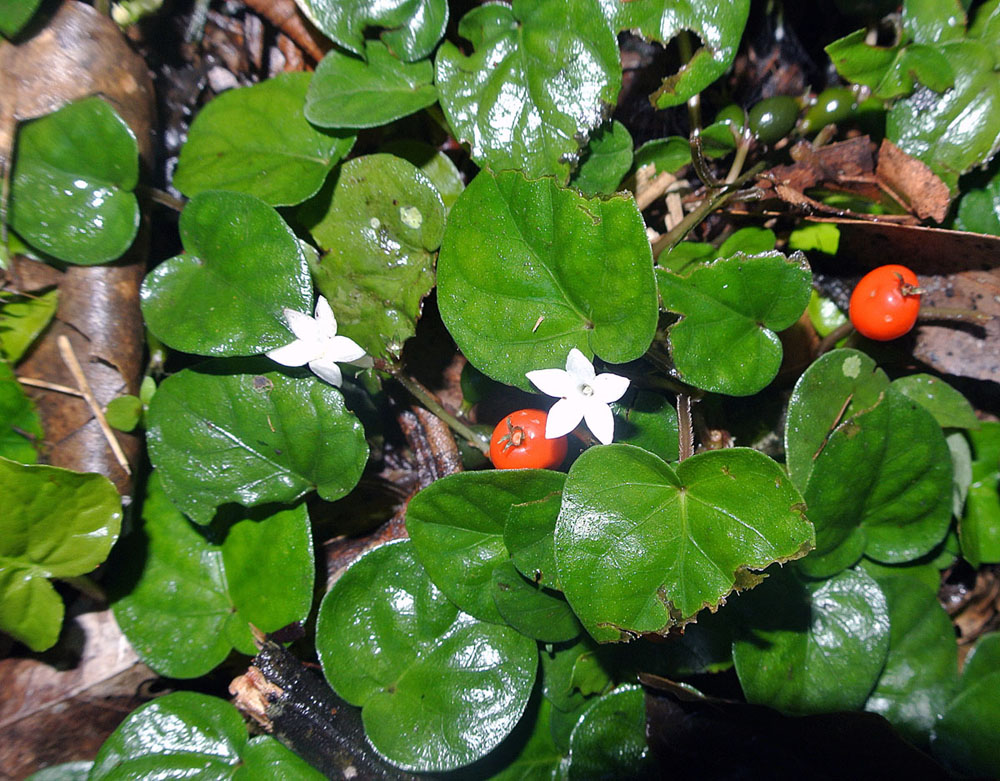
- Geophila repens

Scientific classification
- Kingdom: Plantae
- Clade: Tracheophytes
- Clade: Angiosperms
- Clade: Eudicots
- Clade: Asterids
- Order: Gentianales
- Family: Rubiaceae
- Subfamily: Rubioideae
- Tribe: Palicoureeae
- Genus: Geophila; D.Don

Type species
- Geophila reniformis D. Don.

Synonyms
- Carinta W.Wight; Geocardia Standl.

= Geophila =

Genus of flowering plant

Geophila is a genus of herbs in the family Rubiaceae. This genus is pantropical, as it is found in most tropical regions.

The name Geophila was once applied to a genus of mushrooms (defined by Lucien Quélet in 1886 with the modern Stropharia inuncta as type species), but this usage is now obsolete and illegitimate.

== Species ==
The following species are recognized:

- Geophila afzelii Hiern
- Geophila aschersoniana Büttner
- Geophila cordata Bello
- Geophila cordifolia Miq.
- Geophila croatii Steyerm.
- Geophila emarginata K.Krause
- Geophila erythrocarpa Vanth. & Dessein
- Geophila flaviflora Aké Assi
- Geophila gracilis (Ruiz & Pav.) DC.
- Geophila hirta Korth.
- Geophila humifusa King & Gamble
- Geophila ingens Wernham
- Geophila lancistipula Hiern
- Geophila macrocarpa (Müll.Arg.) ined.
- Geophila macropoda (Ruiz & Pav.) DC.
- Geophila matthewii Ridl.
- Geophila melanocarpa Ridl.
- Geophila minutiflora Alain
- Geophila obvallata Didr.
- Geophila orbicularis (Müll.Arg.) Steyerm.
- Geophila pilosa H.Pearson
- Geophila prancei Steyerm.
- Geophila renaris De Wild. & T.Durand
- Geophila repens (L.) I.M.Johnst.
- Geophila scortechinii King
- Geophila speciosa K.Schum.
- Geophila tenuis (Müll.Arg.) Standl.
- Geophila yunnanensis H.lév.
- Geophila zollingeriana Miq.
