= Syrup of ipecac =

Plant-derived drug used for airway decongestion and to induce vomiting

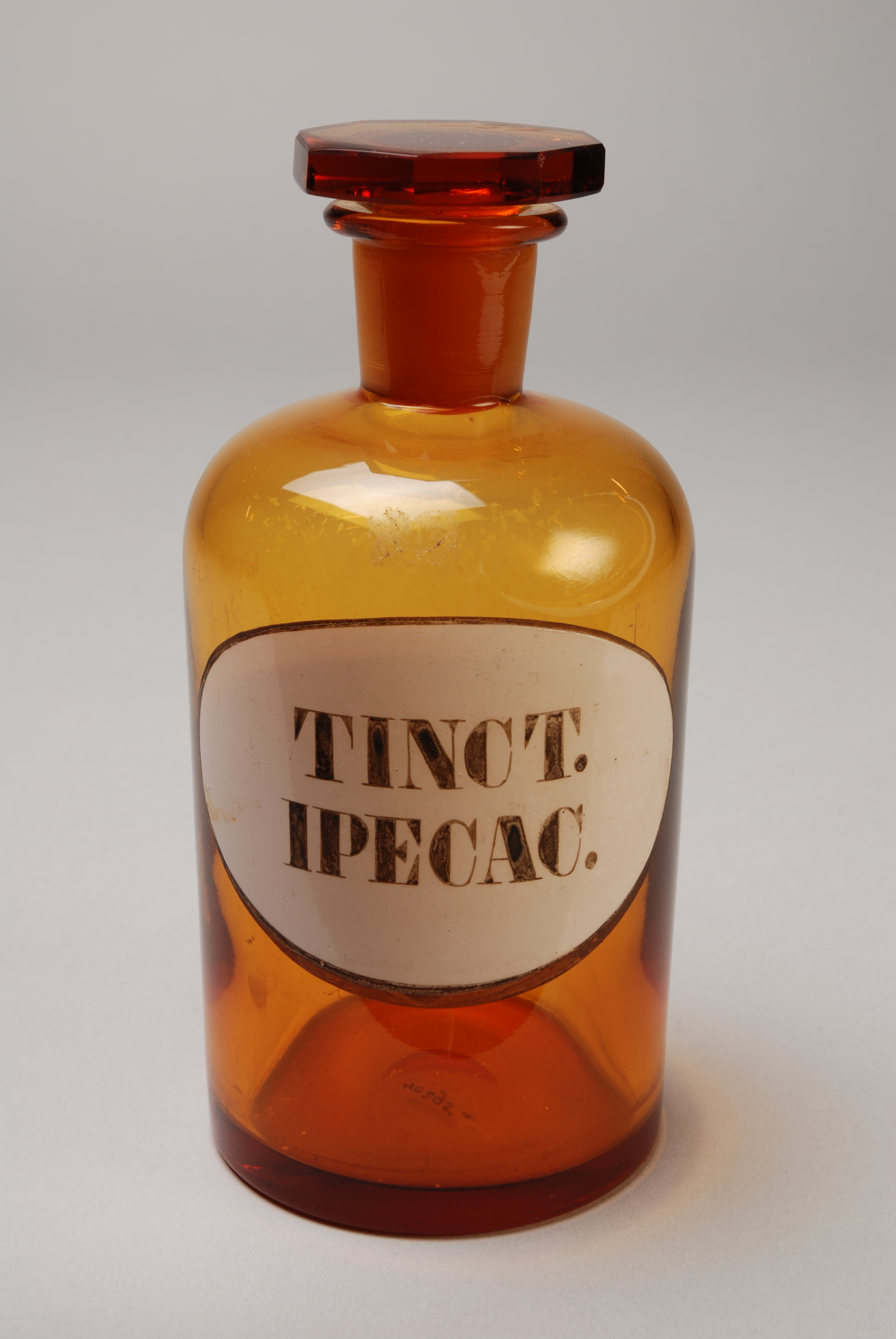
- Flask for tincture of ipecac (ipecac roots and rhizomes dissolved in alcohol, which is watered down and sweetened to make syrup of ipecac)

Clinical data
- Routes of administration: Oral
- ATC code: R05CA04 (WHO) V03AB01 (WHO)

Identifiers
- CAS Number: 8012-96-2
- ChemSpider: none
- UNII: 62I3C8233L
- ECHA InfoCard: 100.029.439

Syrup of ipecac (/ˈɪpɪkæk/ IP-ih-kak), or simply ipecac, is a drug that was once widely used as an expectorant (in low doses) and a rapid-acting emetic (in higher doses). It is obtained from the dried rhizome and roots of the ipecacuanha plant (Carapichea ipecacuanha), from which it derives its name. It is no longer regularly used in medicine.

In particular, the rapidly induced forceful vomiting produced by ipecac was considered for many years to be an important front-line treatment for orally ingested poisons. However, subsequent studies (including a comprehensive 2005 meta-study) revealed the stomach purging produced by ipecac to be far less effective at lowering total body poison concentrations than the adsorption effect of oral activated charcoal (which is effective through the entire gastrointestinal tract and is often coupled with whole bowel irrigation). Ipecac also presents a small risk of overdose (being a mild poison itself) and a major risk of esophagitis and aspiration pneumonia if used to purge corrosive poisons. Having long been replaced (even in the emetic role) by more effective medications, the American Society of Health-System Pharmacists (ASHP) now advises that "Ipecac syrup is no longer recommended for routine management of outpatient ingestions of medications or other chemicals."

Ipecac is commonly made from alcohol extraction of the ipecacuanha plant. The extract is commonly mixed with glycerin, sugar (syrup), and methylparaben. The active ingredients are plant alkaloids, cephaeline, and methyl-cephaeline (emetine).

== Use ==
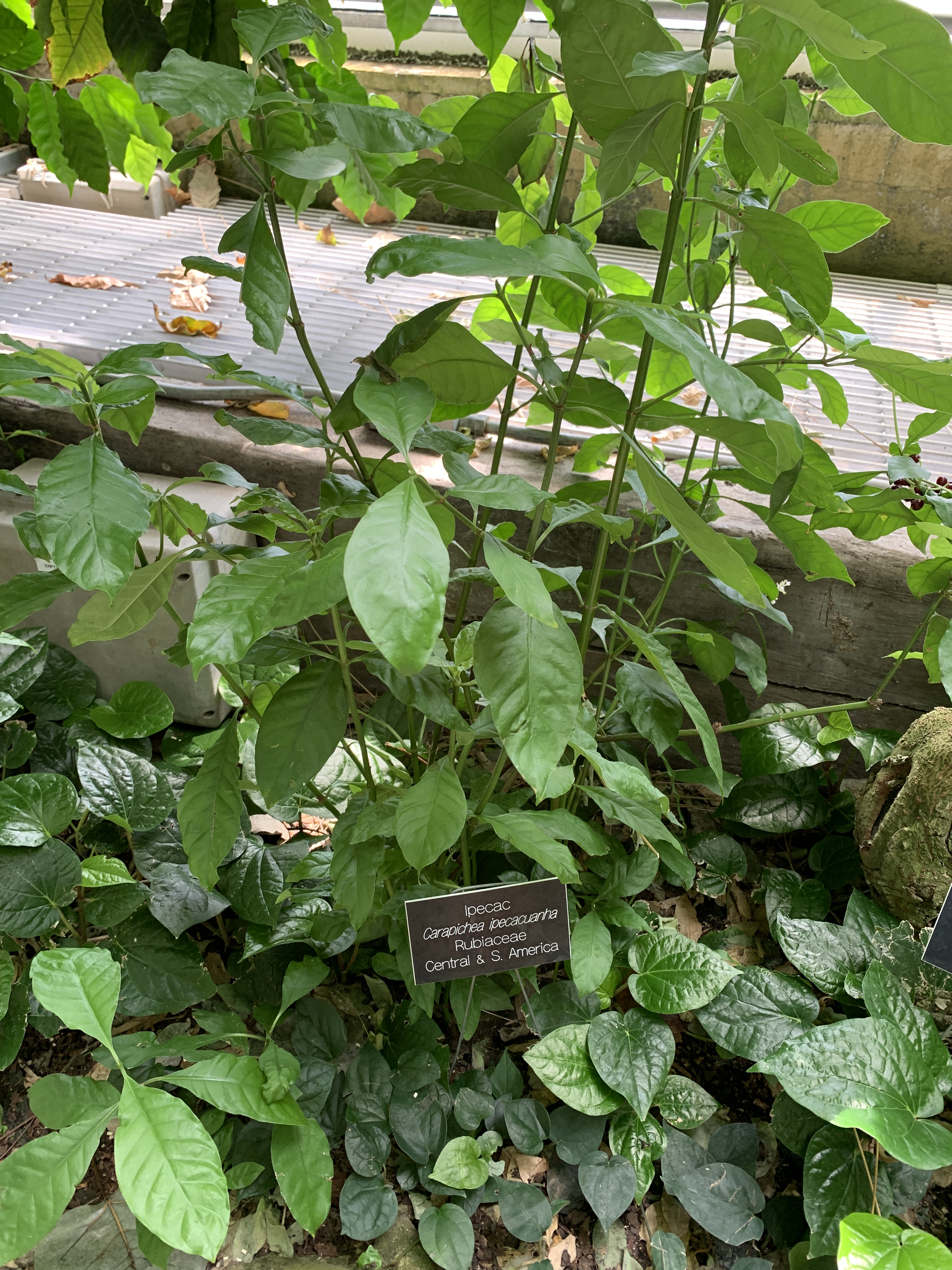
Ipecac plant

Ipecac was used in cough mixtures as an expectorant or an emetic from the 18th until the early 20th century. For instance, ipecac and opium were used to produce Dover's powder, which was used in syrup form.

In 1965, the Food and Drug Administration (FDA) approved the sale of up to one ounce of syrup of ipecac without a prescription. At the time it was approved, its use was recommended by the American Academy of Pediatrics, American Association of Poison Control Centers, American Medical Association, and the FDA's medical advisory board as a method to induce vomiting "for quick first-aid use in the home, under medical supervision", for use in cases of accidental poisoning.

Current guidelines from the American Academy of Pediatrics, however, strongly advise against this and in fact recommend the disposal of any syrup of ipecac present in the home. Many toxicological associations have also issued position papers recommending against its use as a first-line treatment for most ingested poisons, because of a lack of evidence that syrup of ipecac actually helps improve the outcome in cases of poisoning. Moreover, accidental overdose of ipecac can result when administered in the home. When dealing with poisoning cases in the hospital, it became difficult to obtain a differential diagnosis when syrup of ipecac had been administered, as this can add further symptoms.

A 2005 review by a Health Resources and Services Administration-funded scientific panel concluded that vomiting alone does not reliably remove poisons from the stomach. The study suggested that indications for use of ipecac syrup were rare, and patients should be treated by more effective and safer means. Additionally, its potential side effects, such as lethargy, can be confused with the poison's effects, complicating diagnosis. The use of ipecac may also delay the use of other treatments (e.g., activated charcoal, whole bowel irrigation, or oral antidotes) or make them less effective.

=== Misuse ===
Ipecac has been used by people with bulimia nervosa as a means to achieve weight loss through induced vomiting. Repeated use in this manner is believed to cause damage to the heart and muscles, which can ultimately result in the user's death. Misuse of ipecac has been considered a possible cause of death of musician Karen Carpenter in 1983 who suffered from anorexia nervosa. It has also been used as an agent for factitious disorder imposed on another.

== Mechanism of action ==
The actions of ipecac are mainly those of major alkaloids, emetine (methylcephaeline) and cephaeline. They both act locally by irritating the gastric mucosa and centrally by stimulating the medullary chemoreceptor trigger zone to induce vomiting.

== Discontinuation ==
Ipecac has been found to have minimal health benefits, and is ultimately ineffective at purging the body of poisonous substances. It was initially discontinued due to production costs and lack of raw materials. As the ASHP advises: "Ipecac syrup is no longer recommended for routine management of outpatient ingestions of medications or other chemicals." Humco and Paddock Laboratories, the last two companies to continue manufacturing ipecac syrup, both stopped production in 2010.

A heavily cited position statement outlines critical details of its effectiveness:

In experimental studies the amount of marker removed by ipecac was highly variable and diminished with time. There is no evidence from clinical studies that ipecac improves the outcome of poisoned patients and its routine administration in the emergency department should be abandoned. There is insufficient data to support or exclude ipecac administration soon after poison ingestion. Ipecac may delay the administration or reduce the effectiveness of activated charcoal, oral antidotes, and whole bowel irrigation. Ipecac should not be administered to a patient who has a decreased level or impending loss of consciousness or who has ingested a corrosive substance or hydrocarbon with high aspiration potential.

== See also ==
- Antiemetic
