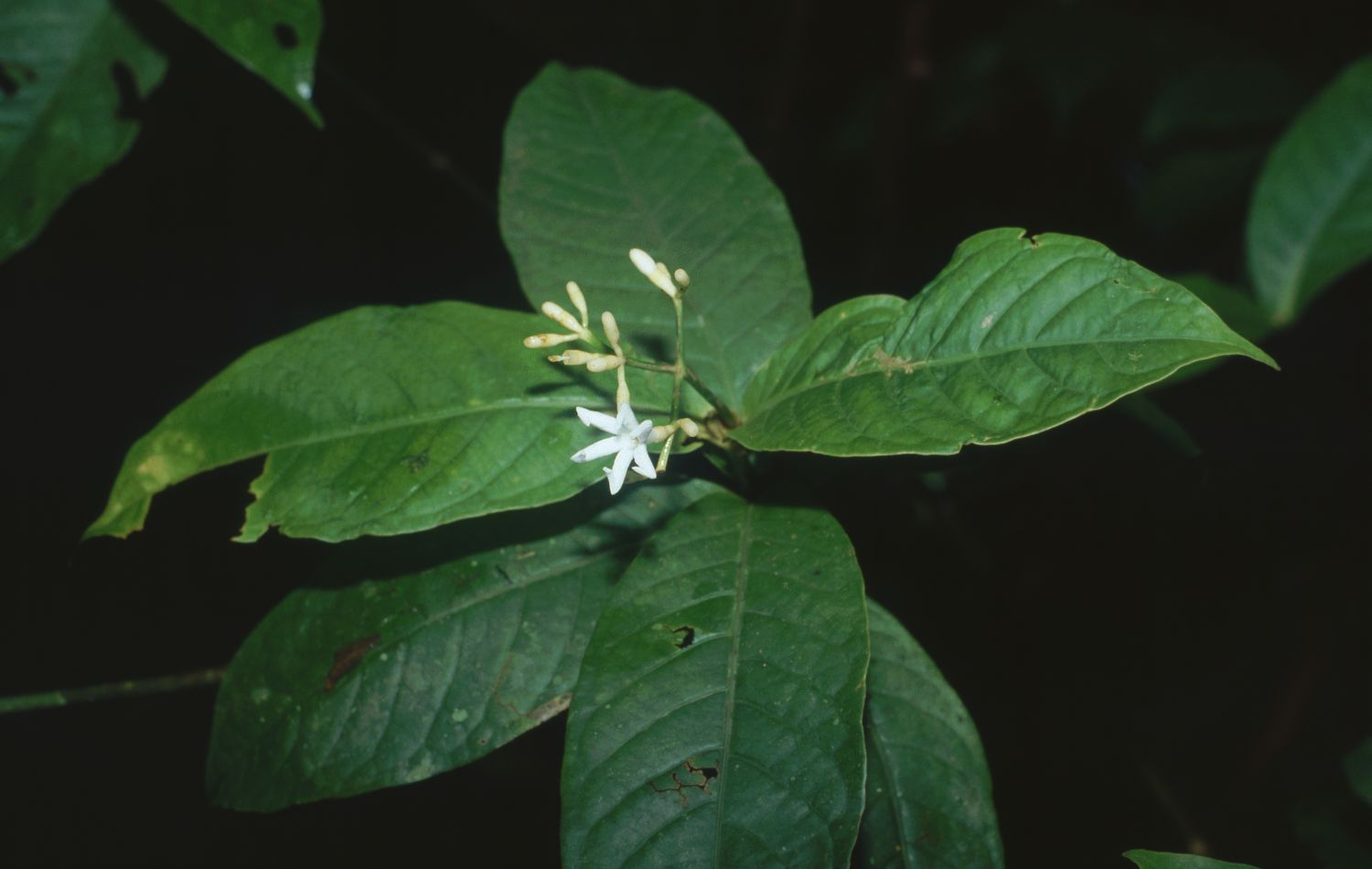
- Rudgea skutchii

Scientific classification
- Kingdom: Plantae
- Clade: Tracheophytes
- Clade: Angiosperms
- Clade: Eudicots
- Clade: Asterids
- Order: Gentianales
- Family: Rubiaceae
- Subfamily: Rubioideae
- Tribe: Palicoureeae
- Genus: Rudgea; Salisb.

= Rudgea =

Genus of plants

Rudgea is a genus of plant in the family Rubiaceae.

Species include:

- Rudgea casarettoana Müll.Arg.
- Rudgea crassifolia Zappi & E.Lucas
- Rudgea obesiflora Standl.
- Rudgea parquioides (Cham.) Müll.Arg.
- Rudgea stenophylla (Krause) Standl.

The name was given by Richard Anthony Salisbury to honour Edward Rudge in 1806.
