= Notopleura madida =

Conservation status
- Endangered (IUCN 3.1)

Scientific classification
- Kingdom: Plantae
- Clade: Tracheophytes
- Clade: Angiosperms
- Clade: Eudicots
- Clade: Asterids
- Order: Gentianales
- Family: Rubiaceae
- Genus: Notopleura
- Species: N. madida

Binomial name
- Notopleura madida (Standl.) C.M.Taylor

Synonyms
- Psychotria madida Standl.

Species of plant

Notopleura madida is a species of plant in the family Rubiaceae. It is endemic to Ecuador.
