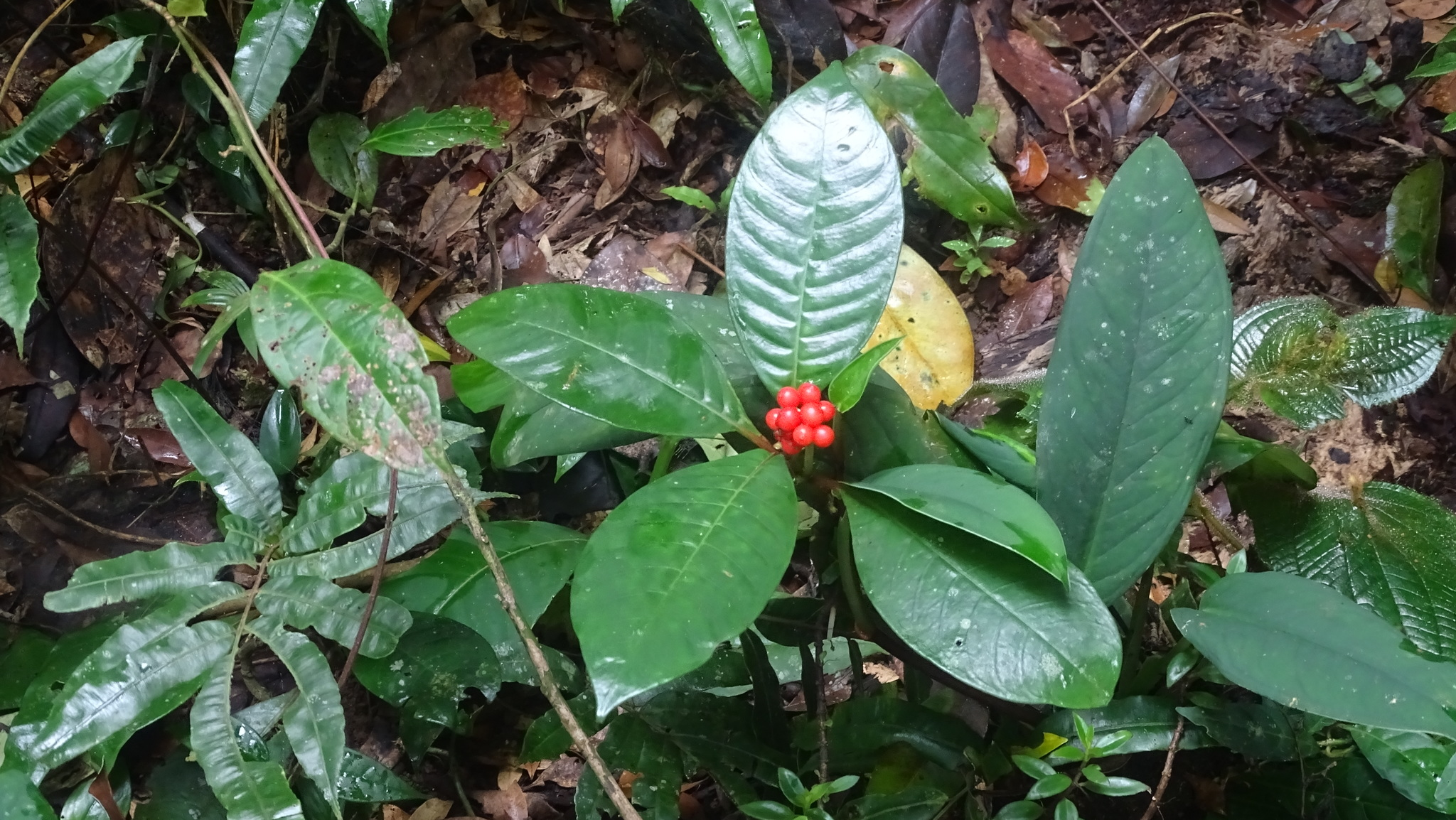

Scientific classification
- Kingdom: Plantae
- Clade: Tracheophytes
- Clade: Angiosperms
- Clade: Eudicots
- Clade: Asterids
- Order: Gentianales
- Family: Rubiaceae
- Genus: Notopleura
- Species: N. uliginosa

Binomial name
- Notopleura uliginosa (Sw.) Bremek.

= Notopleura uliginosa =

Species of plant

== Description ==
Notopleura uliginosa is a plant from the genus Notopleura. It was first described by Cornelis Eliza Bertus Bremekamp in 1934.

== Range ==
Its range extends from Mexico to Bolivia and to the east from the Antilles to The Guianas, as reported in the Global Biodiversity Information Facility.
