= Rudgea obesiflora =

Conservation status
- Vulnerable (IUCN 2.3)

Scientific classification
- Kingdom: Plantae
- Clade: Tracheophytes
- Clade: Angiosperms
- Clade: Eudicots
- Clade: Asterids
- Order: Gentianales
- Family: Rubiaceae
- Genus: Rudgea
- Species: R. obesiflora

Binomial name
- Rudgea obesiflora Standl.

Species of plant

Rudgea obesiflora is a species of plant in the family Rubiaceae. It is endemic to Peru and is found in lowland forests.
