= Puffia =

Scientific classification
- Kingdom: Plantae
- Clade: Tracheophytes
- Clade: Angiosperms
- Clade: Eudicots
- Clade: Asterids
- Order: Gentianales
- Family: Rubiaceae
- Subfamily: Rubioideae
- Tribe: Palicoureeae
- Genus: Puffia; Razafim. & B.Bremer
- Species: P. gerrardii

Binomial name
- Puffia gerrardii (Baker) Razafim. & B.Bremer

Synonyms
- Geophila gerrardii Baker; Carinta gerrardii (Baker) Bremek.

Genus of plants

Puffia is a monotypic genus of flowering plants in the family Rubiaceae. The genus contains only one species, viz. Puffia gerrardii, which is restricted to the littoral forests of southeastern Madagascar.
