= Rudgea crassifolia =

Conservation status
- Near Threatened (IUCN 3.1)

Scientific classification
- Kingdom: Plantae
- Clade: Tracheophytes
- Clade: Angiosperms
- Clade: Eudicots
- Clade: Asterids
- Order: Gentianales
- Family: Rubiaceae
- Genus: Rudgea
- Species: R. crassifolia

Binomial name
- Rudgea crassifolia Zappi & E.Lucas

Species of plant

Rudgea crassifolia is a species of plant in the family Rubiaceae. It is endemic to Brazil. Its natural habitat is subtropical or tropical dry shrubland. It is threatened by habitat loss.
