= Eumachia montana =

Scientific classification
- Kingdom: Plantae
- Clade: Tracheophytes
- Clade: Angiosperms
- Clade: Eudicots
- Clade: Asterids
- Order: Gentianales
- Family: Rubiaceae
- Genus: Eumachia
- Species: E. montana

Binomial name
- Eumachia montana Blume

Synonyms
- Psychotria montana; Psychotria expansa

Species of plant

Eumachia montana is a West Sumatran rainforest understory shrub from the family Rubiaceae.
