= Rudgea parquioides =

Scientific classification
- Kingdom: Plantae
- Clade: Tracheophytes
- Clade: Angiosperms
- Clade: Eudicots
- Clade: Asterids
- Order: Gentianales
- Family: Rubiaceae
- Genus: Rudgea
- Species: R. parquioides

Binomial name
- Rudgea parquioides (Cham.) Müll.Arg.

Synonyms
- Coffea parquioides Cham.

Species of plant

Rudgea parquioides is a shrub species that occurs in Brazil, in the Atlantic Forest Biome in the regions Sudeste (in São Paulo state) and Sul (in Paraná, Santa Catarina and Rio Grande do Sul states).
