= Hymenocoleus =

Scientific classification
- Kingdom: Plantae
- Clade: Tracheophytes
- Clade: Angiosperms
- Clade: Eudicots
- Clade: Asterids
- Order: Gentianales
- Family: Rubiaceae
- Subfamily: Rubioideae
- Tribe: Palicoureeae
- Genus: Hymenocoleus; Robbr.

Genus of plants

Hymenocoleus is a genus of flowering plants in the family Rubiaceae and occurs in tropical Africa.

== Species ==
- Hymenocoleus axillaris Robbr.
- Hymenocoleus barbatus Robbr.
- Hymenocoleus glaber Robbr.
- Hymenocoleus globulifer Robbr.
- Hymenocoleus hirsutus (Benth.) Robbr.
- Hymenocoleus libericus (A.Chev. ex Hutch. & Dalziel) Robbr.
- Hymenocoleus multinervis Robbr.
- Hymenocoleus nervopilosus Robbr.
- Hymenocoleus neurodictyon (K.Schum.) Robbr.
- Hymenocoleus rotundifolius (A.Chev. ex Hepper) Robbr.
- Hymenocoleus scaphus (K.Schum.) Robbr.
- Hymenocoleus subipecacuanha (K.Schum.) Robbr.
