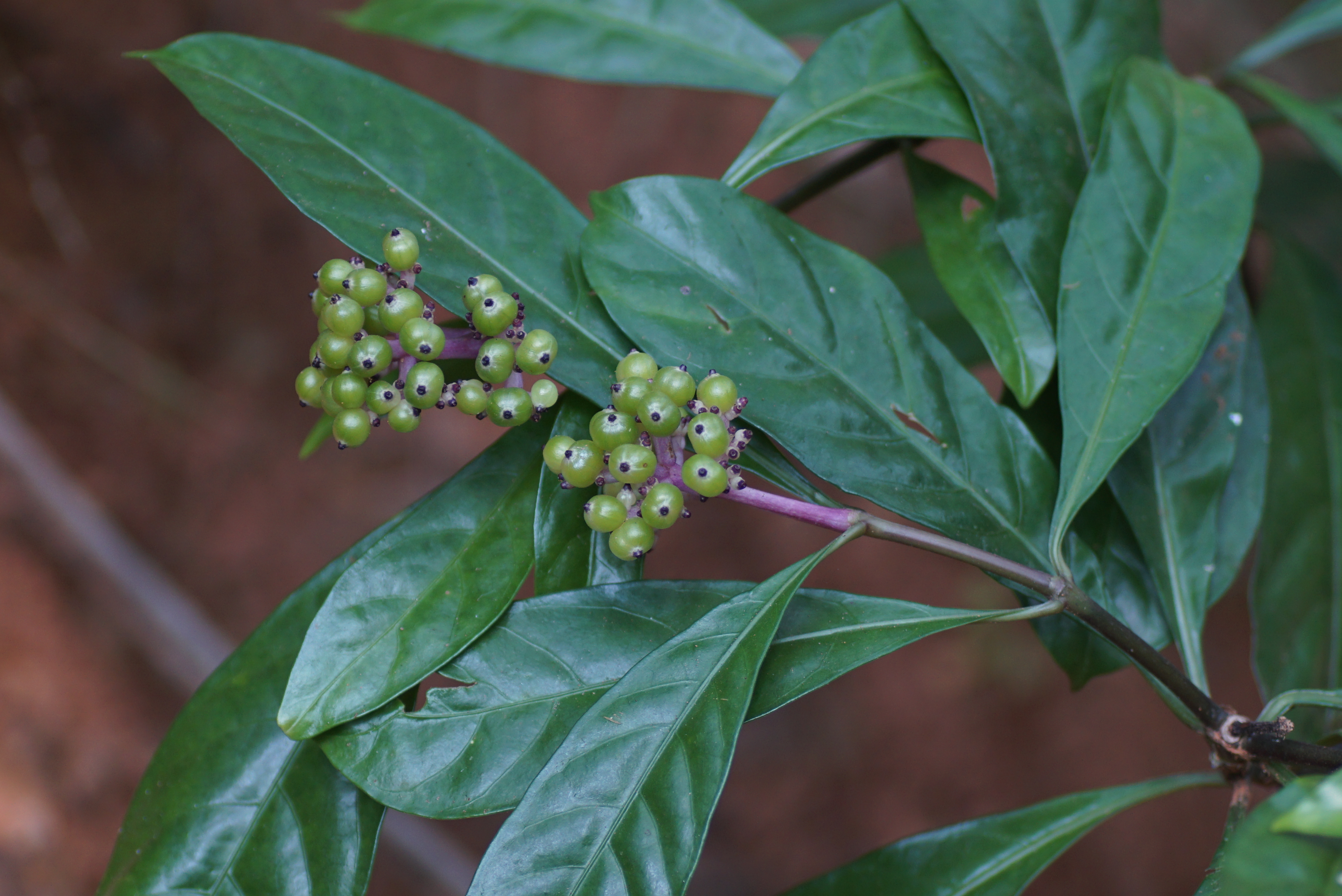

Scientific classification
- Kingdom: Plantae
- Clade: Tracheophytes
- Clade: Angiosperms
- Clade: Eudicots
- Clade: Asterids
- Order: Gentianales
- Family: Rubiaceae
- Genus: Chassalia
- Species: C. curviflora

Binomial name
- Chassalia curviflora (Wallich) Thwaites

= Chassalia curviflora =

Species of plant

Chassalia curviflora is a species of flowering plant in the family Rubiaceae. Its common names include curved flower woody chassalia and wan guan hua. It is native to South and East Asia (from India to China and Indonesia).

== Image gallery ==
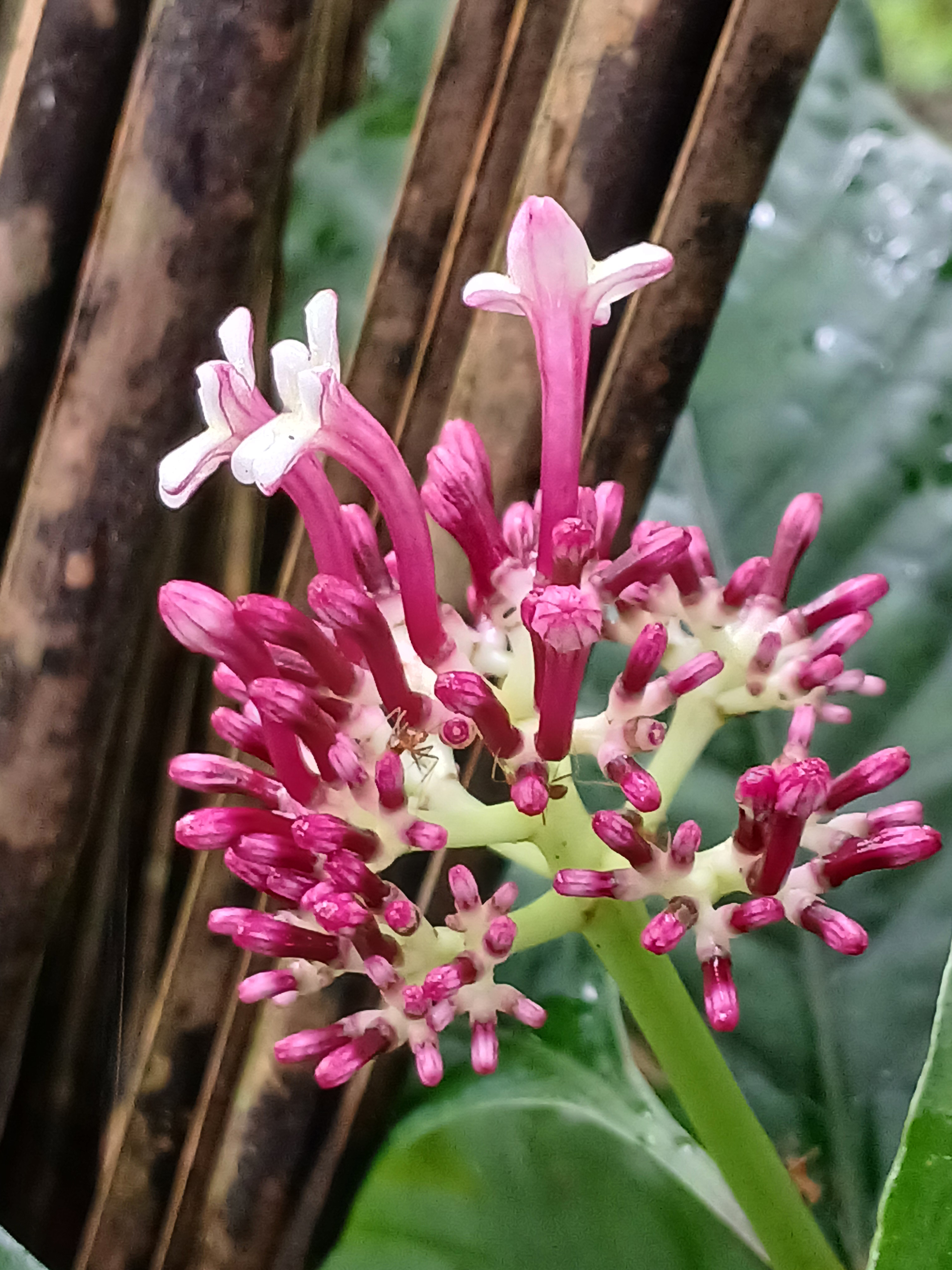
Chassalia curviflora in Pulikurumba

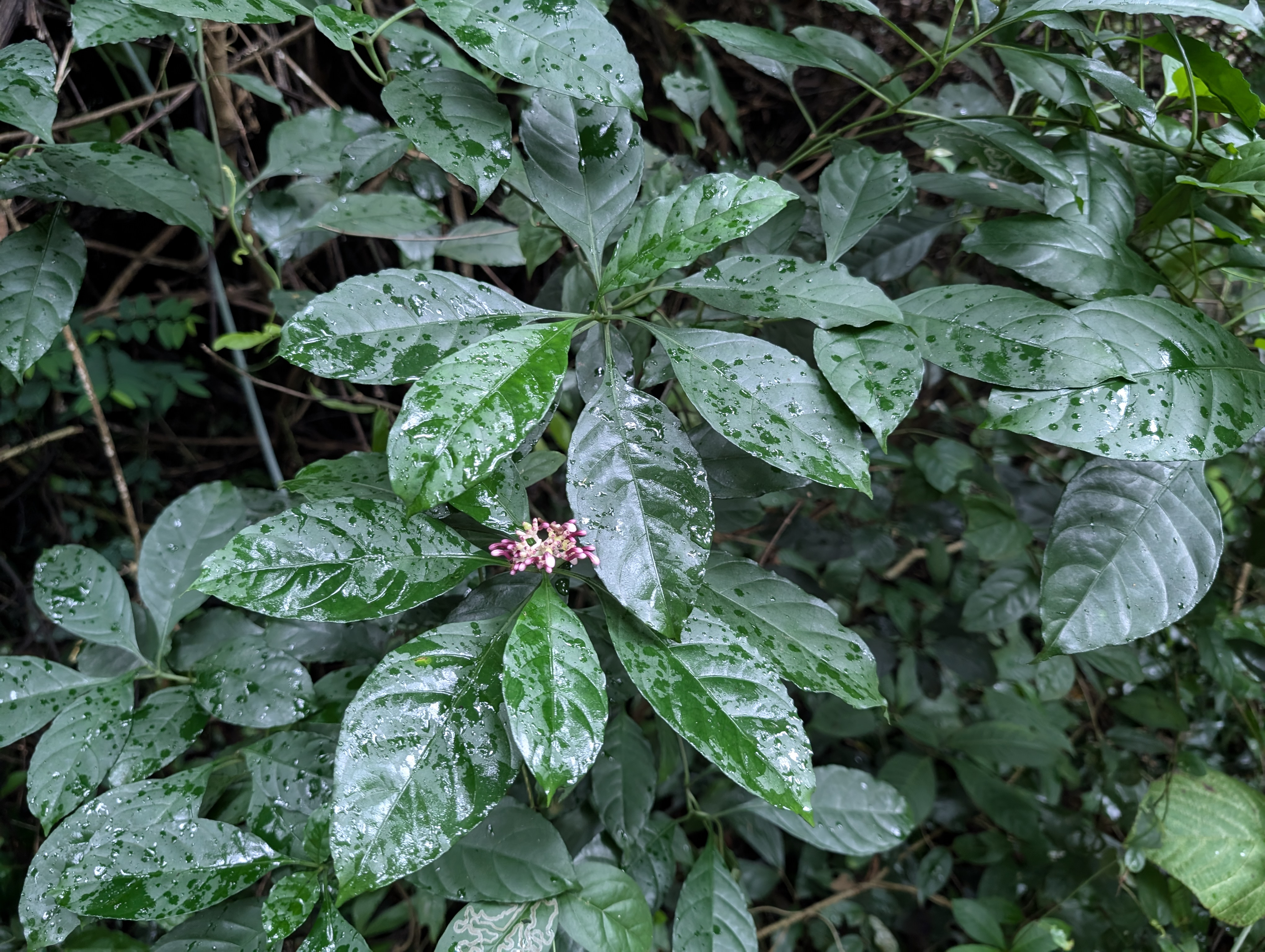
Chassalia curviflora at Kalasamala, Thrissur

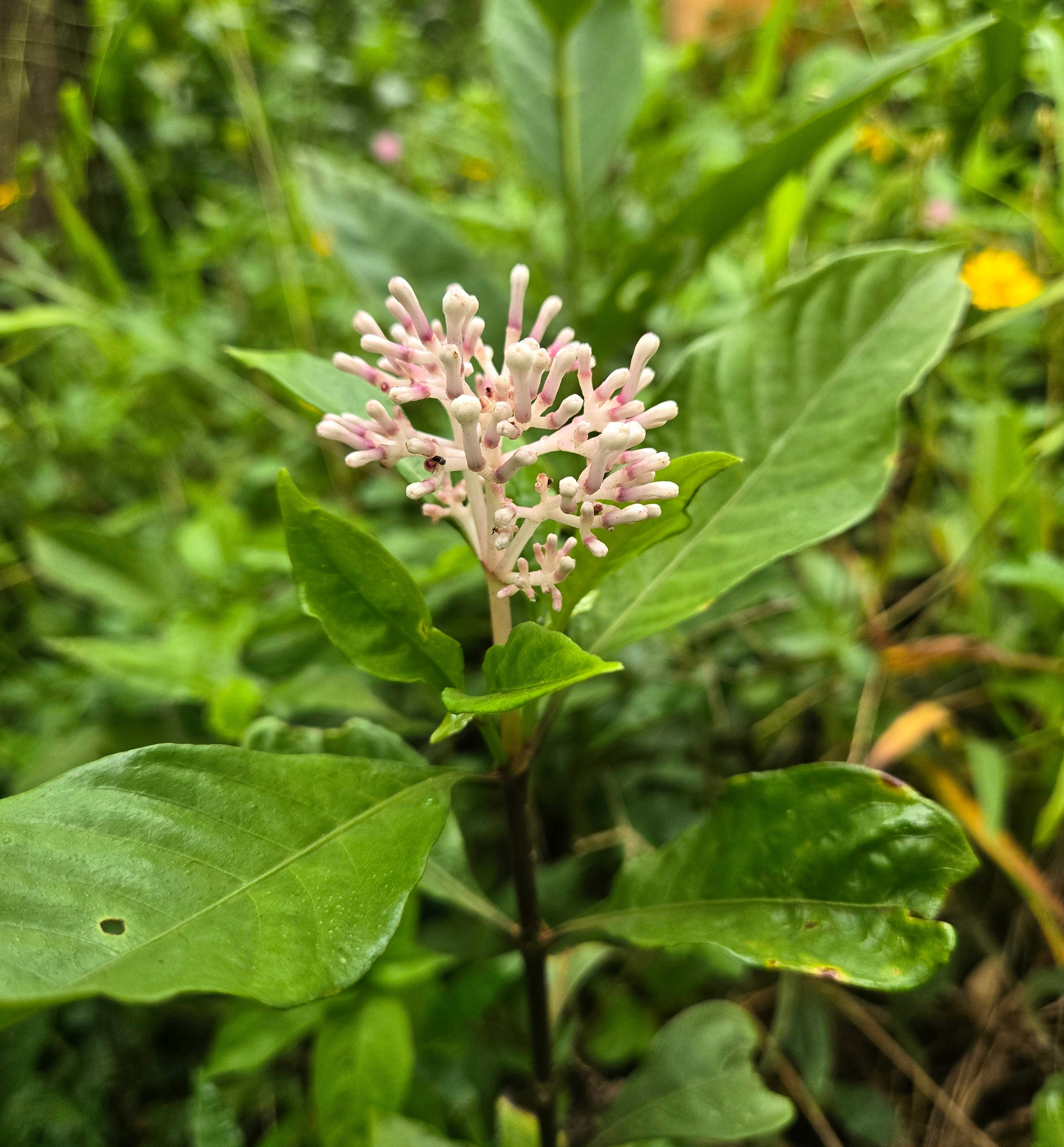
Chassalia curviflora at Dharmasthala, Karnataka
