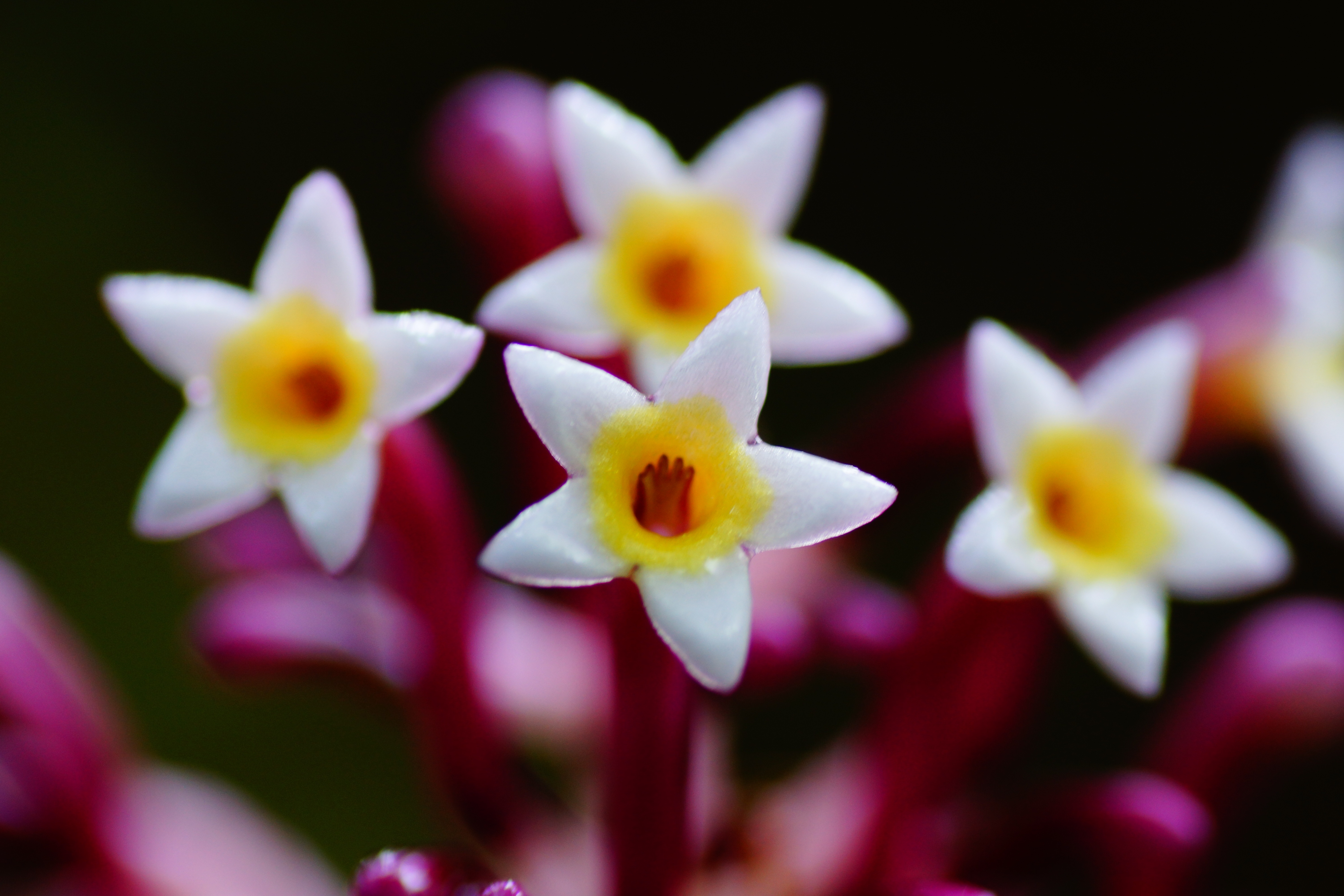
- Chassalia curviflora

Scientific classification
- Kingdom: Plantae
- Clade: Tracheophytes
- Clade: Angiosperms
- Clade: Eudicots
- Clade: Asterids
- Order: Gentianales
- Family: Rubiaceae
- Subfamily: Rubioideae
- Tribe: Psychotrieae
- Genus: Chassalia; Comm. ex Poir.

Synonyms
- Proscephaleium Korth.; Zwaardekronia Korth.

= Chassalia =

Genus of flowering plants

Chassalia is a genus of flowering plants in the family Rubiaceae. The genus is found from tropical Africa to (sub)tropical Asia.

== Species ==
- Chassalia acutiflora Bremek.
- Chassalia afzelii (Hiern) K.Schum.
- Chassalia albiflora K.Krause
- Chassalia ambodirianensis Bremek.
- Chassalia androrangensis Bremek.
- Chassalia angustifolia (Ridl.) A.P.Davis
- Chassalia assimilis Bremek.
- Chassalia betamponensis Bremek.
- Chassalia betsilensis Bremek.
- Chassalia bicostata O.Lachenaud & Jongkind
- Chassalia bipindensis Sonké, Nguembou & A.P.Davis
- Chassalia blumeana Govaerts
- Chassalia bojeri Bremek.
- Chassalia bonifacei Thulin & S.Mankt.
- Chassalia boryana DC.
- Chassalia bosseri Verdc.
- Chassalia bracteata Ridl.
- Chassalia buchwaldii K.Schum.
- Chassalia capitata DC.
- Chassalia catatii Drake ex Bremek.
- Chassalia caudifolia Bremek.
- Chassalia chartacea Craib
- Chassalia christineae Thulin & S.Mankt.
- Chassalia chrysoclada (K.Schum.) O.Lachenaud
- Chassalia comorensis Bremek.
- Chassalia corallifera (A.Chev. ex De Wild.) Hepper
- Chassalia corallioides (Cordem.) Verdc.
- Chassalia coriacea Verdc.
- Chassalia coursii Bremek.
- Chassalia cristata (Hiern) Bremek.
- Chassalia cupularis Hutch. & Dalziel
- Chassalia curviflora (Wall.) Thwaites
- Chassalia densiflora Bremek.
- Chassalia densifolia Bremek.
- Chassalia discolor K.Schum.
- Chassalia doniana (Benth.) G.Taylor
- Chassalia elliptica (Ridl.) A.P.Davis
- Chassalia elongata Hutch. & Dalziel
- Chassalia euchlora (K.Schum.) Figueiredo
- Chassalia eurybotrya Bremek.
- Chassalia gaertneroides (Cordem.) Verdc.
- Chassalia gracilis Stapf
- Chassalia grandifolia DC.
- Chassalia grandistipula Bremek.
- Chassalia griffithii Hook.f.
- Chassalia hallii W.D.Hawth. & Jongkind
- Chassalia hasseltiana Miq.
- Chassalia hiernii (Kuntze) G.Taylor
- Chassalia humbertii Bremek.
- Chassalia ischnophylla (K.Schum.) Hepper
- Chassalia javanica (Blume) Piessch.
- Chassalia kenyensis Verdc.
- Chassalia kolly (Schumach.) Hepper
- Chassalia laikomensis Cheek
- Chassalia lanceolata (Poir.) A.Chev.
- Chassalia laxiflora Benth.
- Chassalia leandrii Bremek.
- Chassalia leptothyrsa Bremek.
- Chassalia longiloba Borhidi & Verdc.
- Chassalia lukwangulensis Thulin
- Chassalia lushaiensis (C.E.C.Fisch.) Fisch.
- Chassalia lutescens O.Lachenaud & D.J.Harris
- Chassalia macrodiscus K.Schum.
- Chassalia magnificens O.Lachenaud
- Chassalia magnifolia Bremek.
- Chassalia melanocarpa (Ridl.) A.P.Davis
- Chassalia membranacea Craib
- Chassalia microphylla Craib
- Chassalia minor Ridl.
- Chassalia moramangensis Bremek.
- Chassalia nannochlamys (Bakh.f.) A.P.Davis
- Chassalia northiana T.Y.Yu
- Chassalia obscurinervia Elmer
- Chassalia oxylepis Miq.
- Chassalia parva Bremek.
- Chassalia parvifolia K.Schum.
- Chassalia pedicellata Valeton
- Chassalia pentachotoma Bremek.
- Chassalia perrieri Bremek.
- Chassalia petitiana Piesschaert
- Chassalia petrinensis Verdc.
- Chassalia pleuroneura (K.Schum.) O.Lachenaud
- Chassalia porcata (I.M.Turner) A.P.Davis
- Chassalia princei (Dubard & Dop) Bremek.
- Chassalia propinqua Ridl.
- Chassalia pteropetala (K.Schum.) Cheek
- Chassalia pubescens Ridl.
- Chassalia quaternifolia Bremek.
- Chassalia richardii Bremek.
- Chassalia ridleyi (King) A.P.Davis
- Chassalia simplex K.Krause
- Chassalia singapurensis (Ridl.) A.P.Davis
- Chassalia staintonii (H.Hara) Deb & Mondal
- Chassalia stenantha Bremek.
- Chassalia stenothyrsa Bremek.
- Chassalia subcordatifolia (De Wild.) Piesschaert
- Chassalia subcoriacea (Ridl.) A.P.Davis
- Chassalia subherbacea (Hiern) Hepper
- Chassalia subnuda (Hiern) Hepper
- Chassalia subochreata (De Wild.) Robyns
- Chassalia subspicata K.Schum.
- Chassalia tahanica (I.M.Turner) A.P.Davis
- Chassalia tchibangensis Pellegr.
- Chassalia ternifolia (Baker) Bremek.
- Chassalia tricepa (Ridl.) A.P.Davis
- Chassalia tsaratanensis Bremek.
- Chassalia ugandensis Verdc.
- Chassalia umbraticola Vatke
- Chassalia vanderystii (De Wild.) Verdc.
- Chassalia vernosa Boivin ex Bremek.
- Chassalia verticillata Bremek.
- Chassalia violacea K.Schum.
- Chassalia virgata Talbot
- Chassalia zenkeri K.Schum.
- Chassalia zimmermannii Verdc.
