= Emetine =

Chemical compound

Clinical data
- AHFS/Drugs.com: International Drug Names
- ATC code: P01AX02 (WHO) QP51AX02 (WHO)

Identifiers
- IUPAC name: (2S,3R,11bS)-2-{[(1R)-6,7-Dimethoxy-1,2,3,4- tetrahydroisoquinolin-1-yl]methyl}-3-ethyl-9,10- dimethoxy-2,3,4,6,7,11b-hexahydro-1H-pyrido [2,1-a]isoquinoline
- CAS Number: 483-18-1
- PubChem CID: 10219
- ChemSpider: 9802
- UNII: X8D5EPO80M
- KEGG: C09421
- ChEBI: CHEBI:4781
- ChEMBL: ChEMBL50588
- CompTox Dashboard (EPA): DTXSID5022980
- ECHA InfoCard: 100.006.903

Chemical and physical data
- Formula: C_{29}H_{40}N_{2}O_{4}
- Molar mass: 480.649 g·mol^{−1}
- 3D model (JSmol): Interactive image
- Melting point: 74 °C (165 °F)
- SMILES: O(c1cc2c(cc1OC)[C@H](NCC2)C[C@H]5C[C@H]4c3c(cc(OC)c(OC)c3)CCN4C[C@@H]5CC)C
- InChI: InChI=1S/C29H40N2O4/c1-6-18-17-31-10-8-20-14-27(33-3)29(35-5)16-23(20)25(31)12-21(18)11-24-22-15-28(34-4)26(32-2)13-19(22)7-9-30-24/h13-16,18,21,24-25,30H,6-12,17H2,1-5H3/t18-,21-,24+,25-/m0/s1; Key:AUVVAXYIELKVAI-CKBKHPSWSA-N

Emetine is a drug used as both an anti-protozoal and to induce vomiting. It is produced from the ipecac root. It takes its name from its emetic properties.

== Early preparations ==
Mechanism of action of emetine was studied by François Magendie during the nineteenth century.

Early use of emetine was in the form of oral administration of the extract of ipecac root, or ipecacuanha. This extract was originally thought to contain only one alkaloid, emetine, but was found to contain several, including cephaeline, psychotrine and others. Although this therapy was reportedly successful, the extract caused vomiting in many patients, which reduced its utility. In some cases, it was given with opioids to reduce nausea. Other approaches to reduce nausea involved coated tablets, allowing the drug to be released after digestion in the stomach.

== Use as anti-amoebic ==
The identification of emetine as more potent than ipecac extract improved the treatment of amoebiasis. While use of emetine still caused nausea, it was more effective than the crude extract of ipecac root. Additionally, emetine could be administered hypodermically which still produced nausea, but not to the degree experienced in oral administration.

Although it is a potent antiprotozoal, the drug also can interfere with muscle contractions, leading to cardiac failure in some cases. Because of this, in some uses it is required to be administered in a hospital so that adverse events can be addressed.

== Dehydroemetine ==
Dehydroemetine is a synthetically produced antiprotozoal agent similar to emetine in its anti-amoebic properties and structure (they differ only in a double bond next to the ethyl group), but it produces fewer side effects.

== Cephaeline ==
Cephaeline is a desmethyl analog of emetine also found in ipecac root.

== Use in blocking protein synthesis ==
Emetine dihydrochloro hydrate is used in the laboratory to block protein synthesis in eukaryotic cells. It does this by binding to the 40S subunit of the ribosome. This can thus be used in the study of protein degradation in cells. Mutants resistant to emetine are altered in the 40S ribosomal subunit (S14 protein), and they exhibit cross-resistance to cryptopleurine, tylocrebrine, cephaeline and tubulosine, but not other inhibitors of protein synthesis. The compounds to which these mutants exhibit cross-resistance have been shown to share common structural determinants with emetine that are responsible for their biological activities.

== Biosynthesis ==
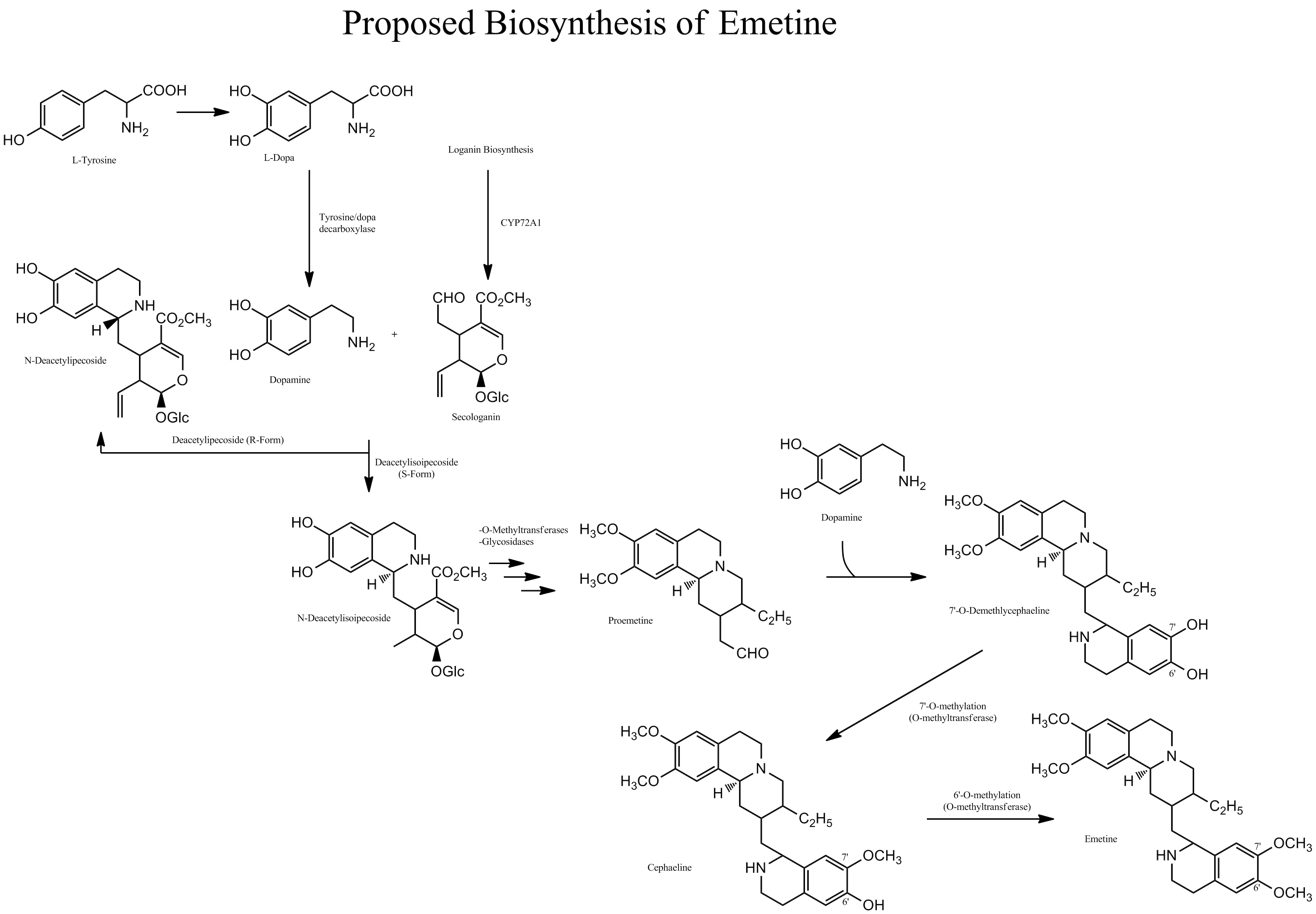
Proposed biosynthesis of emetine

The biosynthesis of cephaeline and emetine come from two main biosynthesis pathways: the biosynthesis of dopamine from L-tyrosine and the biosynthesis of secologanin from geranyl diphosphate. Biosynthesis begins from a Pictet-Spengler reaction of dopamine and secologanin forming N-deacetylisoipecoside (S-form) and N-deacetylipecoside (R-form). The S-form then goes through a series of reactions including O-methylations, deglucosylation and reduction to form protoemetine. Protoemetine then reacts with another dopamine molecule to form 7'-O-demethylcephaeline. The final products are then produced with a 7'-O-methylation to make cephaeline and a 6'-O-methylation successively to make emetine.

== Side effects ==
Heavy or overusage of emetine can carry the risk of developing proximal myopathy and/or cardiomyopathy.

== Research ==
A 2018 study at Princeton University and Thomas Jefferson University has demonstrated that emetine blocks the dissemination of rabies virus inside nerve cells, but the exact mechanism is still under investigation. Emetine had no effect on the transport of endosomes devoid of the rabies virus. (Rabies resides in nerve endosomes). But endosomes carrying the virus were either completely immobilized, or were only able to move short distances at slower-than-normal speeds.

In 2016, a study found that low doses of emetine inhibited cytomegalovirus replication and was synergistic with ganciclovir.
