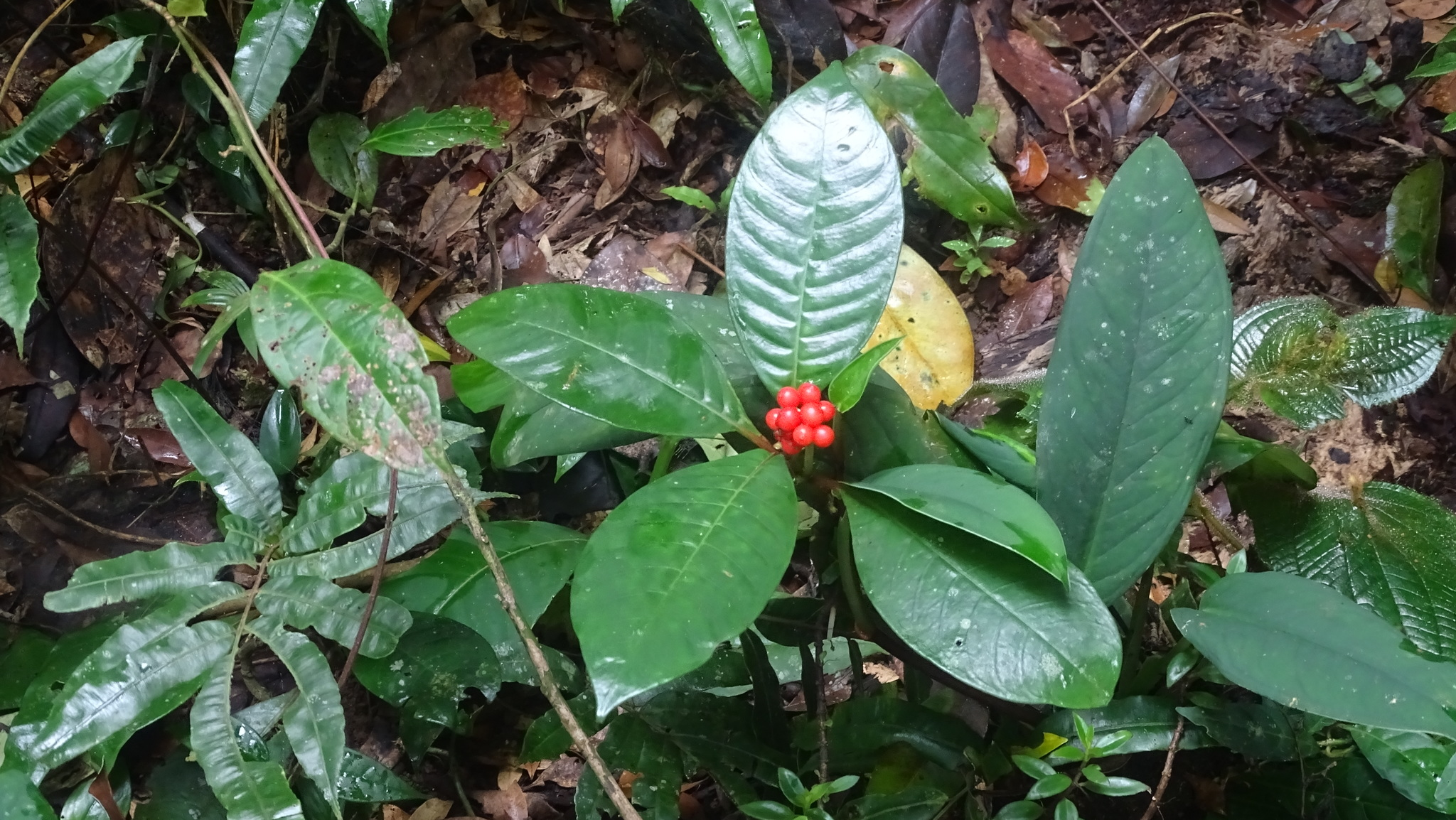
- Notopleura uliginosa

Scientific classification
- Kingdom: Plantae
- Clade: Embryophytes
- Clade: Tracheophytes
- Clade: Angiosperms
- Clade: Eudicots
- Clade: Asterids
- Order: Gentianales
- Family: Rubiaceae
- Subfamily: Rubioideae
- Tribe: Palicoureeae
- Genus: Notopleura (Hook.f.) Bremek.

Species
- See text

Synonyms
- Montamans Dwyer; Viscoides Jacq.

= Notopleura (plant) =

Genus of flowering plants

Notopleura is a genus of flowering plants in the family Rubiaceae, native to Central America, the Caribbean, and northern South America. They tend to be subshrubs, herbs and epiphytes.

== Species ==
Currently accepted species include:

- Notopleura acuta C.M.Taylor
- Notopleura aequatoriana C.M.Taylor
- Notopleura aggregata (Standl.) C.M.Taylor
- Notopleura agostinii (Steyerm.) C.M.Taylor
- Notopleura albens C.M.Taylor
- Notopleura aligera (Steyerm.) C.M.Taylor
- Notopleura amicitiae C.M.Taylor
- Notopleura aneurophylla (Standl.) C.M.Taylor
- Notopleura aneurophylloides (Steyerm.) C.M.Taylor
- Notopleura angustissima (Standl.) C.M.Taylor
- Notopleura anomothyrsa (K.Schum. & Donn.Sm.) C.M.Taylor
- Notopleura araguensis (Steyerm.) C.M.Taylor
- Notopleura bahiensis C.M.Taylor
- Notopleura biloba C.M.Taylor
- Notopleura bryophila C.M.Taylor
- Notopleura callejasii C.M.Taylor
- Notopleura camponutans (Dwyer & M.V.Hayden) C.M.Taylor
- Notopleura capacifolia (Dwyer) C.M.Taylor
- Notopleura capitata C.M.Taylor
- Notopleura chapensis (Steyerm.) C.M.Taylor
- Notopleura cincinalis C.M.Taylor
- Notopleura cocleensis C.M.Taylor
- Notopleura congesta C.M.Taylor
- Notopleura corniculata C.M.Taylor
- Notopleura corymbosa C.M.Taylor
- Notopleura costaricensis C.M.Taylor
- Notopleura crassa (Benth.) C.M.Taylor
- Notopleura cundinamarcana C.M.Taylor
- Notopleura decurrens (Steyerm.) C.M.Taylor
- Notopleura discolor (Griseb.) C.M.Taylor
- Notopleura dukei (Dwyer) C.M.Taylor
- Notopleura epiphytica (K.Krause) C.M.Taylor
- Notopleura episcandens C.M.Taylor & Lorence
- Notopleura fernandezii (Steyerm.) C.M.Taylor
- Notopleura hondurensis C.M.Taylor
- Notopleura humensis (Steyerm.) C.M.Taylor
- Notopleura hurtadoi C.M.Taylor
- Notopleura hypolaevis C.M.Taylor
- Notopleura iridescens C.M.Taylor
- Notopleura lanosa C.M.Taylor
- Notopleura lateralis (Steyerm.) C.M.Taylor
- Notopleura lateriflora (Standl.) C.M.Taylor
- Notopleura latistipula (Standl.) C.M.Taylor
- Notopleura leucantha (K.Krause) C.M.Taylor
- Notopleura longiflora C.M.Taylor
- Notopleura longipedunculoides (C.M.Taylor) C.M.Taylor
- Notopleura longissima Bremek.
- Notopleura macrophylla (Ruiz & Pav.) C.M.Taylor
- Notopleura macropodantha (Standl.) C.M.Taylor
- Notopleura madida (Standl.) C.M.Taylor
- Notopleura marginata (Benth.) Bullock
- Notopleura maxonii (Standl.) C.M.Taylor
- Notopleura merumensis (Steyerm.) C.M.Taylor
- Notopleura micayensis (Standl.) Bremek.
- Notopleura microbracteata (Steyerm.) C.M.Taylor
- Notopleura montana C.M.Taylor
- Notopleura multinervia C.M.Taylor
- Notopleura multiramosa (Steyerm.) C.M.Taylor
- Notopleura nepokroeffiae C.M.Taylor
- Notopleura obtusa C.M.Taylor
- Notopleura pacorana C.M.Taylor
- Notopleura palestinae (Standl. ex Steyerm.) C.M.Taylor
- Notopleura panamensis (Dwyer) C.M.Taylor
- Notopleura parasiggersiana C.M.Taylor
- Notopleura parasitica (Sw.) Hammel
- Notopleura parvifolia C.M.Taylor
- Notopleura patria (Standl. & Steyerm.) C.M.Taylor
- Notopleura penduliflora C.M.Taylor
- Notopleura peperomiae (Standl.) C.M.Taylor
- Notopleura perpapillifera (Steyerm.) C.M.Taylor
- Notopleura perparva (Dwyer) C.M.Taylor
- Notopleura pilosula C.M.Taylor
- Notopleura pithecobia (Standl.) C.M.Taylor
- Notopleura plagiantha (Standl.) C.M.Taylor
- Notopleura polyphlebia (Donn.Sm.) C.M.Taylor
- Notopleura pyramidata C.M.Taylor
- Notopleura recondita Hammel & C.M.Taylor
- Notopleura sallydavidsoniae R.Flores & C.M.Taylor
- Notopleura sanblasensis C.M.Taylor
- Notopleura saulensis (Steyerm.) C.M.Taylor
- Notopleura scarlatina C.M.Taylor
- Notopleura siggersiana (Standl.) C.M.Taylor
- Notopleura spiciformis C.M.Taylor
- Notopleura standleyana (Steyerm.) C.M.Taylor
- Notopleura steyermarkiana C.M.Taylor
- Notopleura subimbricata (Steyerm.) C.M.Taylor
- Notopleura submarginalis C.M.Taylor
- Notopleura sucrensis (Steyerm.) C.M.Taylor
- Notopleura tapajozensis (Standl.) Bremek.
- Notopleura terepaimensis (Steyerm.) C.M.Taylor
- Notopleura thesceloantha (Steyerm.) C.M.Taylor
- Notopleura tolimensis (Wernham) C.M.Taylor
- Notopleura tonduzii (Standl.) C.M.Taylor
- Notopleura torrana C.M.Taylor
- Notopleura triaxillaris C.M.Taylor
- Notopleura tubulistipula C.M.Taylor
- Notopleura uberta (Standl. & Steyerm.) C.M.Taylor
- Notopleura uliginosa (Sw.) Bremek.
- Notopleura vargasiana C.M.Taylor
- Notopleura wilburiana (Dwyer) C.M.Taylor
- Notopleura zarucchiana C.M.Taylor
