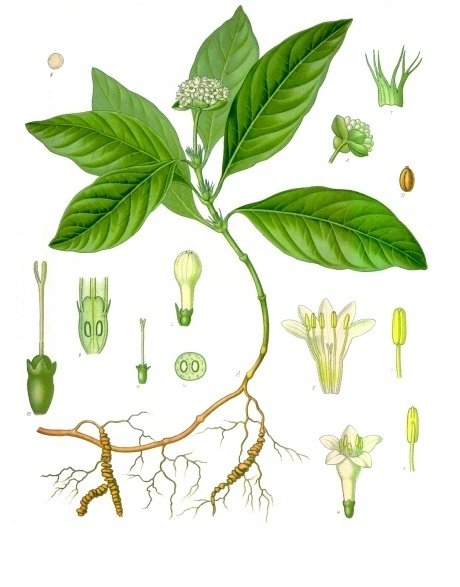

Scientific classification
- Kingdom: Plantae
- Clade: Tracheophytes
- Clade: Angiosperms
- Clade: Eudicots
- Clade: Asterids
- Order: Gentianales
- Family: Rubiaceae
- Genus: Carapichea
- Species: C. ipecacuanha

Binomial name
- Carapichea ipecacuanha (Brot.) L.Andersson

Synonyms
- Callicocca ipecacuanha Cephaelis ipecacuanha Evea ipecacuanha Psychotria ipecacuanha Uragoga ipecacuanha

= Carapichea ipecacuanha =

Species of flowering plant

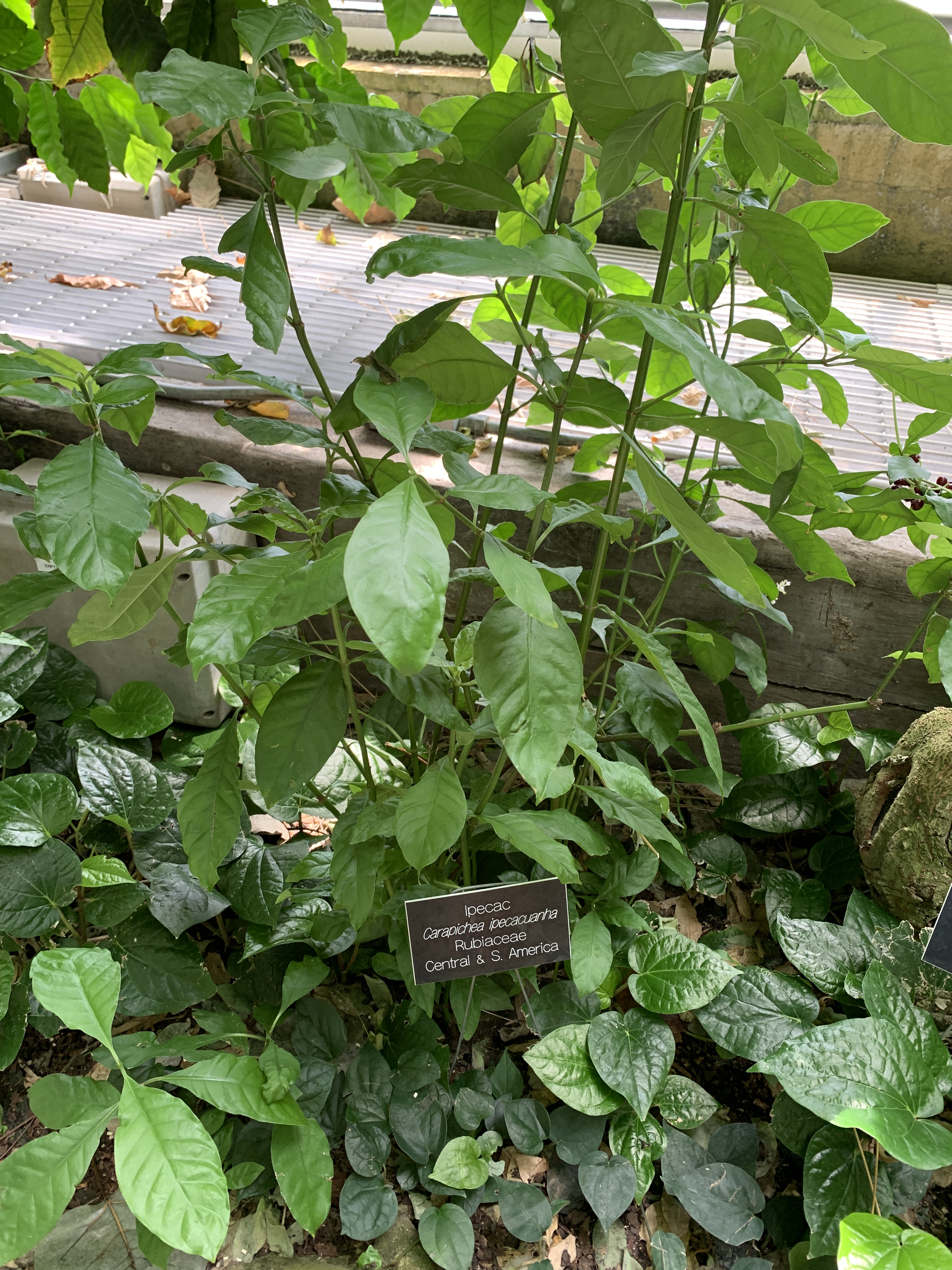
Ipecac plant

Carapichea ipecacuanha is a species of flowering plant in the family Rubiaceae. It is native to Costa Rica, Nicaragua, Panama, Colombia, and Brazil. Its common name, ipecacuanha (Portuguese pronunciation: [ipekɐkuˈɐ̃ɲɐ]), is derived from the Tupi ypekakûãîa (lit. 'duck penis'). The plant has been discussed under a variety of synonyms over the years by various botanists. The roots were used to make syrup of ipecac, a powerful emetic, a longtime over-the-counter medicine no longer approved for medical use in the West for lack of evidence of safety and efficacy. An example of emetic compound from the roots is emetine.

== Description ==
Ipecacuanha is a slow-growing plant, which reduces its commercial appeal as a crop plant. It is seldom cultivated in South America but it has been cultivated in India and elsewhere.

The root of ipecacuanha has been used in preparation of the medicament, the syrup, is simple or divided into a few branches, flexuous, and composed of rings of various size. It is somewhat fleshy when fresh, and appearing as if closely strung on a central woody cord. The different kinds known in commerce (gray, red, brown) are all produced by the same plant, the differences arising from the age of the plant, the mode of drying, etc. Various other plants can be used as substitutes for it.

== History ==
Ipecacuanha was known to Europe by the mid 17th century. Nicholas Culpeper, an English botanist, herbalist, and physician, compared Ipecacuanha to the herb Orach in his book, Complete Herbal & English Physician, published in 1653. One of the first recorded shipments of Ipecacuanha to Europe was in 1672, by a traveler named Legros, who imported a quantity of the root to Paris from South America. In 1680, a Parisian merchant named Garnier possessed some 68 kilograms (150 pounds) of the substance and informed the physician Jean Claude Adrien Helvetius (1685–1755, father of Claude-Adrien Helvétius) of its power in the treatment of dysentery. Helvetius was granted sole right to vend the remedy by Louis XIV, but sold the secret to the French government, who made the formula public in 1688.

Ipecacuanha has a long history of use as an emetic, for emptying the stomach in cases of poisoning, a use that has been discontinued in medical settings (see syrup of ipecac). It has also been used as a nauseant, expectorant, and diaphoretic, and was prescribed for conditions such as bronchitis. The most common and familiar preparation is syrup of ipecac, which was commonly recommended as an emergency treatment for accidental poisoning until the final years of the 20th century. Ipecacuanha was also traditionally used to induce sweating. A common preparation for this purpose was Dover's powder.

In the 19th century, women prisoners at the Cascades Female Factory, Tasmania, were routinely given "a grain or so of ipecacuanha" as a precaution, especially "upon ladies with gross health and fiery temperaments."

== Chemical constituents ==
Ipecacuanha contains the alkaloids emetine (methylcephaeline) and cephaeline. It also contains the pseudo-tannin ipecacuanhic acid or cephaëlic acid.
