= Glaber =

Glaber, a Latin word meaning "bald", may refer to:

- Arduin Glaber (died c. 977), Count of Auriate and Margrave of Turin
- Gaius Claudius Glaber, a Roman praetor in 73 BC who failed to hem in Spartacus and his fellow slaves on Mt. Vesuvius during the Third Servile War
- Rodulfus Glaber (985–1047), Benedictine monk and chronicler, one of the chief sources for the history of France in that period

== See also ==
- includes several species names
- List of Latin and Greek words commonly used in systematic names
- Glabrousness
