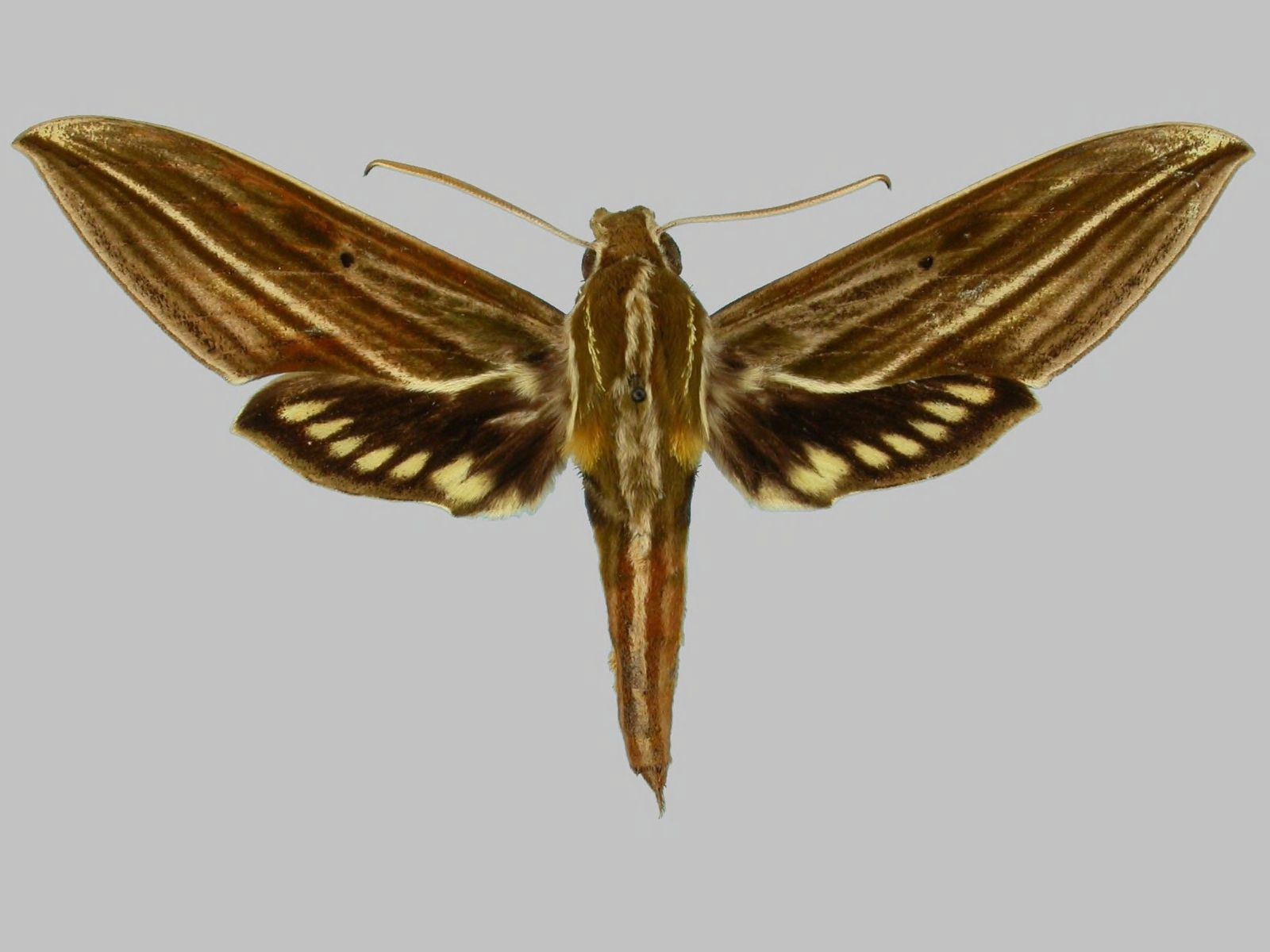

Scientific classification
- Domain: Eukaryota
- Kingdom: Animalia
- Phylum: Arthropoda
- Class: Insecta
- Order: Lepidoptera
- Family: Sphingidae
- Genus: Xylophanes
- Species: X. rhodotus

Binomial name
- Xylophanes rhodotus Rothschild, 1904

= Xylophanes rhodotus =

Species of moth

Xylophanes rhodotus is a moth of the family Sphingidae. It is known from Peru and Bolivia.

It is intermediate between Xylophanes eumedon and Xylophanes titana. The tegula has a golden medial line. The dorsal lines of the upperside of the abdomen are pale and broad and divided medially by an indistinct, thin olive-green line that becomes broader and more distinct towards the abdomen base. The black basal and yellow lateral abdominal patches are less developed than in Xylophanes eumedon. The pattern of the forewing upperside is similar to that of Xylophanes titana, but darker. The median band of the hindwing upperside consists of sharply defined and distinct pale yellow spots.

Adults are on wing in June.

The larvae probably feed on Rubiaceae and Malvaceae species.
