= Xylophanes bilineata =

Scientific classification
- Kingdom: Animalia
- Phylum: Arthropoda
- Class: Insecta
- Order: Lepidoptera
- Family: Sphingidae
- Genus: Xylophanes
- Species: X. bilineata

Binomial name
- Xylophanes bilineata Gehlen, 1928

Species of moth

Xylophanes bilineata is a moth of the family Sphingidae. It is known from Peru.

The larvae possibly feed on Psychotria panamensis, Psychotria nervosa and Pavonia guanacastensis.
