= Xylophanes ferotinus =

Scientific classification
- Domain: Eukaryota
- Kingdom: Animalia
- Phylum: Arthropoda
- Class: Insecta
- Order: Lepidoptera
- Family: Sphingidae
- Genus: Xylophanes
- Species: X. ferotinus

Binomial name
- Xylophanes ferotinus Gehlen, 1930

Species of moth

Xylophanes ferotinus is a moth of the family Sphingidae. It is known from Brazil.

The length of the forewings is about 31 mm.

Adults have been recorded from October to November in Amazonas at elevations of 1,550 meters but are probably on wing year-round.

The larvae possibly feed on Psychotria panamensis, Psychotria nervosa and Pavonia guanacastensis.
