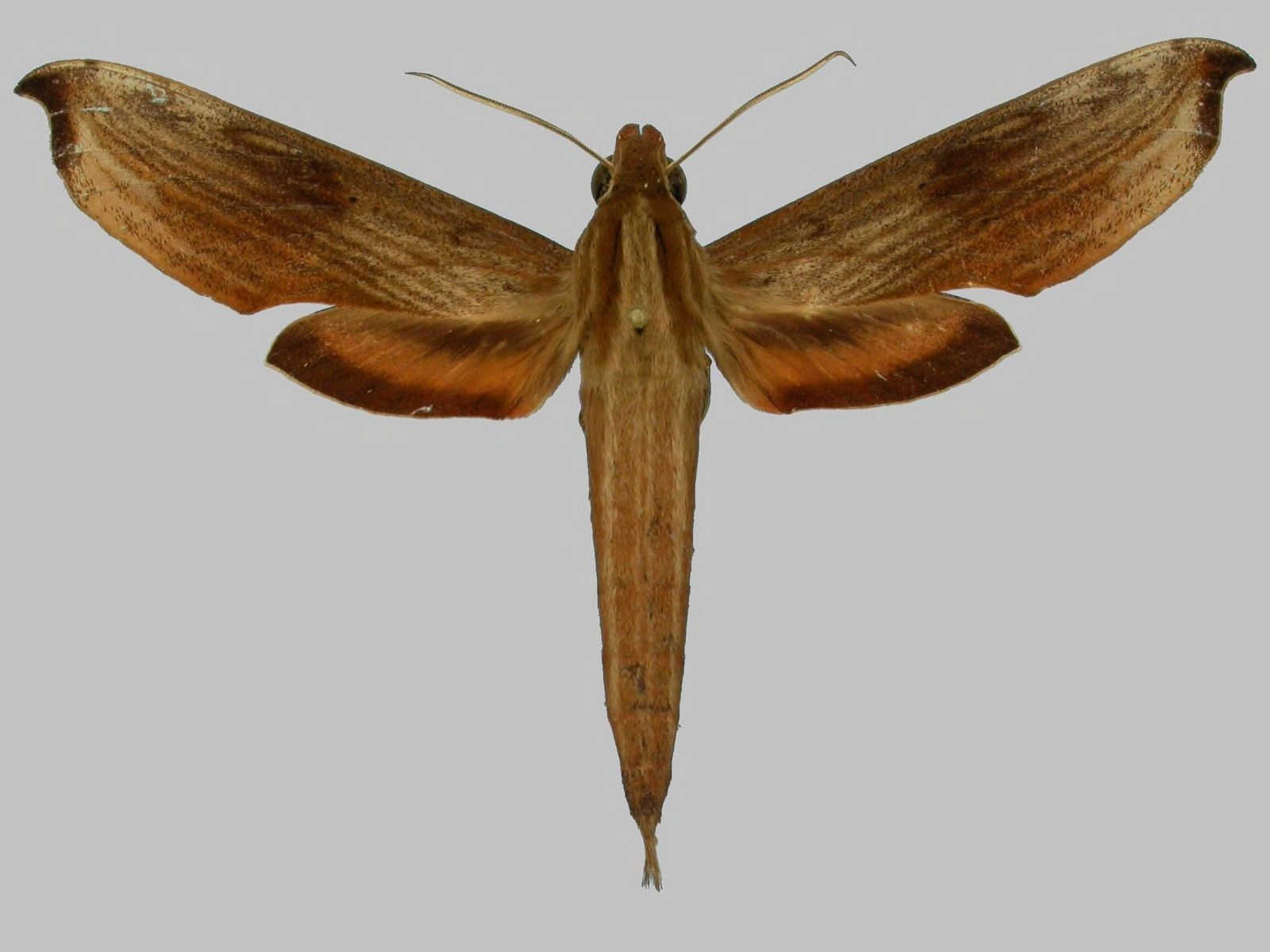

Scientific classification
- Kingdom: Animalia
- Phylum: Arthropoda
- Clade: Pancrustacea
- Class: Insecta
- Order: Lepidoptera
- Family: Sphingidae
- Genus: Xylophanes
- Species: X. haxairei

Binomial name
- Xylophanes haxairei Cadiou, 1985

= Xylophanes haxairei =

Species of moth

Xylophanes haxairei is a moth of the family Sphingidae. It is known from French Guiana and Venezuela.

The length of the forewings is 37–38 mm.

Adults are probably on wing year-round.

The larvae possibly feed on Psychotria panamensis, Psychotria nervosa and Pavonia guanacastensis.
