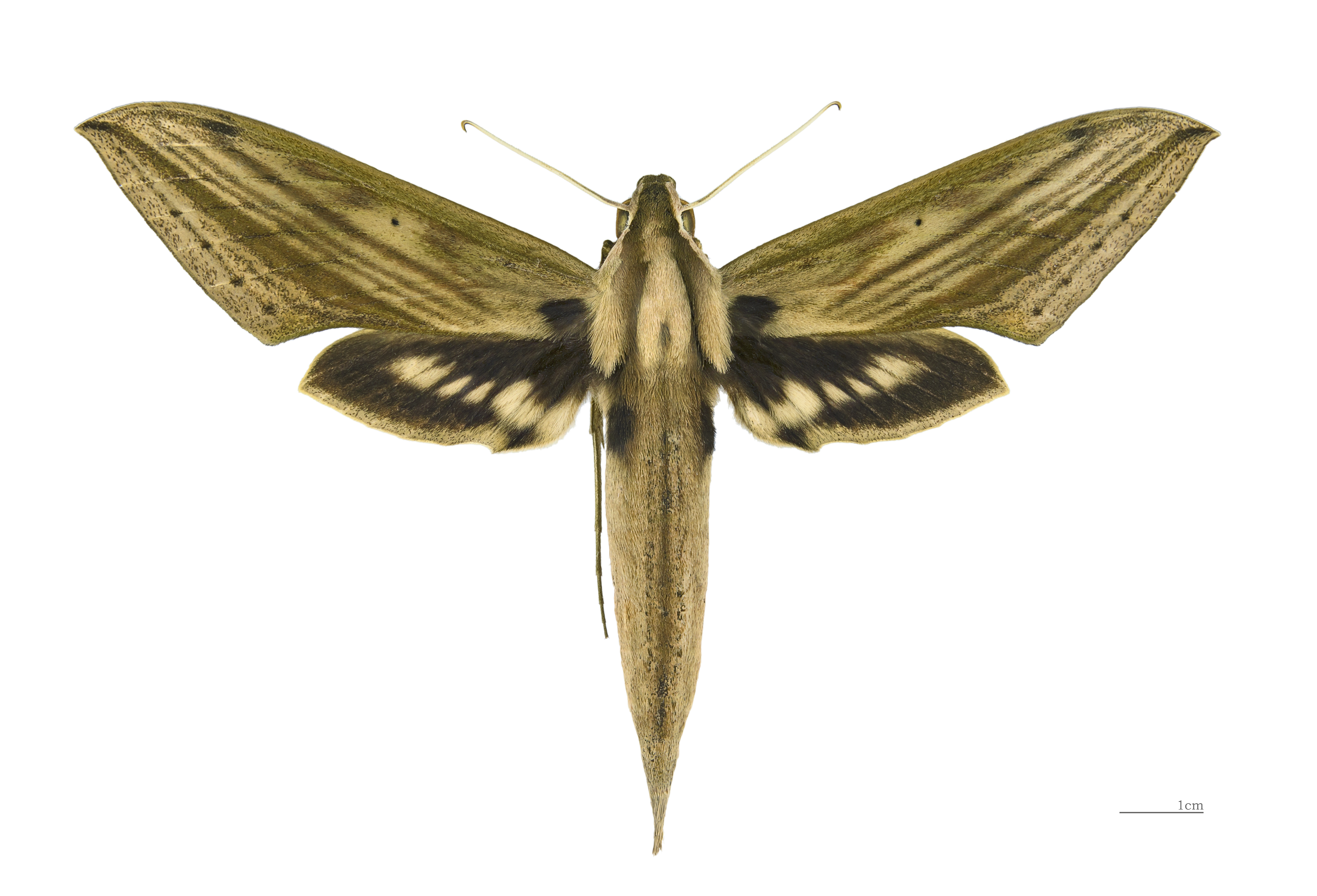
- Upperside
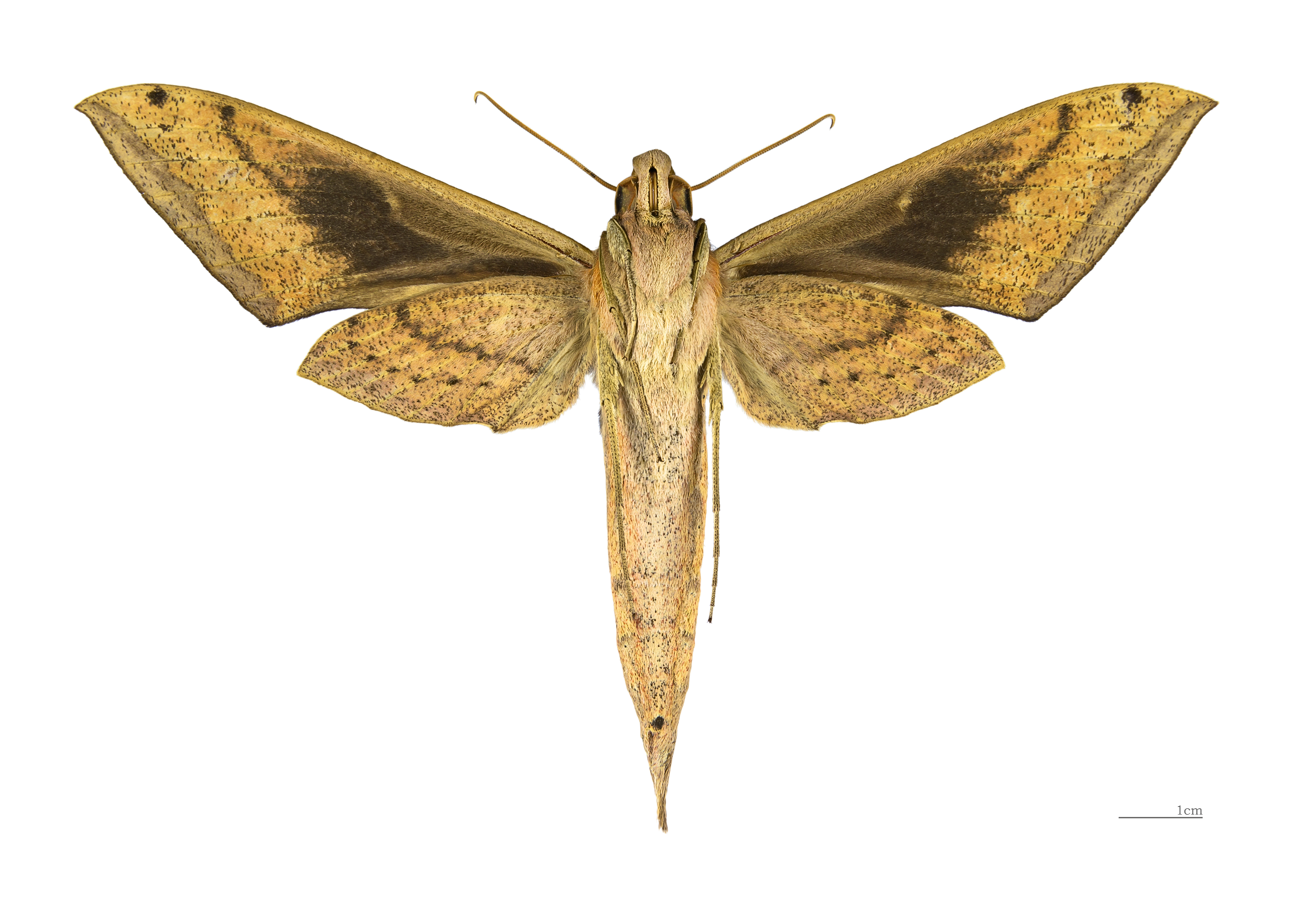
- Underside

Scientific classification
- Kingdom: Animalia
- Phylum: Arthropoda
- Class: Insecta
- Order: Lepidoptera
- Family: Sphingidae
- Genus: Xylophanes
- Species: X. anubus

Binomial name
- Xylophanes anubus (Cramer, 1777)

Synonyms
- Sphinx anubus Cramer, 1777; Choerocampa miradoris Boisduval, 1875; Choerocampa laevis Grote & Robinson, 1866; Choerocampa alcides Boisduval, 1875; Chaerocampa nitidula Clemens, 1859; Xylophanes alegrensis Closs, 1915; Xylophanes anubus infernalis Gehlen, 1926; Xylophanes anubus paraguayensis Gehlen, 1933

= Xylophanes anubus =

Species of moth

Xylophanes anubus is a moth of the family Sphingidae first described by Pieter Cramer in 1777.

== Distribution ==
It is found in Suriname, Mexico, Belize, Nicaragua, Costa Rica and south to Brazil, Bolivia and Argentina.

== Description ==
The wingspan is 97–102 mm. Females are larger than males. It is a very variable species in terms of size and degree of development of the oblique lines of the forewing upperside. The costal margin of the forewing is often rather strongly convex and the apex is recurved. The abdomen has three dorsal lines, the median line is usually the most distinct but may be absent and the lateral lines are sometimes reduced to rows of dots. The forewing upperside is either with or without a dark cloud distal to discal cell. There are seven oblique lines present of which the third is the heaviest.

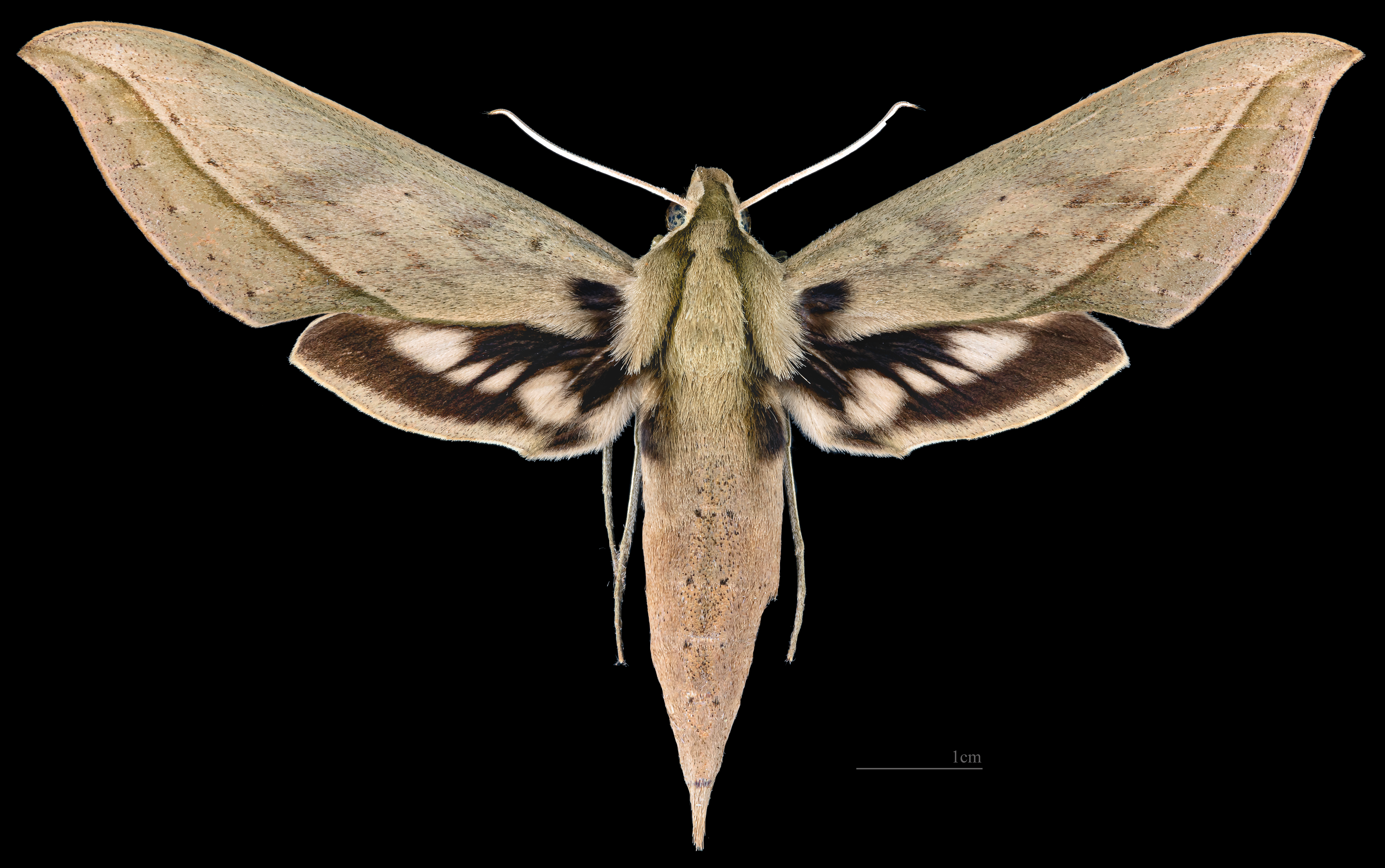
Female dorsal

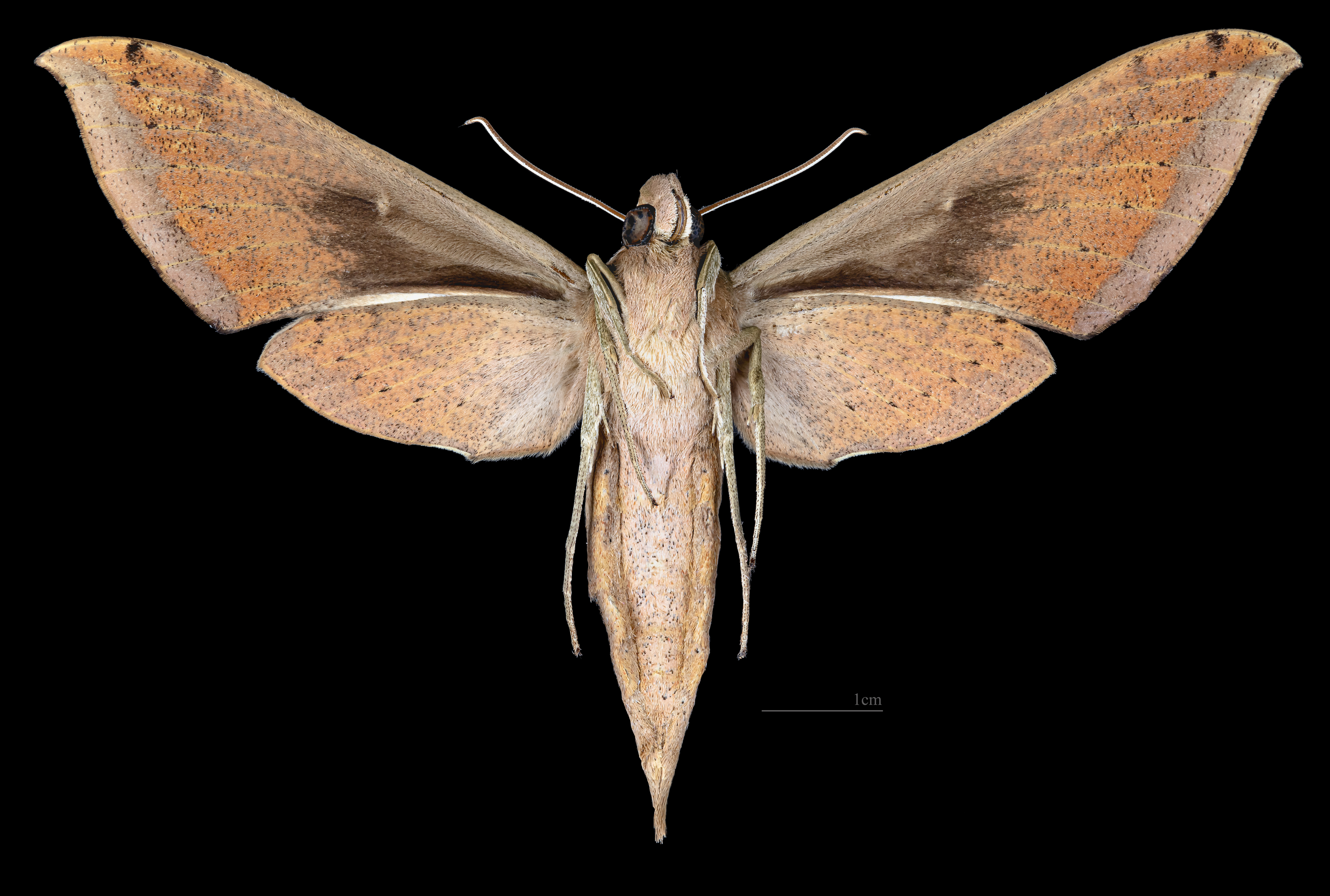
female ventral

== Biology ==
Adults are on wing year round in Costa Rica.

The larvae feed on Psychotria panamensis, Psychotria chiapensis, Psychotria psychotriifolia, Psychotria nervosa and Garrobo species.
