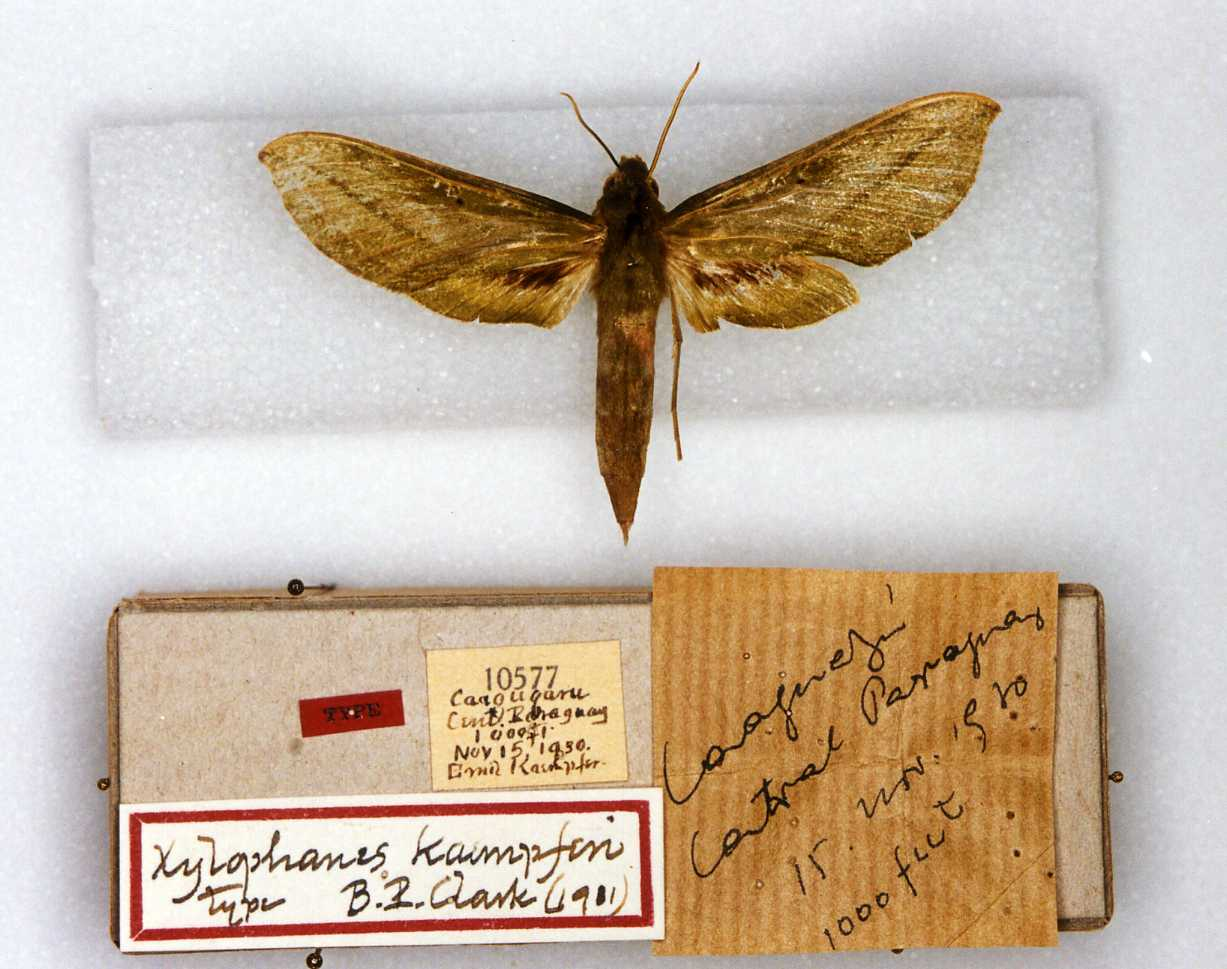

Scientific classification
- Domain: Eukaryota
- Kingdom: Animalia
- Phylum: Arthropoda
- Class: Insecta
- Order: Lepidoptera
- Family: Sphingidae
- Genus: Xylophanes
- Species: X. kaempferi

Binomial name
- Xylophanes kaempferi Clark, 1931

= Xylophanes kaempferi =

Species of moth

Xylophanes kaempferi is a moth of the family Sphingidae. It is known from Paraguay.

Adults are probably on wing year-round.

The larvae possibly feed on Psychotria panamensis, Psychotria nervosa and Pavonia guanacastensis.
