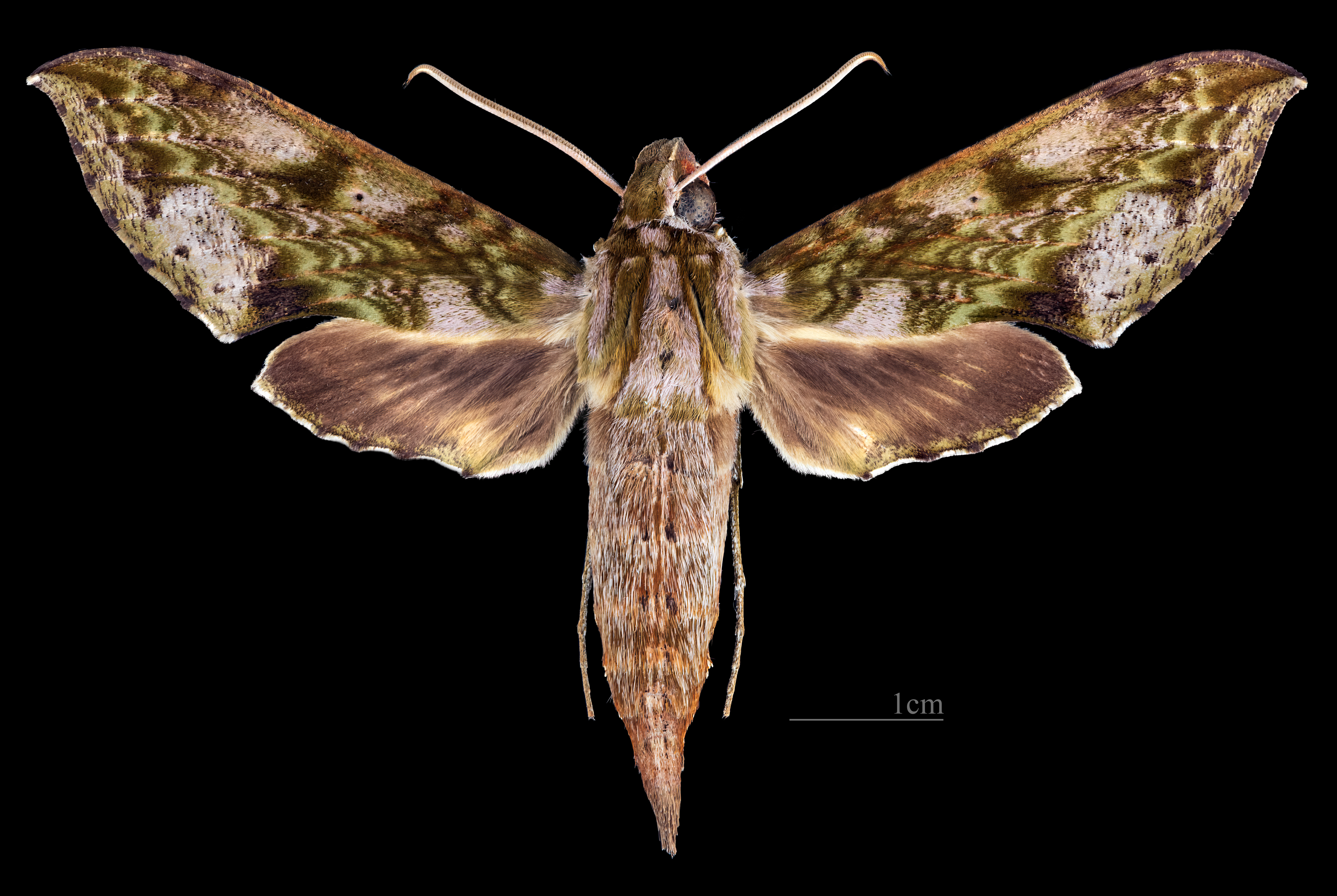
- Xylophanes fusimacula ♂
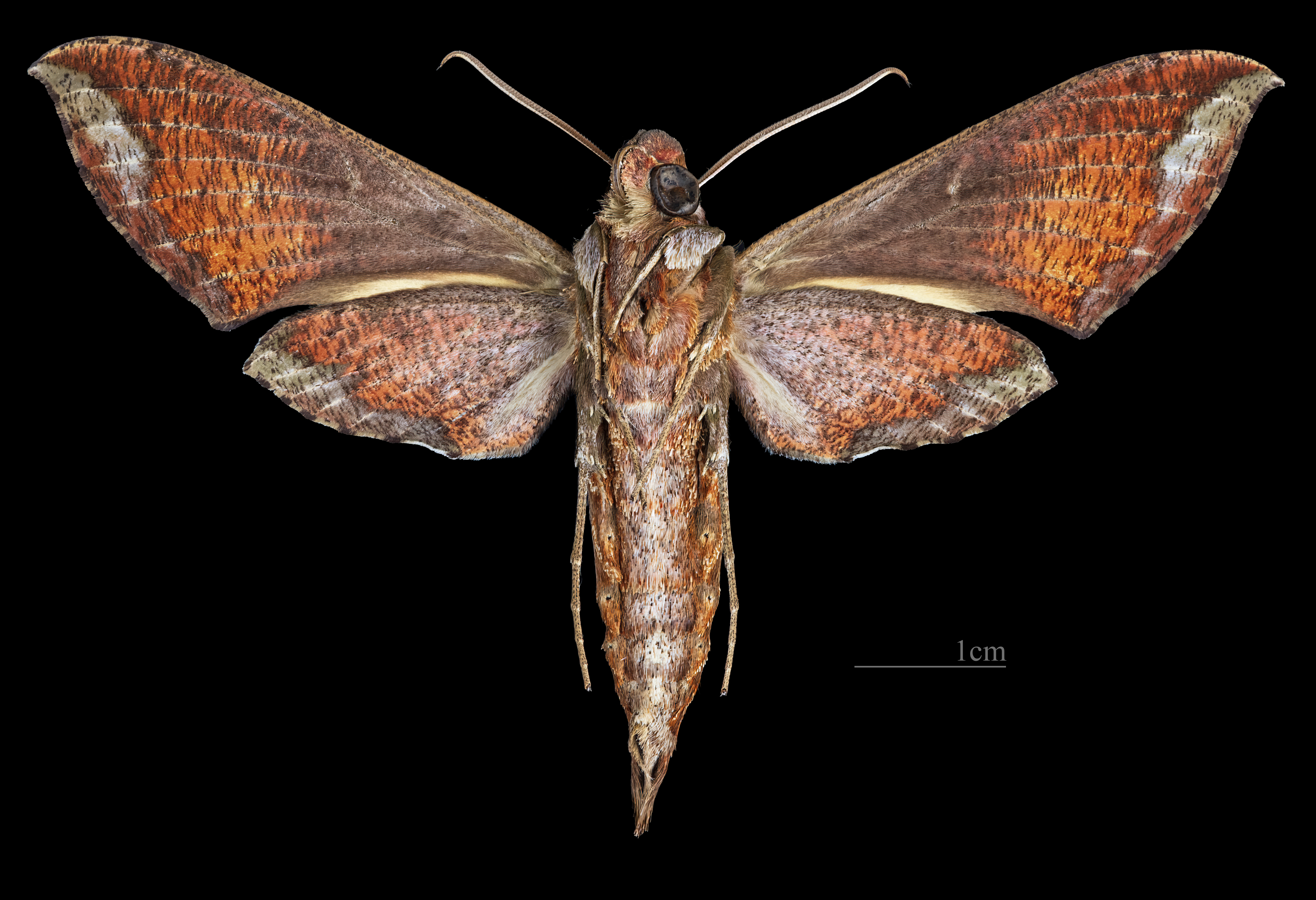
- Xylophanes fusimacula ♂ △

Scientific classification
- Domain: Eukaryota
- Kingdom: Animalia
- Phylum: Arthropoda
- Class: Insecta
- Order: Lepidoptera
- Family: Sphingidae
- Genus: Xylophanes
- Species: X. fusimacula

Binomial name
- Xylophanes fusimacula (R. Felder, 1874)

Synonyms
- Pergesa fusimacula R. Felder, 1874; Xylophanes fusimacula niepelti Gehlen, 1928

= Xylophanes fusimacula =

Species of moth

Xylophanes fusimacula is a moth of the family Sphingidae. It is found from Brazil to Colombia and Bolivia.

Adults are probably on wing year-round.

The larvae possibly feed on Psychotria panamensis, Psychotria nervosa and Pavonia guanacastensis.
