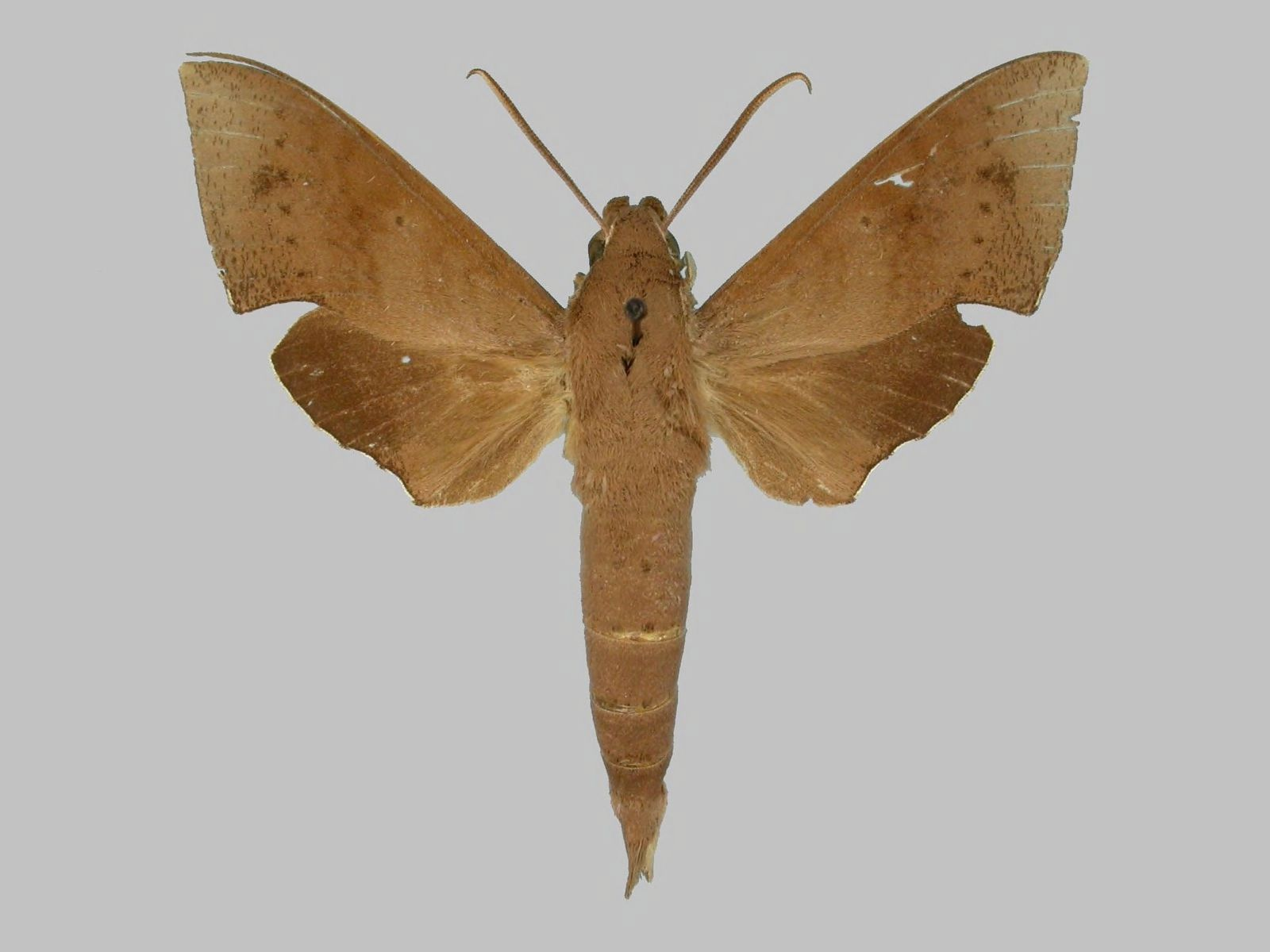

Scientific classification
- Domain: Eukaryota
- Kingdom: Animalia
- Phylum: Arthropoda
- Class: Insecta
- Order: Lepidoptera
- Family: Sphingidae
- Genus: Xylophanes
- Species: X. juanita

Binomial name
- Xylophanes juanita Rothschild & Jordan, 1903

Synonyms
- Pergesa mexicana Schaus, 1890

= Xylophanes juanita =

Species of moth

Xylophanes juanita is a moth of the family Sphingidae. It is found from Mexico and Belize to Costa Rica.

== Description ==
The wingspan is 57–59 millimetres (2.2–2.3 in). The dorsal scales of the antennae are blackish brown and pinkish latero-basally. The abdomen has two rows of dorsal dots. The lateral border of the tegulae are not well marked, anteriorly pinkish and continued to the base of the antennae. The forewing upperside has traces of one or two antemedian lines and four transverse postmedian lines are present. The first and second are distinctly undulate, while the third and fourth are faint, although the fourth is accentuated by dots on the veins and followed by a patch. The apical oblique line is indistinct. The hindwing upperside is darker brown than the forewing, becoming paler posteriorly. The fringe is white and minutely interrupted at the veins.

== Ecology ==
The larvae possibly feed on Psychotria horizontalis, Psychotria correae, Psychotria microdon and Psychotria nervosa. The false eye of the larva is divided into two parts and this is very distinctive of this species. There are several colour morphs. In one morph, the last instar has yellow eyes and a blue or green body. Adults are probably on wing year-round.
