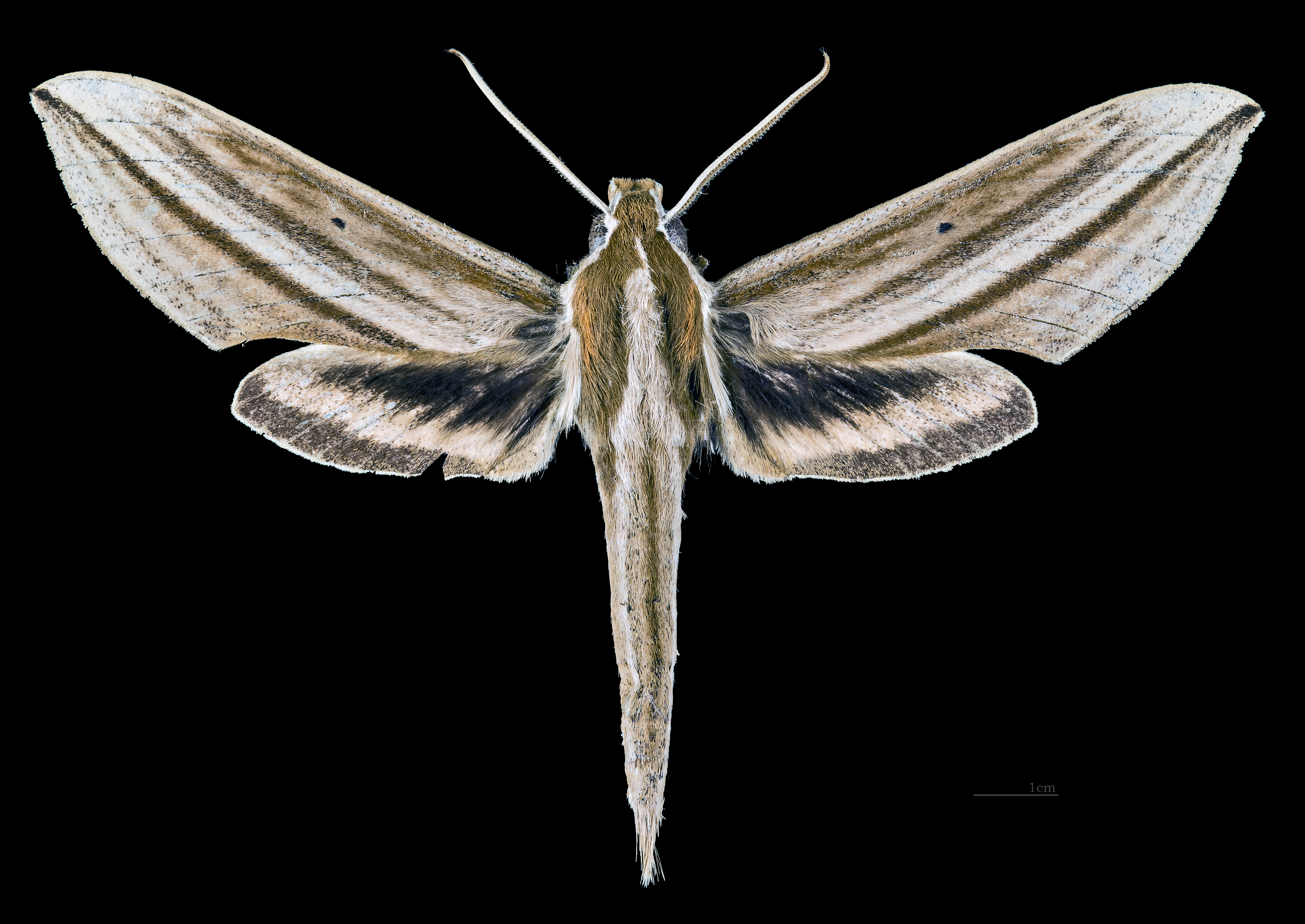
- Xylophanes isaon dorsal MHNT
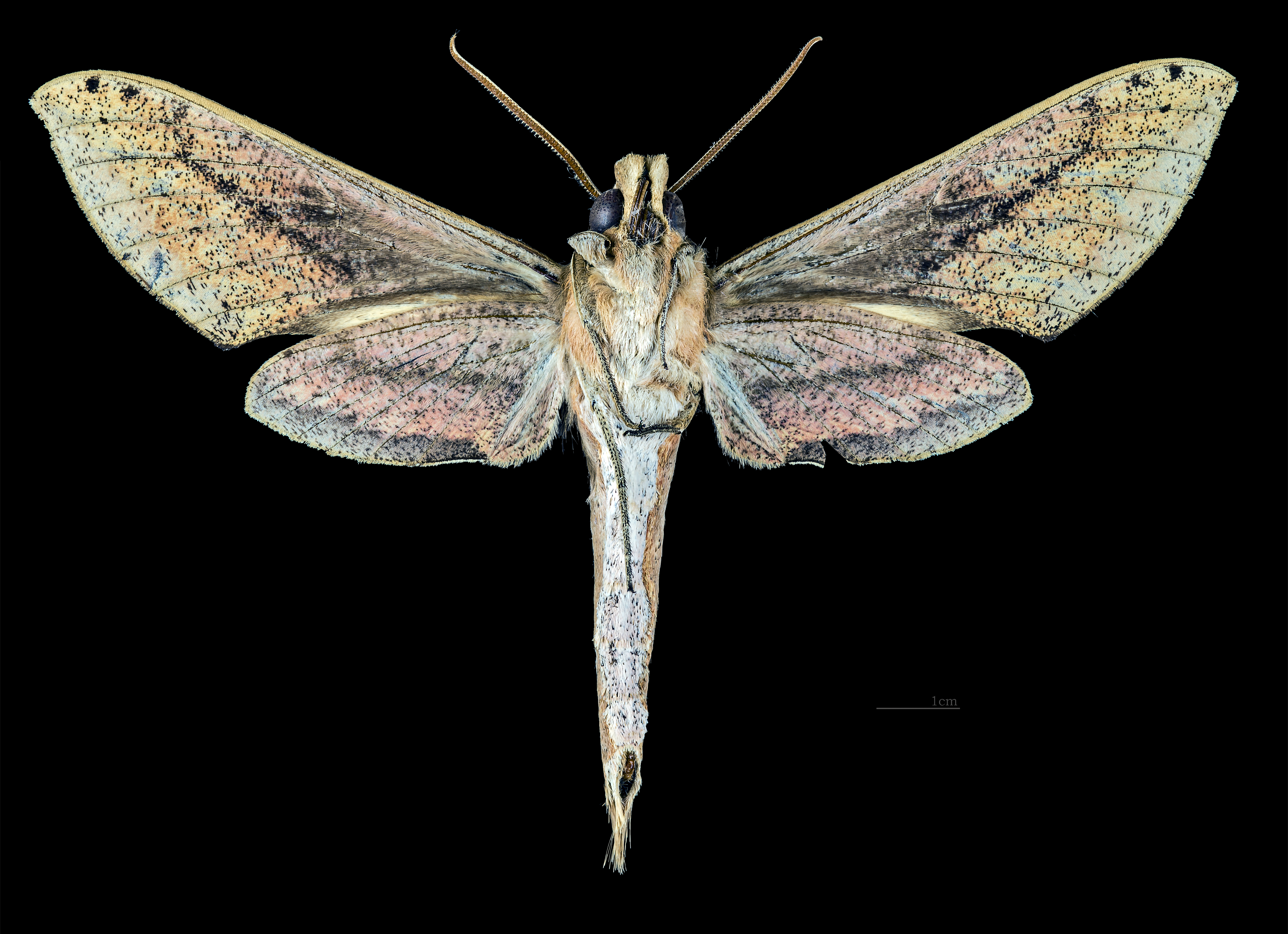
- Xylophanes isaon ventral MHNT

Scientific classification
- Domain: Eukaryota
- Kingdom: Animalia
- Phylum: Arthropoda
- Class: Insecta
- Order: Lepidoptera
- Family: Sphingidae
- Genus: Xylophanes
- Species: X. isaon

Binomial name
- Xylophanes isaon (Boisduval, 1875)

Synonyms
- Choerocampa isaon Boisduval, 1875; Theretra olivacea Rothschild, 1894

= Xylophanes isaon =

Species of moth

Xylophanes isaon is a moth of the family Sphingidae. It is found from south-eastern Brazil and Paraguay to Argentina.

The thorax has a grey medial line which widens posteriorly and is continued onto the abdomen as two widely separated but not very distinct bands. Each of these is bordered dorsally by a series of dots (that are sometimes interconnected) and a distinct brown medial line. The tegula is olive green with a golden-yellow medial line. The forewing upperside ground colour is buff with olive green bands and lines. The first to third postmedian lines start distinct but disappear later. The first line is heavier than lines two and three, but the fourth is the strongest. This line runs almost straight from the inner margin to the apex. The fifth postmedian line is diffuse and runs parallel to the fourth. The hindwing upperside is basally black. The median band is broad, pinkish-orange and the basal and distal edges are even.

Adults are probably on wing year-round.

The larvae possibly feed on Psychotria panamensis, Psychotria nervosa and Pavonia guanacastensis.
