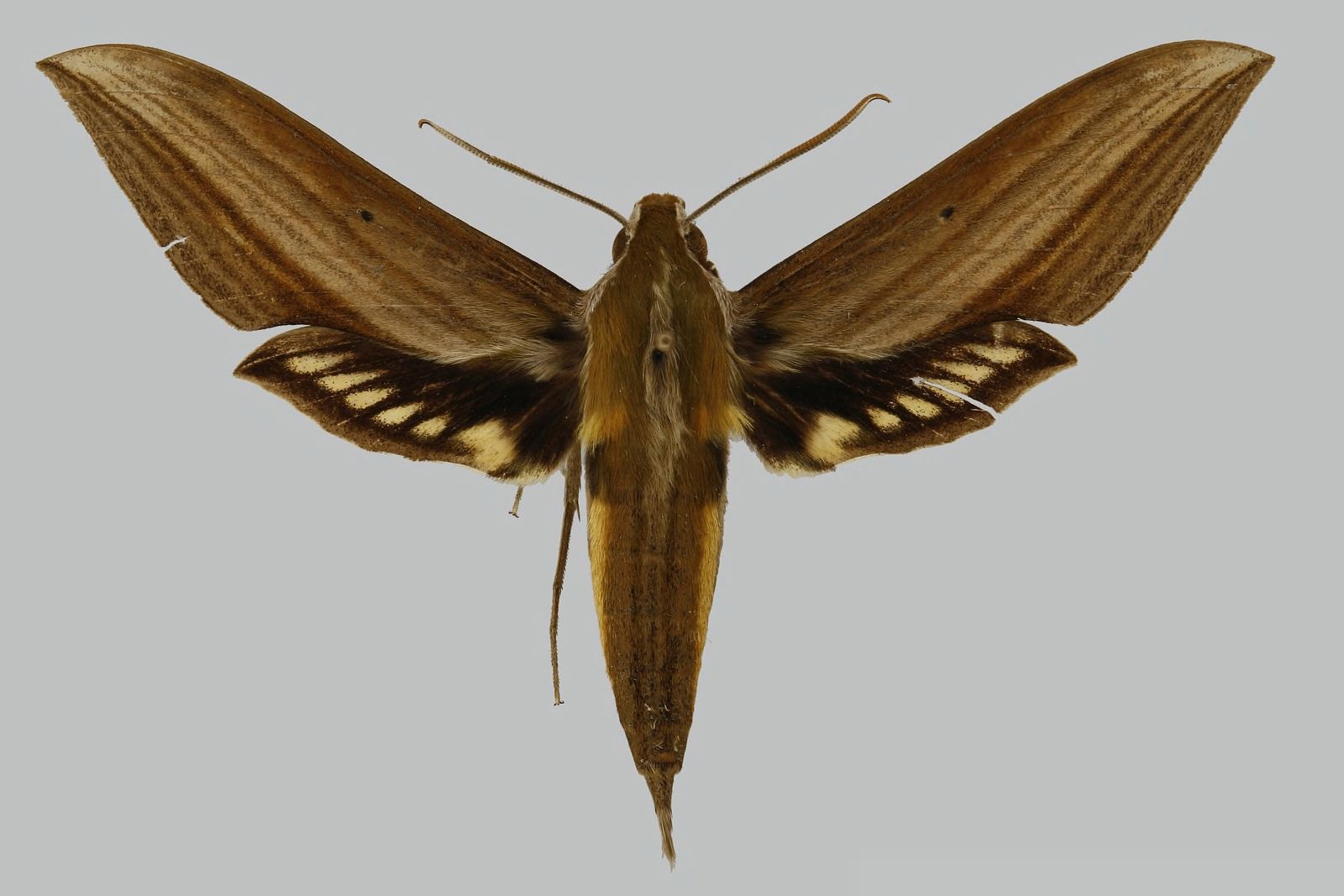

Scientific classification
- Kingdom: Animalia
- Phylum: Arthropoda
- Class: Insecta
- Order: Lepidoptera
- Family: Sphingidae
- Genus: Xylophanes
- Species: X. barbuti

Binomial name
- Xylophanes barbuti Haxaire & Eitschberger, 2007

= Xylophanes barbuti =

Species of moth

Xylophanes barbuti is a moth of the family Sphingidae. It is known from Ecuador and Peru.

The wingspan is 84–93 mm. Adults are probably on wing year-round.

The larvae possibly feed on Psychotria panamensis, Psychotria nervosa and Pavonia guanacastensis.
