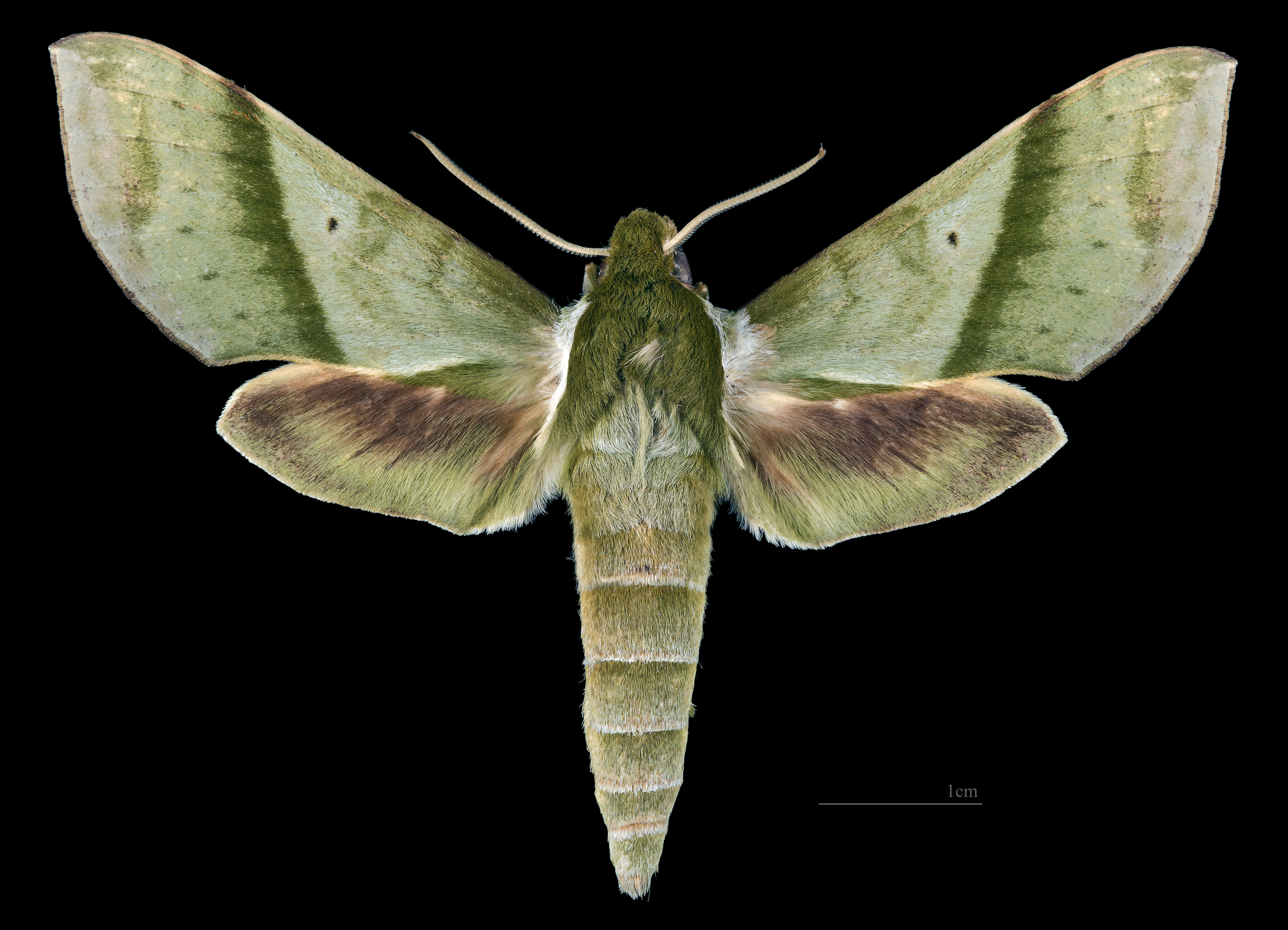
- Male dorsal
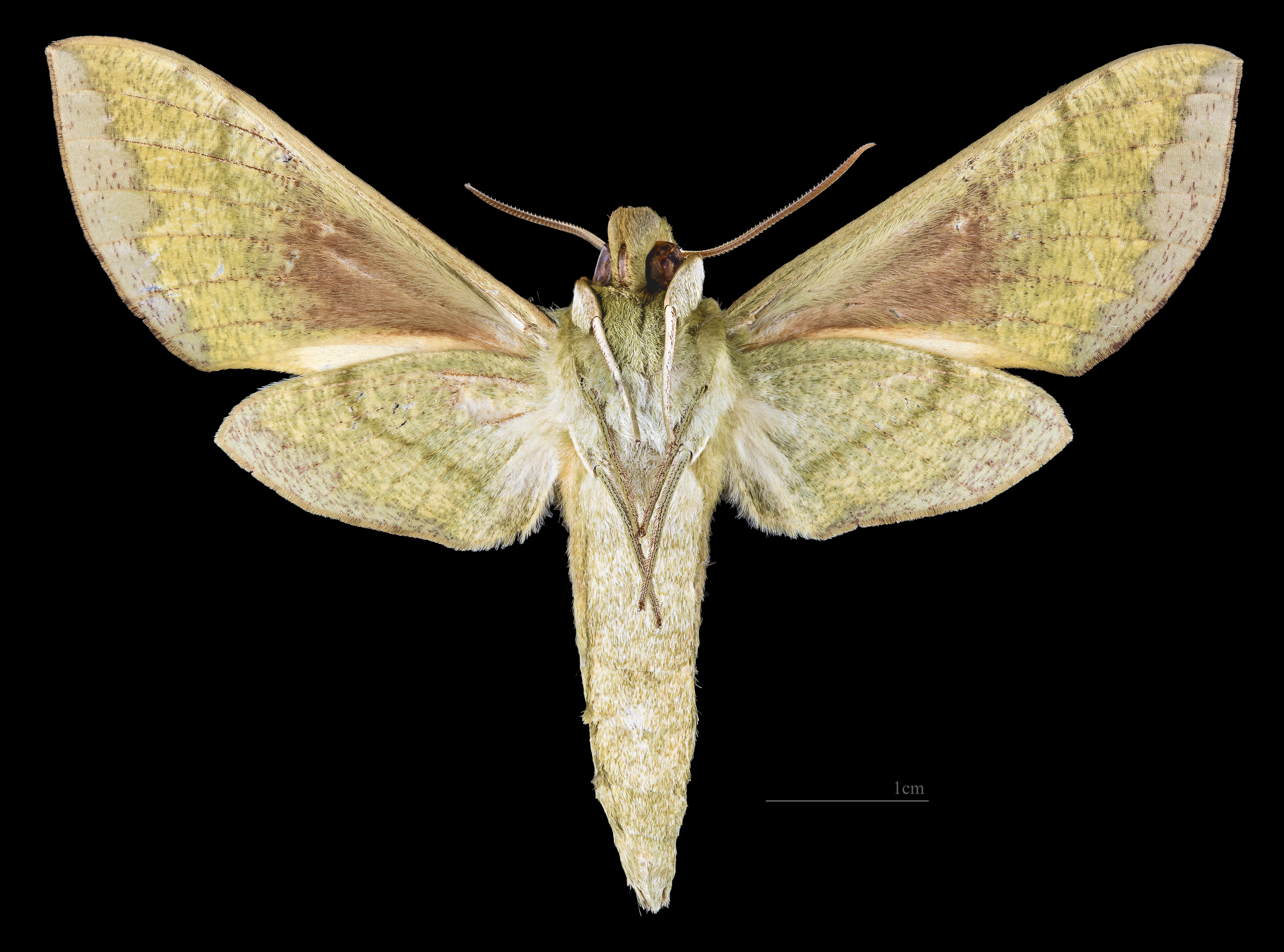
- Male ventral

Scientific classification
- Kingdom: Animalia
- Phylum: Arthropoda
- Clade: Pancrustacea
- Class: Insecta
- Order: Lepidoptera
- Family: Sphingidae
- Genus: Xylophanes
- Species: X. marginalis

Binomial name
- Xylophanes marginalis Clark, 1917

Synonyms
- Xylophanes reussi Closs, 1920; Xylophanes marginalis subtyndarus (Hoffmann, 1934)

= Xylophanes marginalis =

Species of moth

Xylophanes marginalis is a species of moth in the family Sphingidae. It is known from Brazil, Paraguay and Argentina.

The length of the forewings is about 26 mm for males and 31 mm for females.

Adults are probably on wing year-round.

The larvae possibly feed on Psychotria panamensis, Psychotria nervosa and Pavonia guanacastensis.
