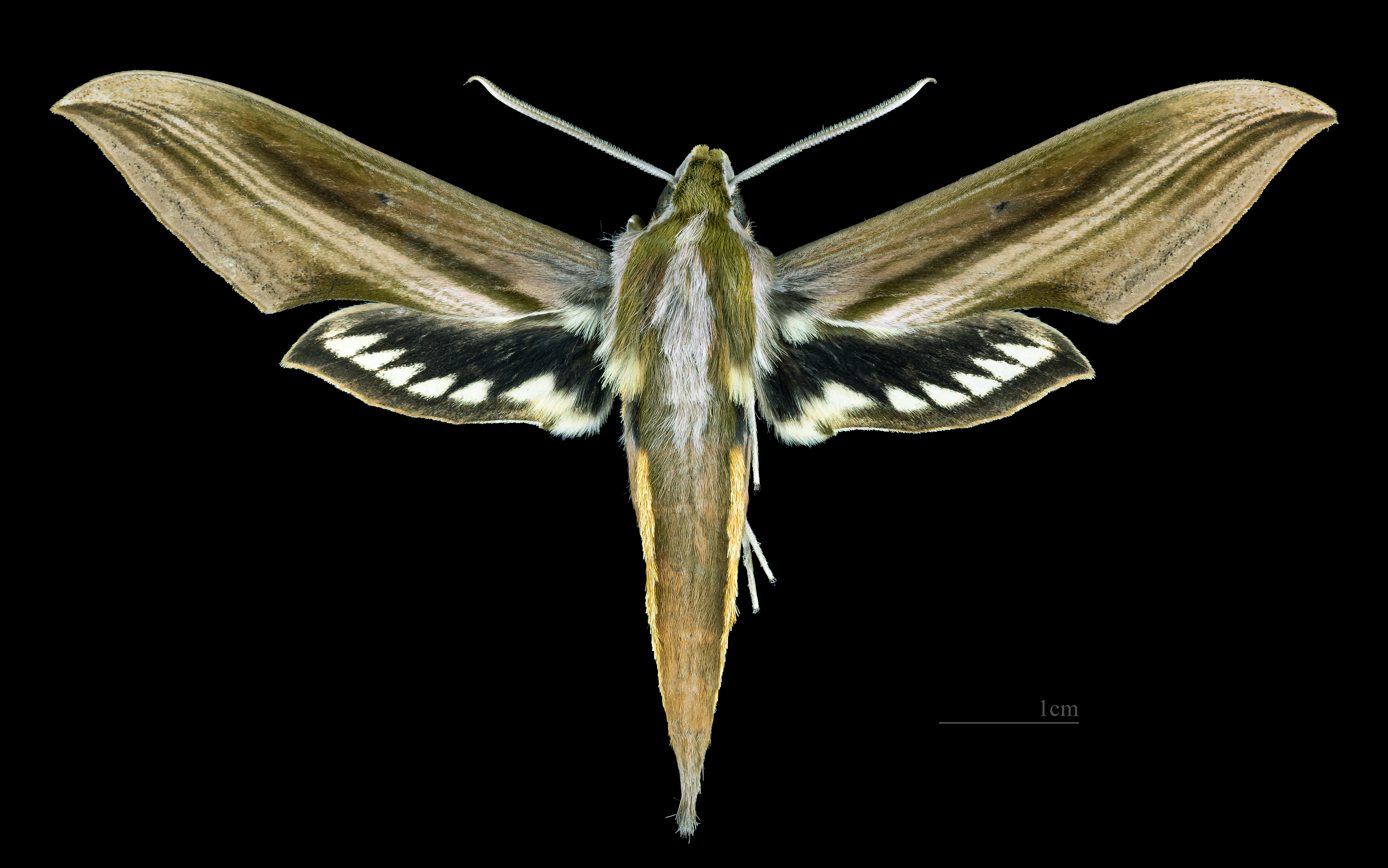
- Male dorsal
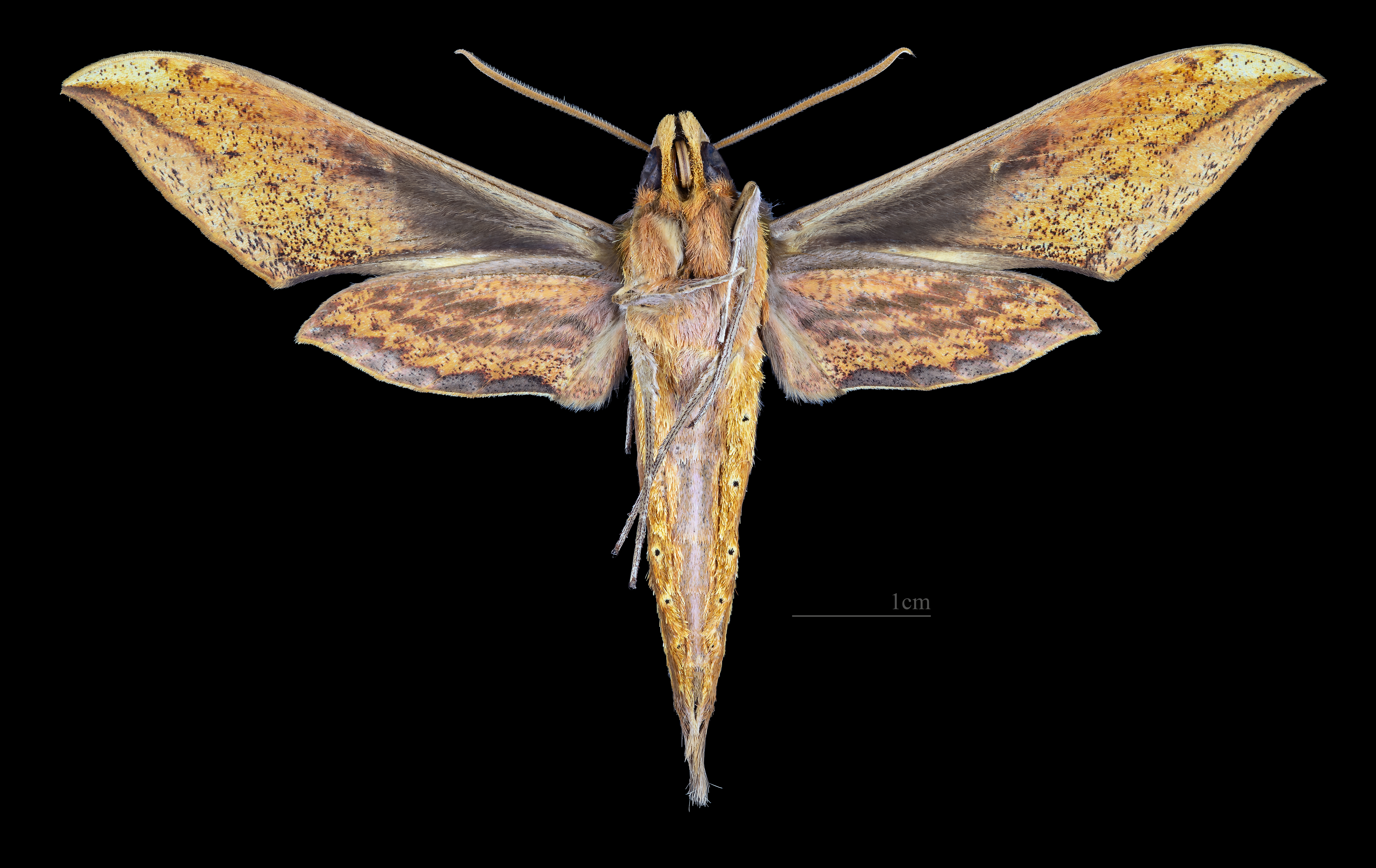
- Male ventral

Scientific classification
- Domain: Eukaryota
- Kingdom: Animalia
- Phylum: Arthropoda
- Class: Insecta
- Order: Lepidoptera
- Family: Sphingidae
- Genus: Xylophanes
- Species: X. schreiteri

Binomial name
- Xylophanes schreiteri Clark, 1923

= Xylophanes schreiteri =

Species of moth

Xylophanes schreiteri is a moth of the family Sphingidae. It is known from Argentina and Bolivia.

The wingspan is 71–92 mm. It is similar to Xylophanes resta, but both forewings and hindwings are apically more falcate and the outer margin of the forewing is straighter. Furthermore, distal to discal spot on the forewing upperside there is a dark brown dash running parallel and sometimes connected to the first postmedian line, which is stronger and reaches closer to the apex. The forewing underside has a pale yellow apical area on the costa, although this is occasionally pale buff and contrasting strongly with the orange-yellow ground colour.

Adults are on wing from February to March and again from October to November in Argentina.

The larvae probably feed on Rubiaceae and Malvaceae species.
