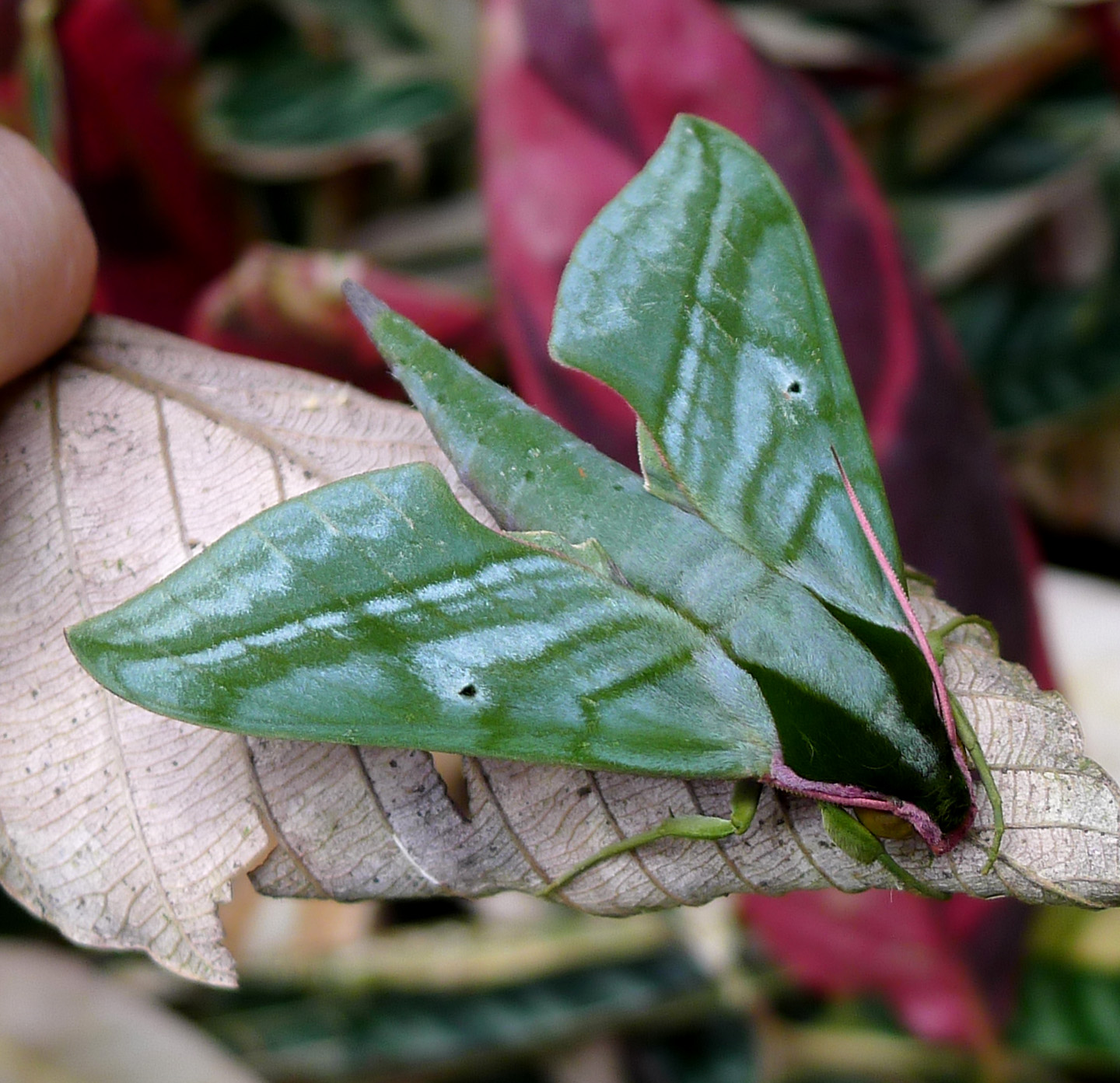

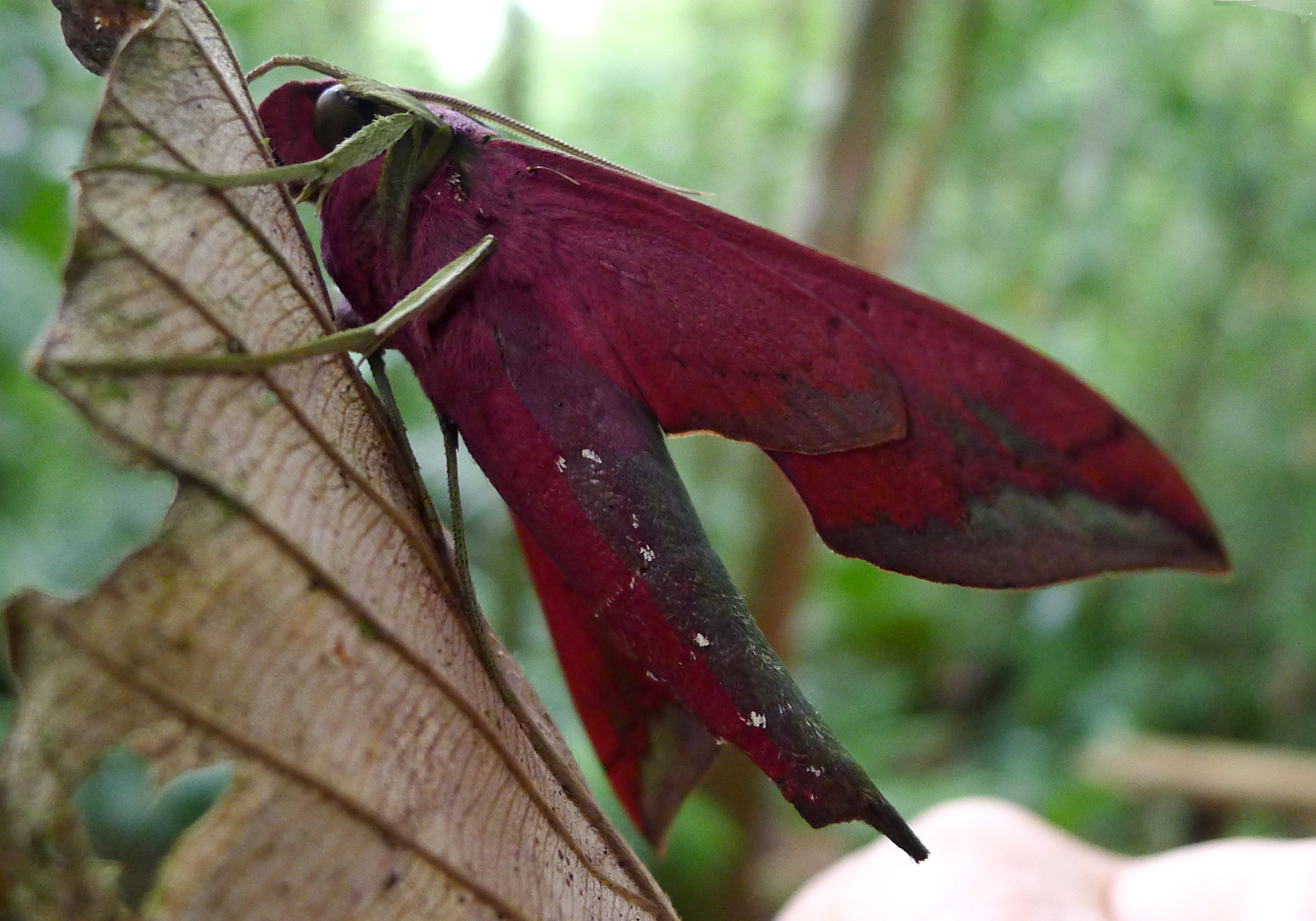

Scientific classification
- Domain: Eukaryota
- Kingdom: Animalia
- Phylum: Arthropoda
- Class: Insecta
- Order: Lepidoptera
- Family: Sphingidae
- Genus: Xylophanes
- Species: X. belti

Binomial name
- Xylophanes belti (H. Druce, 1878)

Synonyms
- Choerocampa belti H. Druce, 1878

= Xylophanes belti =

Species of moth

Xylophanes belti is a moth of the family Sphingidae first described by Herbert Druce in 1878.

== Distribution ==
It is known from Mexico, Nicaragua, Costa Rica, Belize, Honduras, Guatemala, and Panama.

== Description ==
The wingspan is 90–95 mm. The uppersides of the forewings, head, thorax and abdomen are deep olive green. There is a stripe running from the forewing base to the palp. The lateral patch on the abdomen and the undersides of the body and wings are deep carmine red. The forewing upperside is deep olive green, although the interspaces have a silky blue-grey gloss. There are three antemedian lines, of which the second and third are merged.

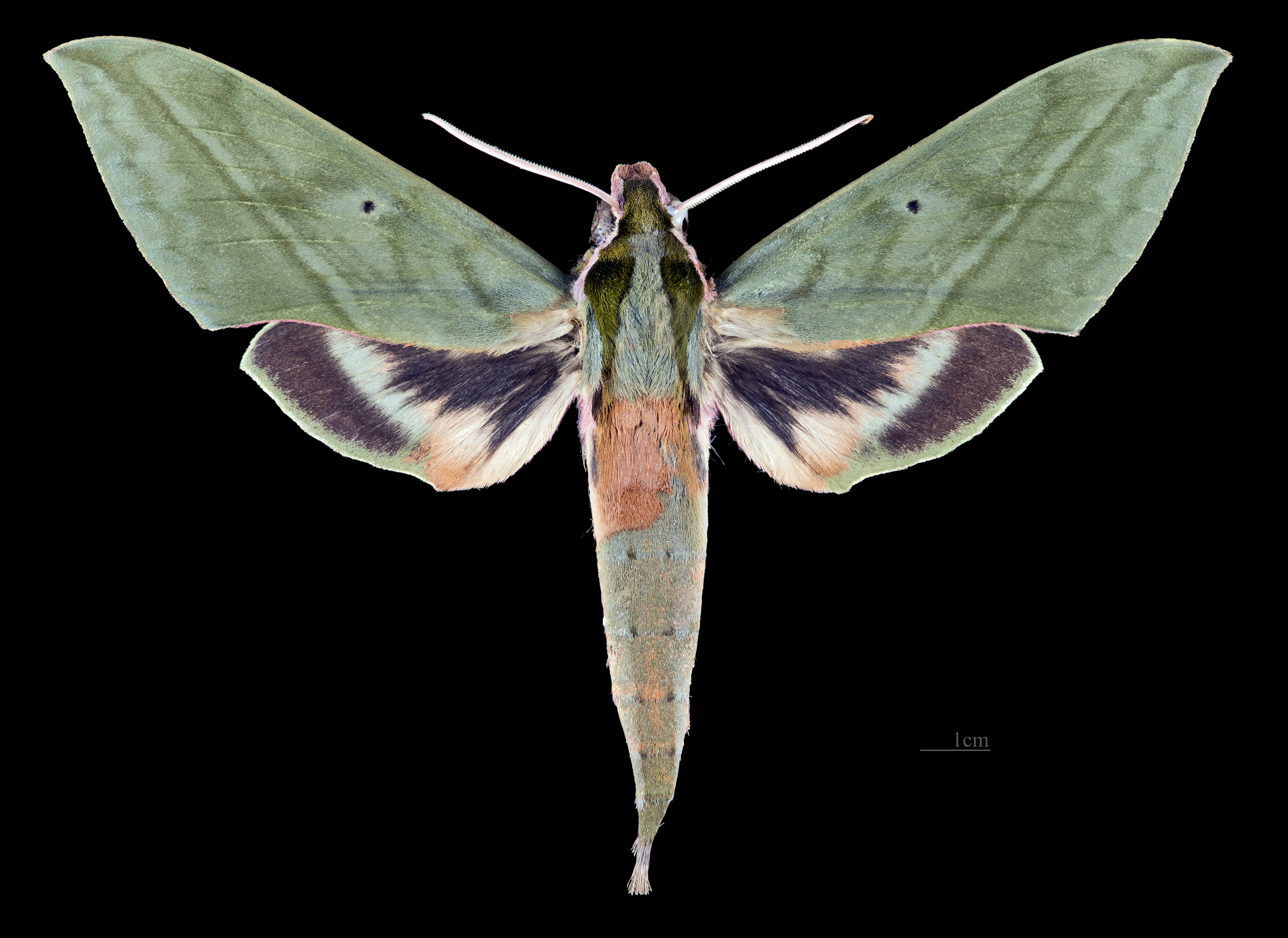
Male dorsal view

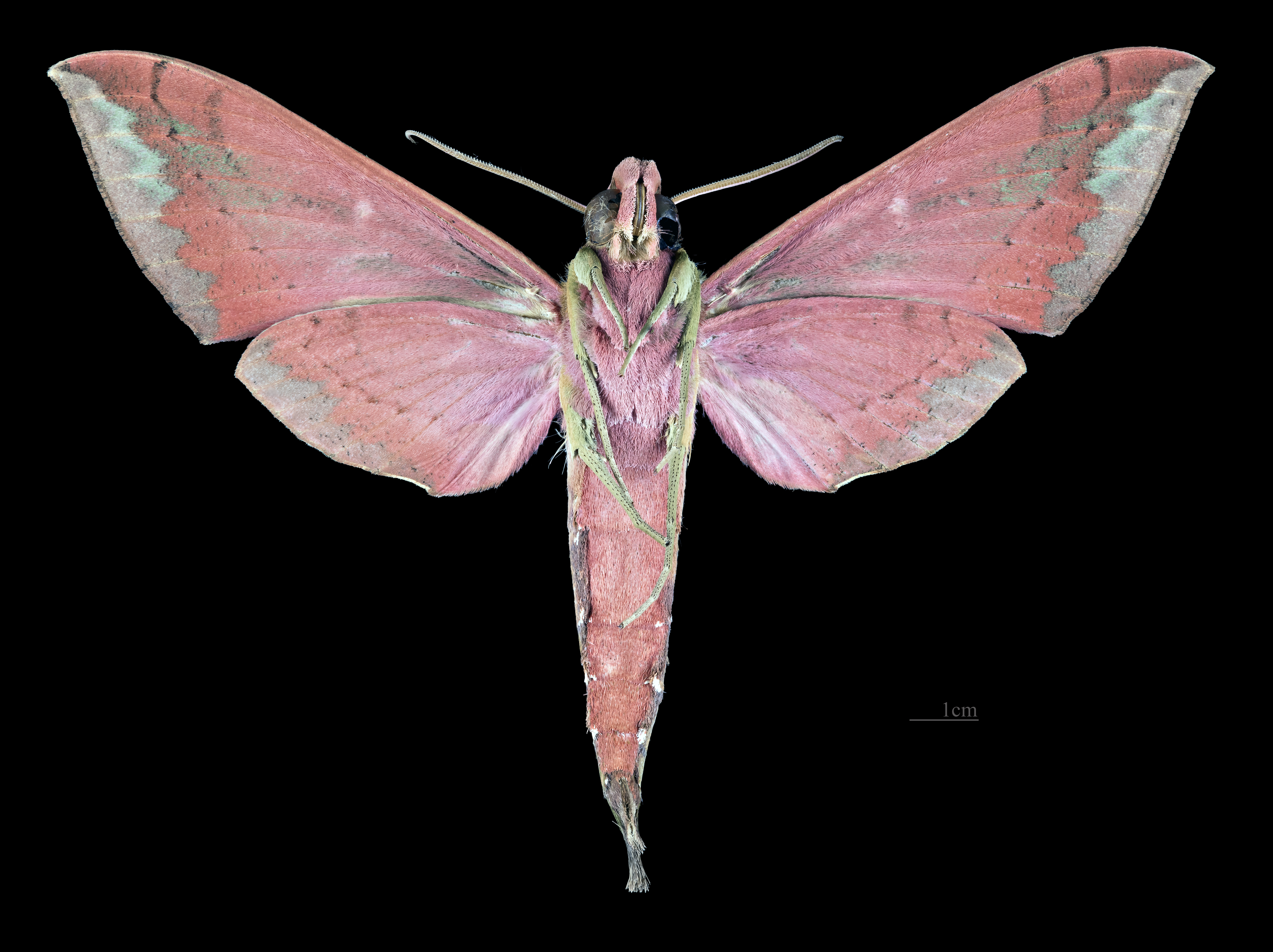
Male ventral view

== Biology ==
Adults are on wing year round in Costa Rica.

The larvae possibly feed on Psychotria panamensis, Psychotria nervosa and Pavonia guanacastensis.
