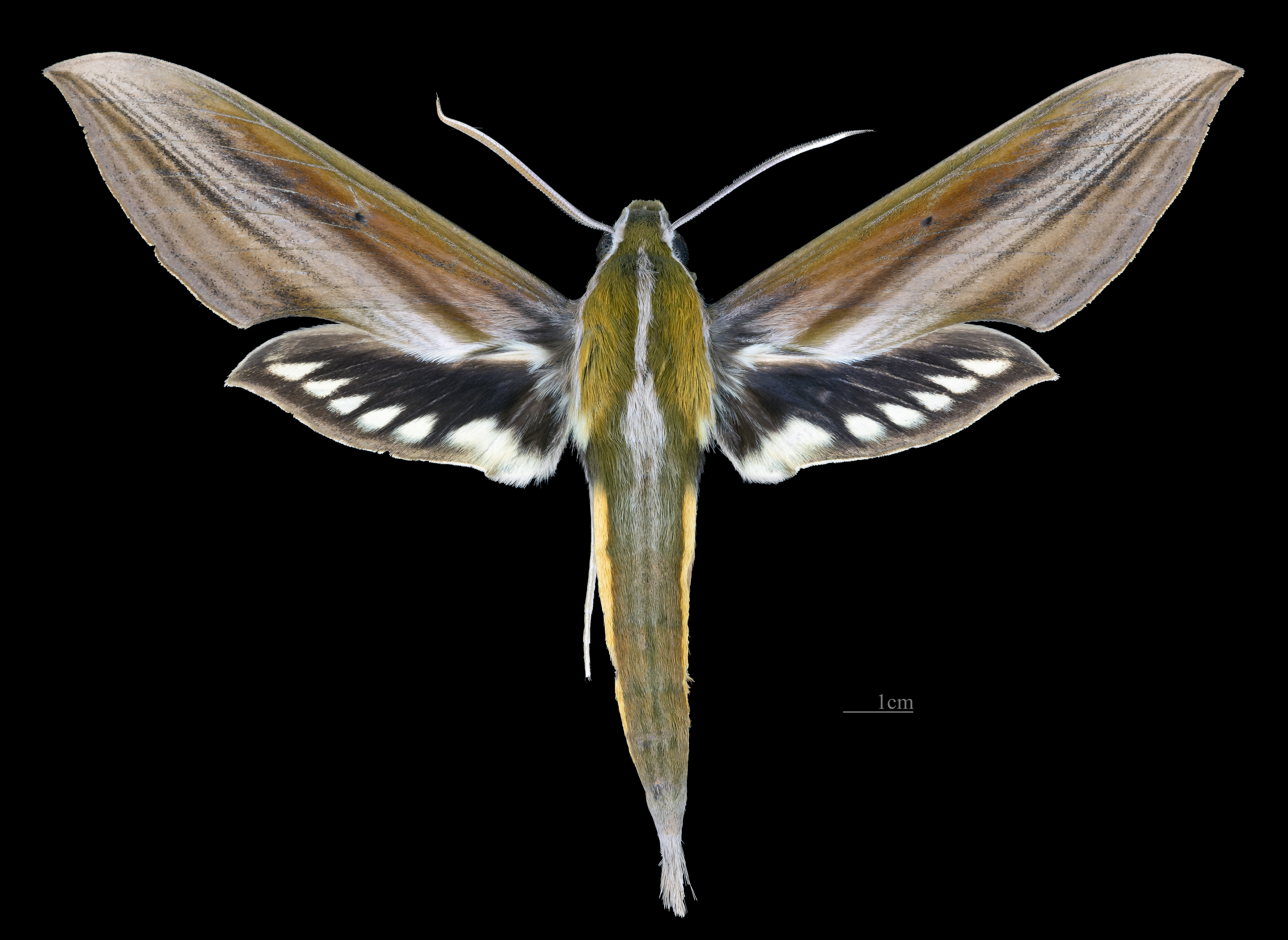
- Male dorsal
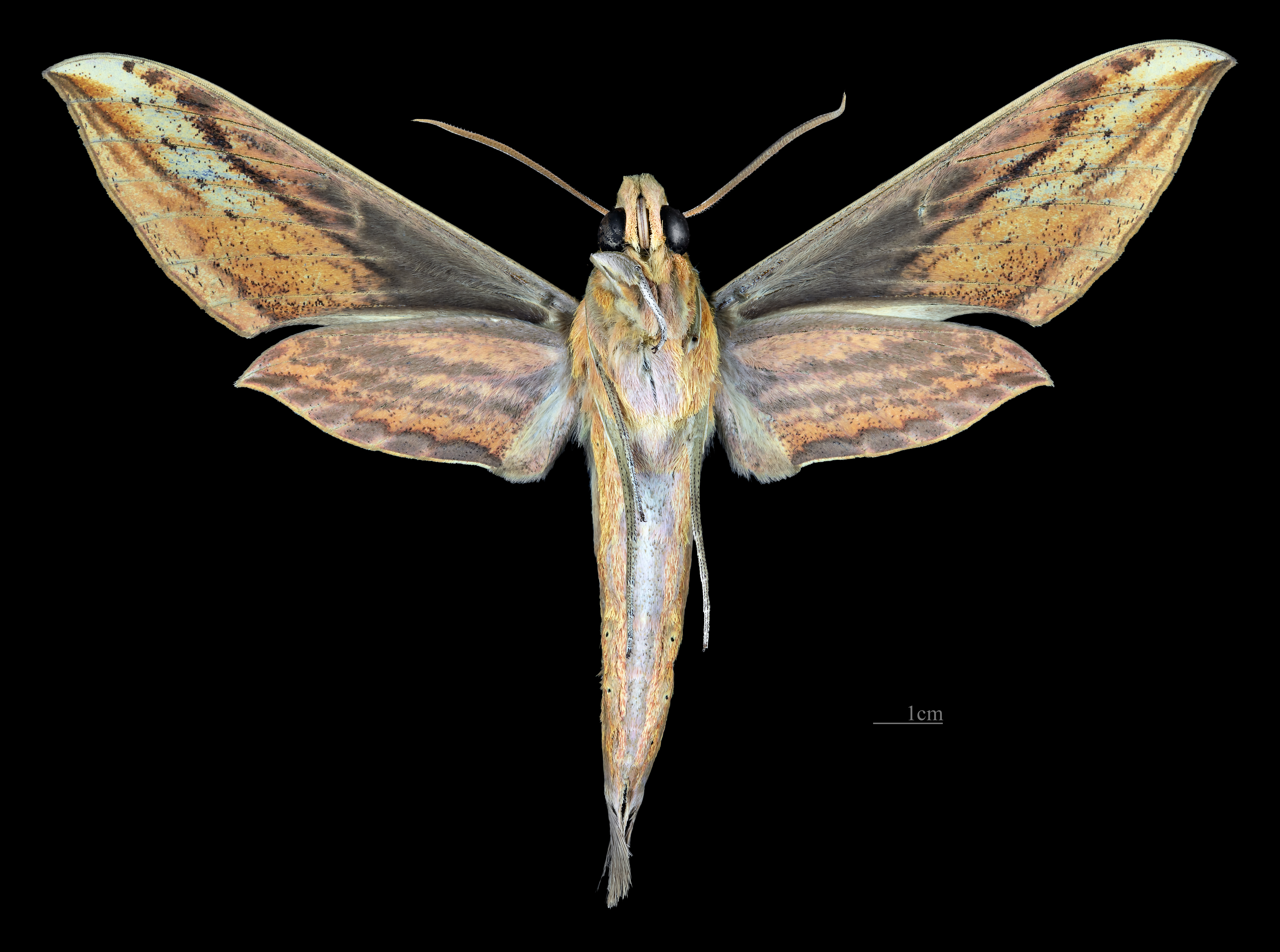
- Male ventral

Scientific classification
- Domain: Eukaryota
- Kingdom: Animalia
- Phylum: Arthropoda
- Class: Insecta
- Order: Lepidoptera
- Family: Sphingidae
- Genus: Xylophanes
- Species: X. resta

Binomial name
- Xylophanes resta Rothschild & Jordan, 1903

= Xylophanes resta =

Species of moth

Xylophanes resta is a moth of the family Sphingidae.

== Distribution ==
It is found from Venezuela south to Peru and Bolivia.

== Description ==
The length of the forewings is 36–41 mm. It is intermediate in appearance between Xylophanes aristor and Xylophanes tersa. There is a weakly developed golden medial line on the tegula. The upperside of the thorax has a grey medial band, bordered laterally and divided medially by brown lines. This band is continued along the abdomen but becomes faint after the first two abdominal segments. There are golden-yellow lateral stripes on the abdominal segments three to six and a patch of pale hairs and a black patch anterior to these. The forewing upperside has a characteristic brown tone. The first postmedian line is very strong basally but disappears towards the apex. The second postmedian line is fused basally with the first and the fourth postmedian line is less than half the width of the first. The forewing and hindwing underside are brighter than in Xylophanes tersa and the brown markings are consequently more prominent. There is a straight brown line, in some places indistinct, crossing the wing parallel to the distal margin. The marginal area is not, or only slightly, darker than the disc. There is a weakly defined yellow costal patch present apically. The median band on the hindwing upperside has pale yellow spots. The marginal area of the hindwing underside is divided by the veins, which are pale orange.

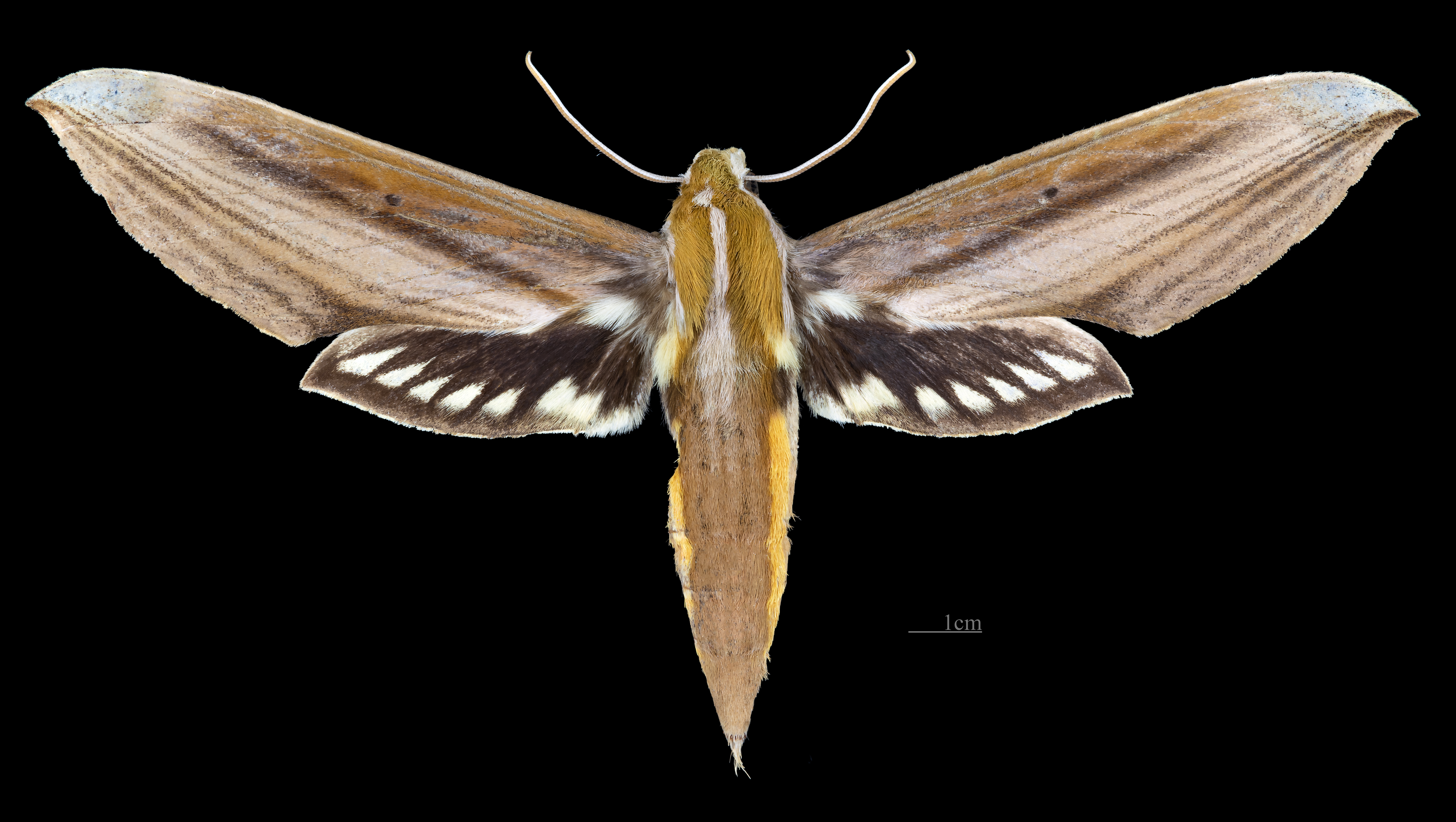
Female dorsal

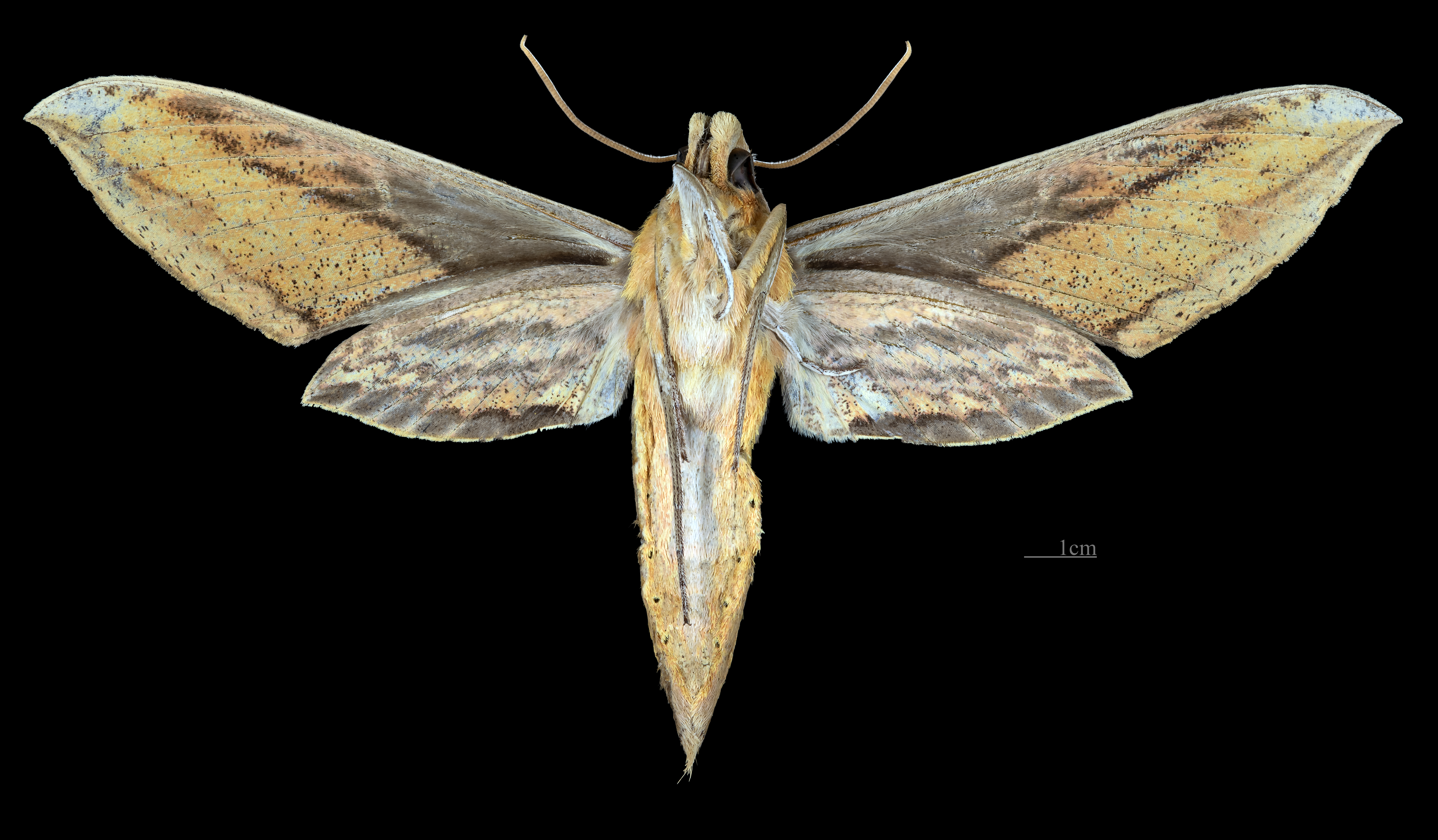
Female ventral

== Biology ==
Adults are probably on wing year-round.

The larvae probably feed on Rubiaceae and Malvaceae species.
