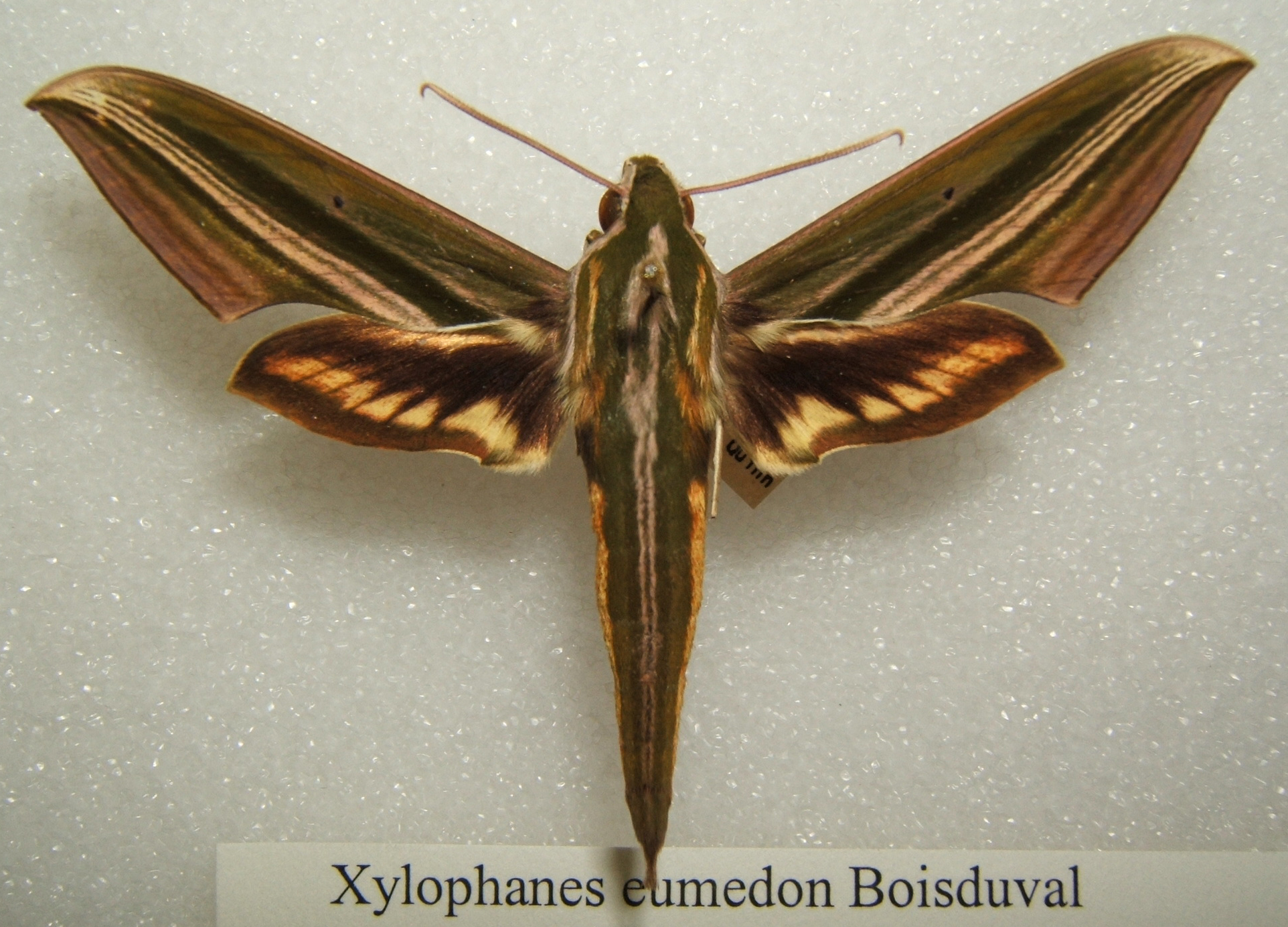
- Xylophanes eumedon, adult

Scientific classification
- Domain: Eukaryota
- Kingdom: Animalia
- Phylum: Arthropoda
- Class: Insecta
- Order: Lepidoptera
- Family: Sphingidae
- Genus: Xylophanes
- Species: X. eumedon

Binomial name
- Xylophanes eumedon (Boisduval, 1875)

Synonyms
- Choerocampa eumedon Boisduval, 1875; Choerocampa ortospana Druce, 1889

= Xylophanes eumedon =

Species of moth

Xylophanes eumedon is a moth of the family Sphingidae. It is known from Mexico.

It is similar to Xylophanes aristor but smaller and the forewing pattern is much more contrasted. It is distinguishable from most related species by the partial fusion and apical pinkish flush of the pale yellow spots of the median band of the hindwing upperside. The upperside of the abdomen has two narrow, pale lines, divided medially by a sharp, thin brown line of the same width. There is also a black basal patch and conspicuous longitudinal golden-yellow bands on either side of the anterior part of the abdomen. The first postmedian line on the forewing upperside is broad and very well-marked. The second is fused to the first. The interspaces between the first and third postmedian lines are very pale. The apical area on the forewing underside is pale buff on the costa, contrasting strongly with the orange-yellow ground colour. The median band of the hindwing upperside has pale yellow spots which are indistinct. The edges of these sports are suffused with orange-brown and in general, the three apical spots are more or less fused.

Adults are probably on wing year-round.

The larvae possibly feed on Psychotria panamensis, Psychotria nervosa and Pavonia guanacastensis.
