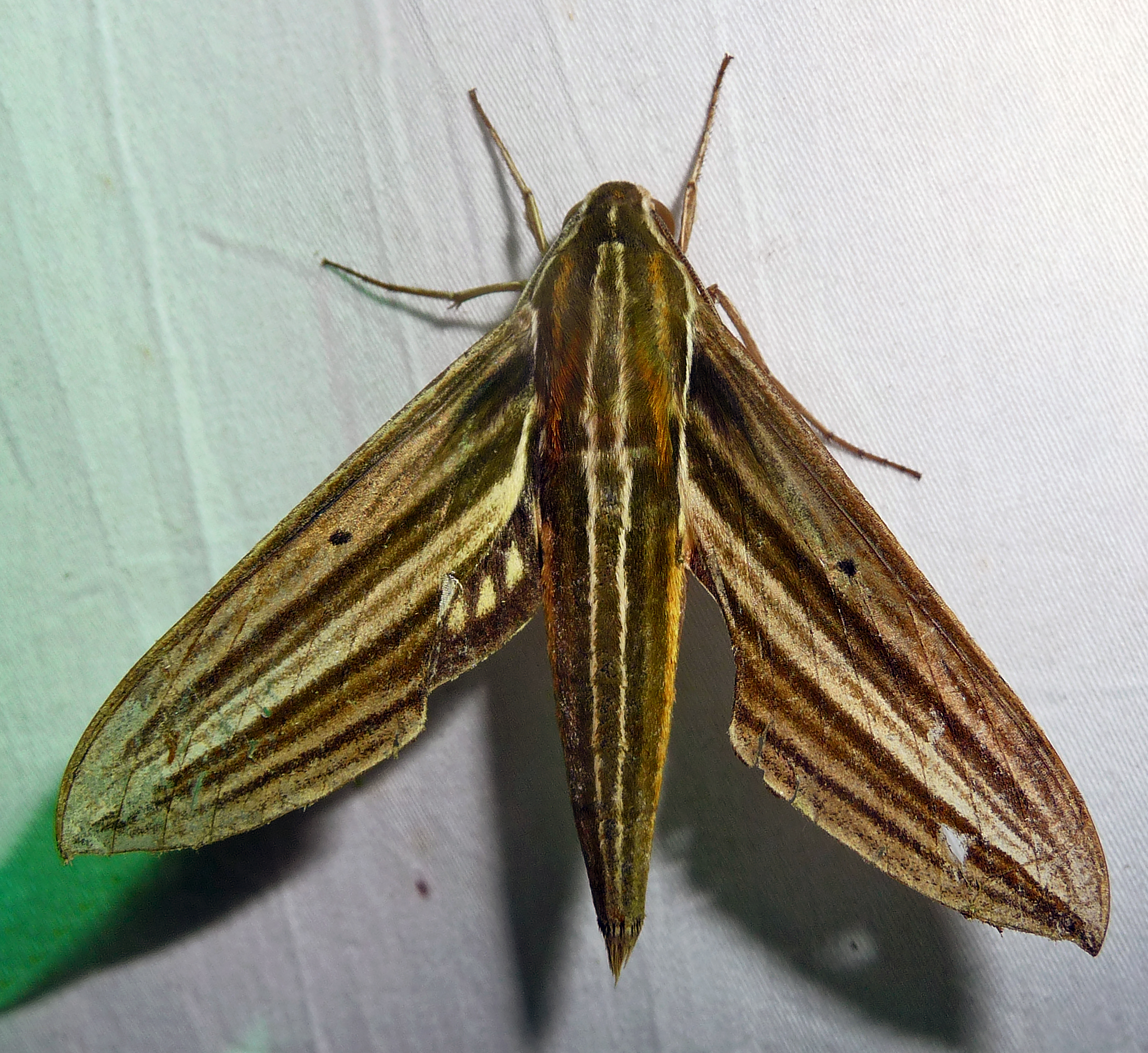
- Upperside

Scientific classification
- Domain: Eukaryota
- Kingdom: Animalia
- Phylum: Arthropoda
- Class: Insecta
- Order: Lepidoptera
- Family: Sphingidae
- Genus: Xylophanes
- Species: X. titana

Binomial name
- Xylophanes titana (H. Druce, 1878)

Synonyms
- Choerocampa titana H. Druce, 1878

= Xylophanes titana =

Species of moth

Xylophanes titana is a moth of the family Sphingidae first described by Herbert Druce in 1878.

== Distribution ==
It is known from Mexico, Belize, Guatemala, Honduras, Nicaragua, Costa Rica, Panama, Colombia, Ecuador, Peru, Bolivia, Paraguay, Argentina, Venezuela, French Guiana, Brazil and probably Guyana and Suriname.

== Description ==
The wingspan is 60–88 mm. It is similar to Xylophanes eumedon. The tegula has a golden medial line. The upperside of the abdomen has two narrow, pale lines, divided medially by a sharp, broad olive-green or brown line of much greater width. The two pale lines merge into a single median line on the prothorax. The forewing underside has an apical area on the costa of the same pale yellow colour as the area between the second and fourth postmedian lines. The median band of the hindwing upperside has distinct pale yellow spots and smaller apical spots often reduced in size and suffused with black.

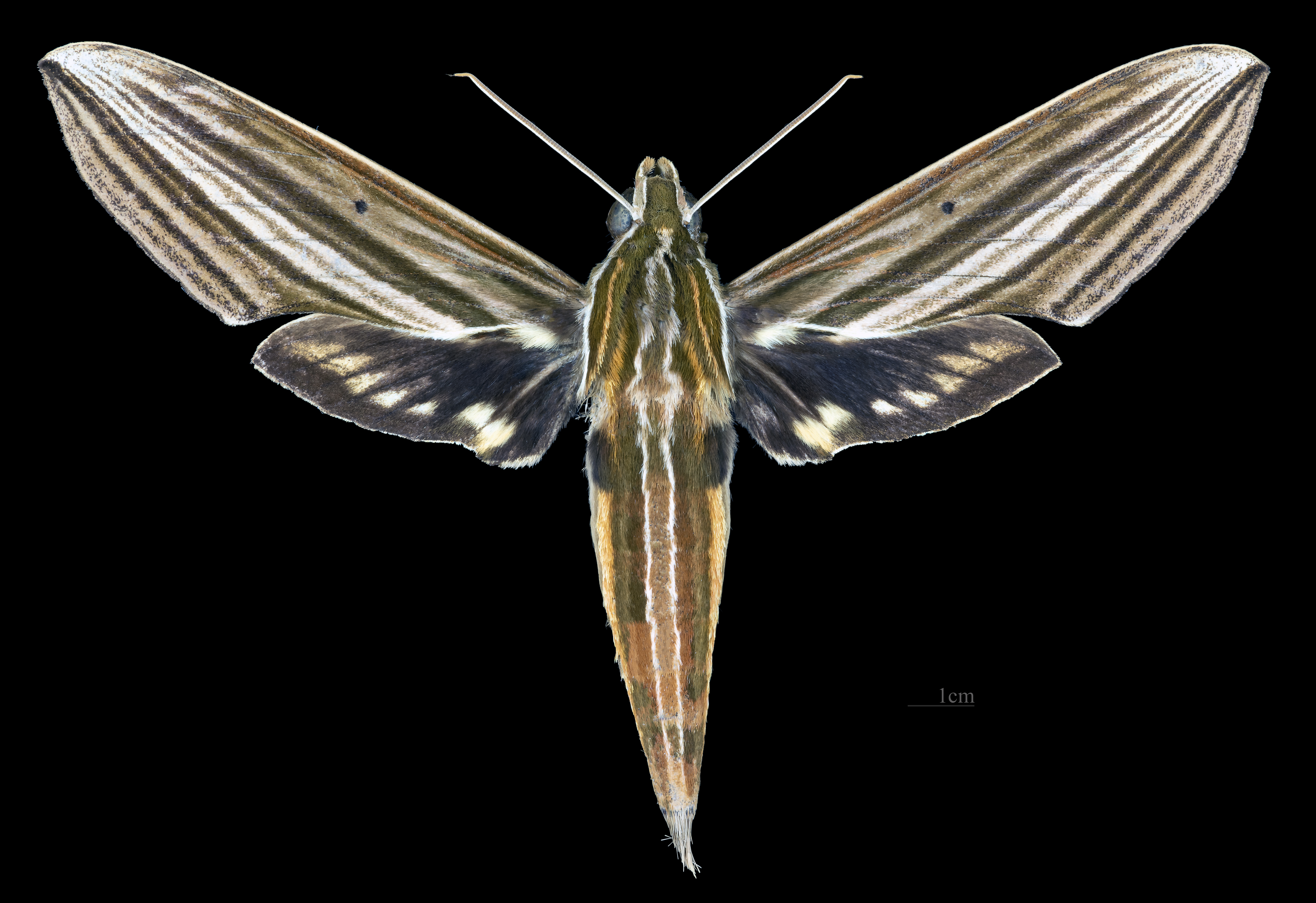
Female

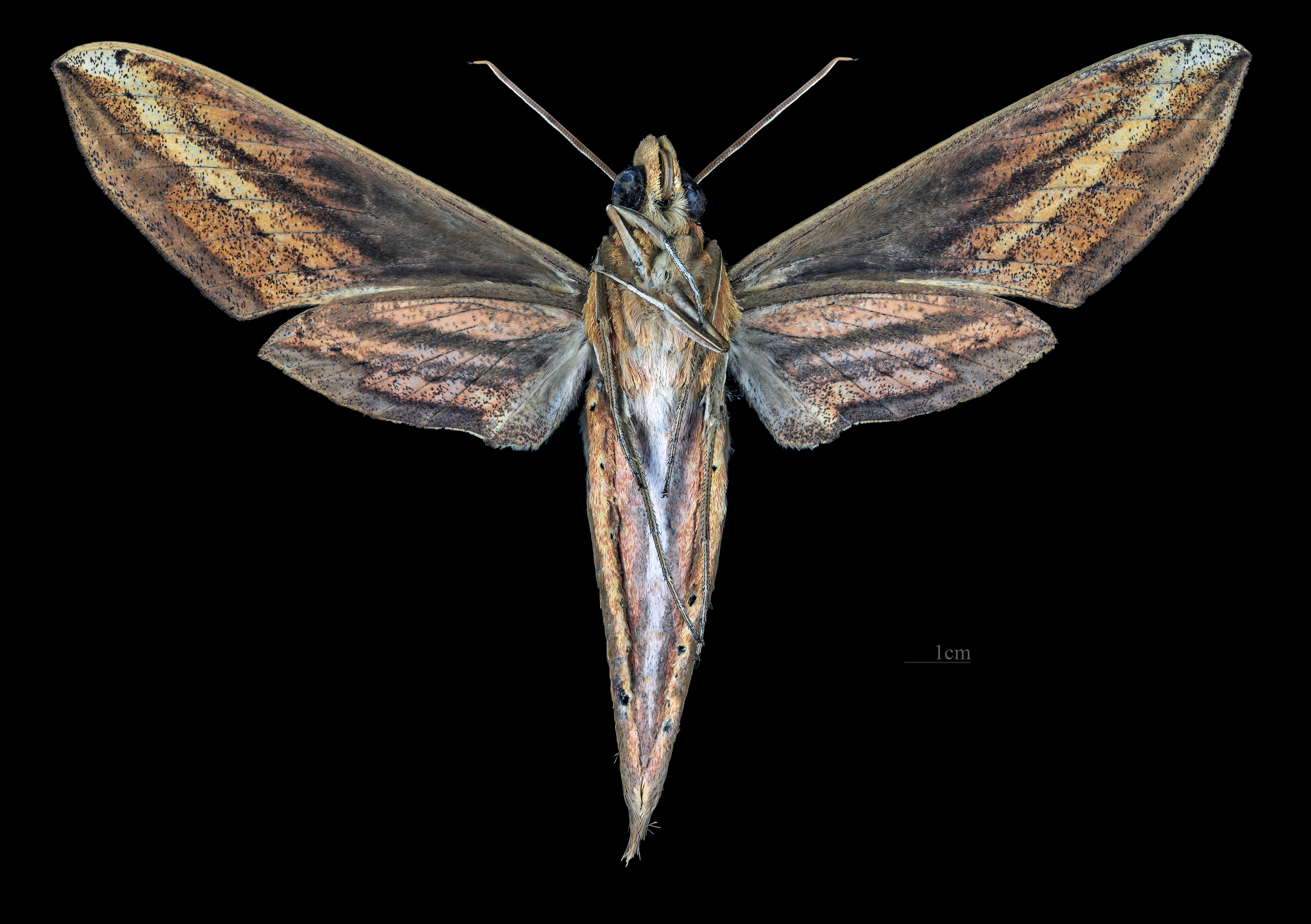
Female underside

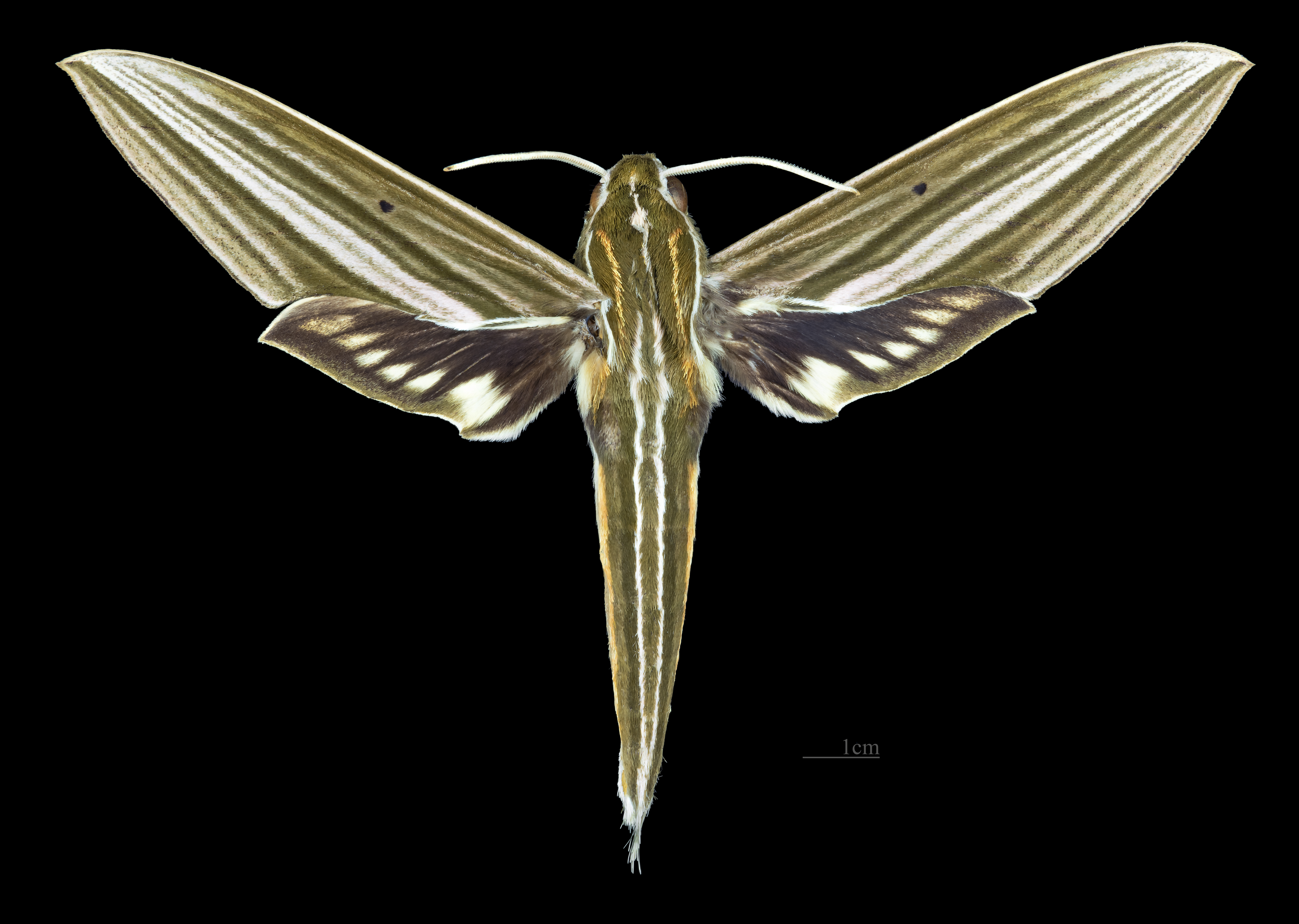
Male

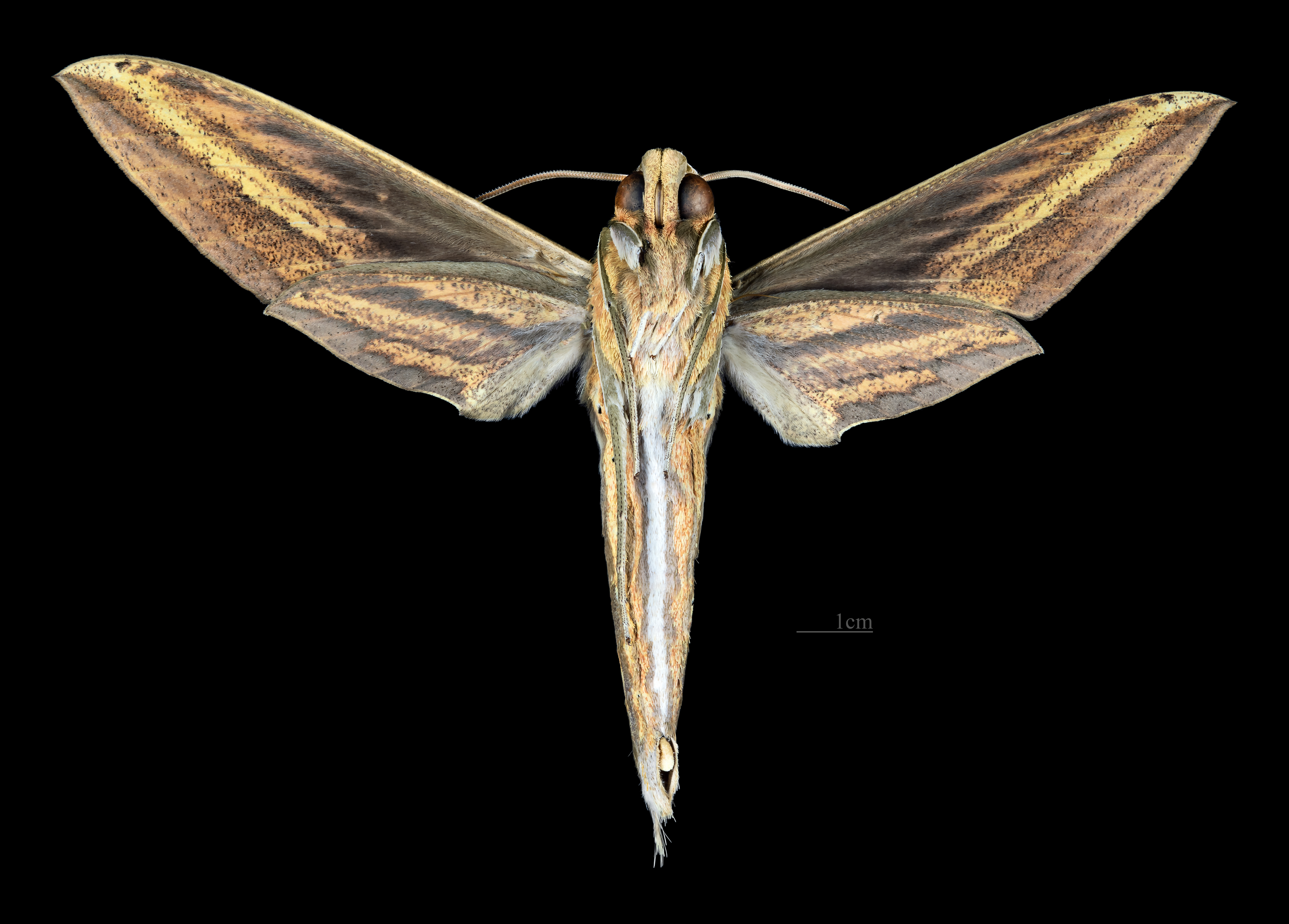
Male underside

== Biology ==
There are probably at least two generations per year. In Costa Rica, adults have been recorded in every month except March. In Brazil, adults have been recorded in December.

The larvae feed on Rubiaceae species and have been recorded on Manettia reclinata in Costa Rica.
