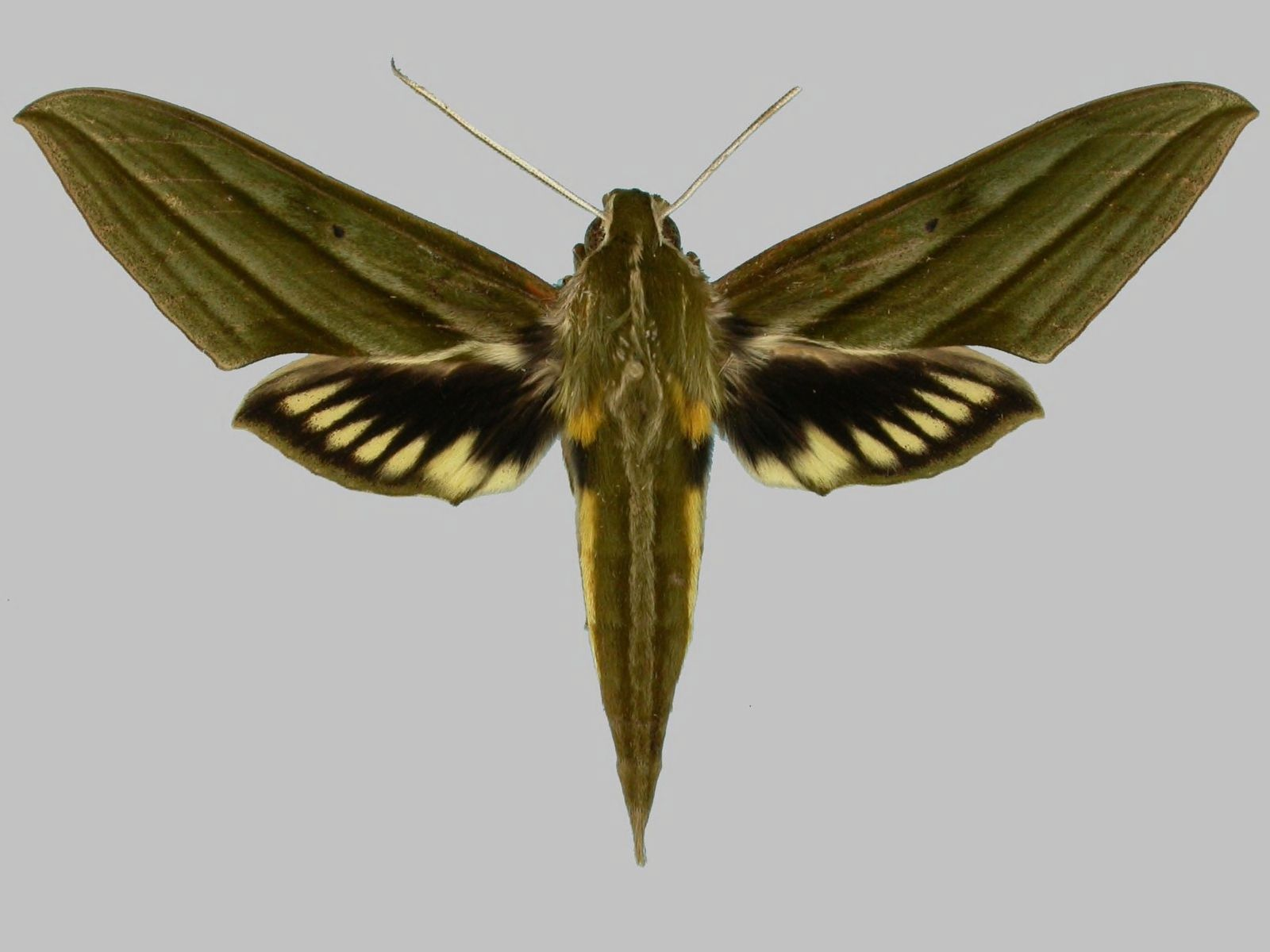

Scientific classification
- Domain: Eukaryota
- Kingdom: Animalia
- Phylum: Arthropoda
- Class: Insecta
- Order: Lepidoptera
- Family: Sphingidae
- Genus: Xylophanes
- Species: X. aristor

Binomial name
- Xylophanes aristor (Boisduval, 1870)

Synonyms
- Choerocampa aristor Boisduval, 1870; Chaerocampa hortulanus Schaufuss, 1870

= Xylophanes aristor =

Species of moth

Xylophanes aristor is a moth of the family Sphingidae. It is known from Guatemala to Venezuela, Ecuador and probably Colombia.

Adults are probably on wing year-round.

The larvae probably feed on Psychotria panamensis, Psychotria nervosa and Pavonia guanacastensis.
