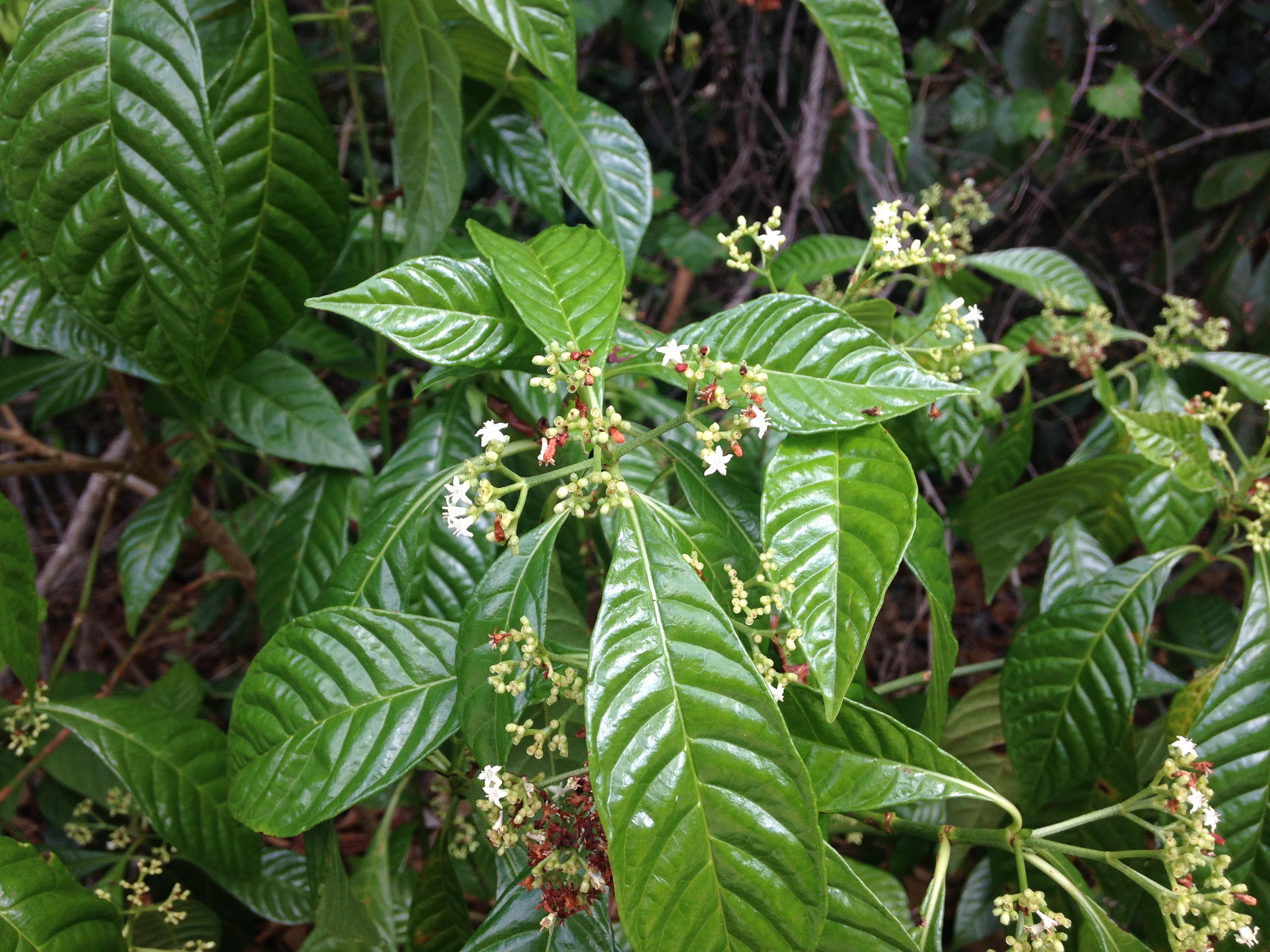

Conservation status
- Least Concern (IUCN 3.1)

- Secure (NatureServe)

Scientific classification
- Kingdom: Plantae
- Clade: Tracheophytes
- Clade: Angiosperms
- Clade: Eudicots
- Clade: Asterids
- Order: Gentianales
- Family: Rubiaceae
- Genus: Psychotria
- Species: P. nervosa

Binomial name
- Psychotria nervosa Sw.

= Psychotria nervosa =

Species of shrub

Psychotria nervosa, also known as Seminole balsamo or wild coffee, is a shade tolerant medium-sized shrub native to Florida as well as the West Indies and Central and South America. It produces a "small, red, ellipsoid fruit" that resembles "the true coffee bean" in shape and attract birds. Its maximum height ranges from approximately 4–10 feet.

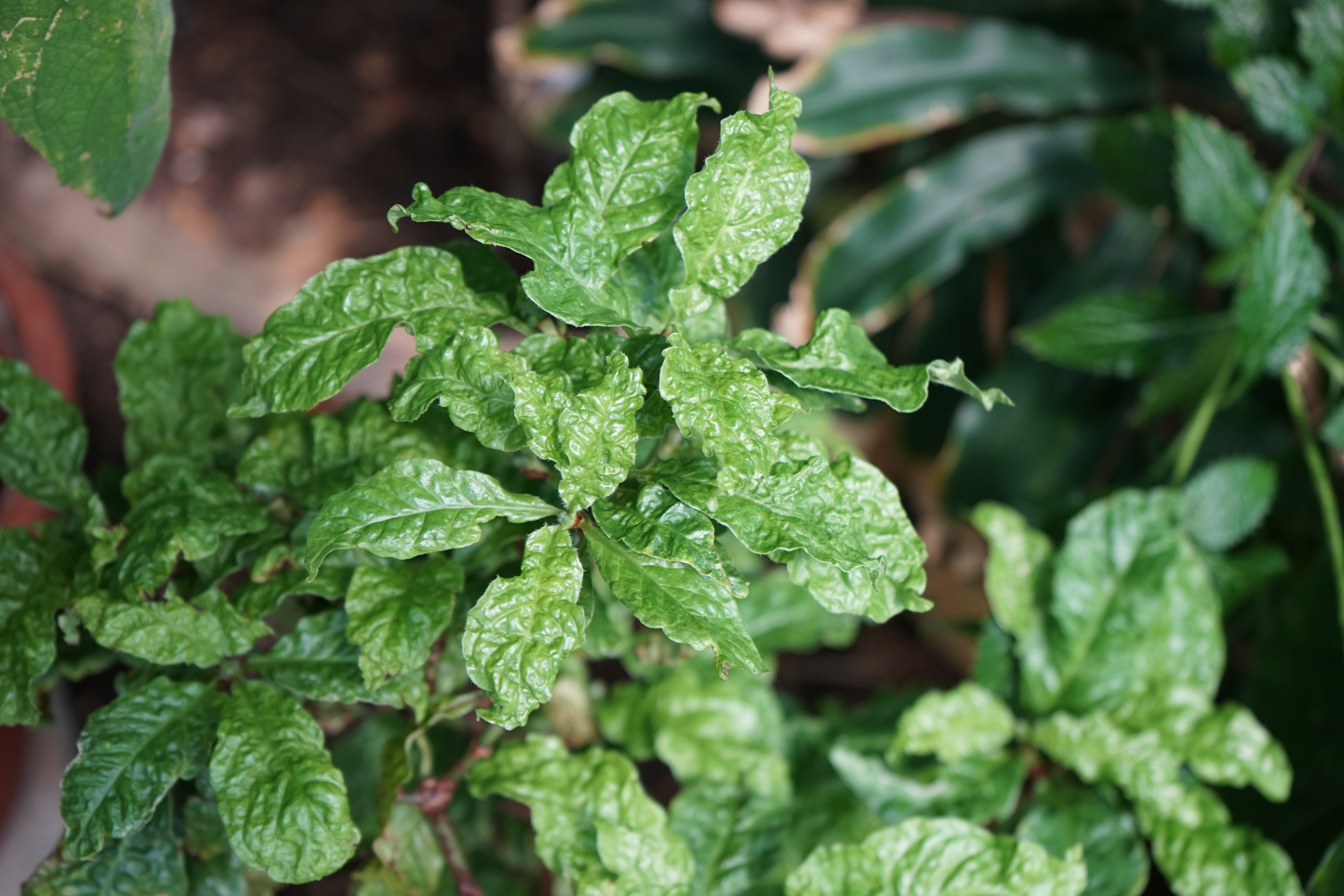
Psychotria nervosa leaves

Despite its common name of wild coffee, this species is not known to contain any caffeine. In recounting anecdotes from others, the Florida ethnobotanist, Dan Austin, reported that the use of the seeds as a coffee substitute resulted in "only bad taste and terrible headaches." A similar account reported no known usage as a coffee substitute in Jamaica and noted the morphological similarity of its seed to coffee, the more likely reason for its common name being wild coffee. Reports of DMT in this species are also unsubstantiated.
