= List of Psychotria species =

Psychotria is a large genus of flowering plants in the coffee family Rubiaceae, with a pan-tropical distribution. As of May 2025, Plants of the World Online accepted the following 1641 species of Psychotria:

== A ==
- Psychotria abdita Standl.
- Psychotria aborensis Dunn
- Psychotria abouabouensis (Schnell) Verdc.
- Psychotria abrahamii Razafim. & B.Bremer
- Psychotria accumulans O.Lachenaud
- Psychotria acreana K.Krause
- Psychotria acuminatissima Elmer
- Psychotria acunae Borhidi, M.Fernández & Oviedo
- Psychotria acutiflora DC.
- Psychotria acutigemma O.Lachenaud
- Psychotria adafoana K.Schum.
- Psychotria adamawae O.Lachenaud
- Psychotria adamsonii Fosberg
- Psychotria adenophylla Wall.
- Psychotria aegialodes (Bremek.) A.P.Davis & Govaerts
- Psychotria aemulans K.Schum.
- Psychotria agamae Merr.
- Psychotria aganosmifolia Craib
- Psychotria aguilarii Standl. & Steyerm.
- Psychotria alabatensis Sohmer & A.P.Davis
- Psychotria alainii Acuña & Roíg
- Psychotria alaotra Razafim. & B.Bremer
- Psychotria alaotrensis Bremek.
- Psychotria alatipes Wernham
- Psychotria alba Ruiz & Pav.
- Psychotria albicaulis Scott Elliot
- Psychotria albomarginata Hallier f.
- Psychotria alemquerensis Huber
- Psychotria alfaroana Standl.
- Psychotria alibertioides Wernham
- Psychotria alluviorum K.Krause
- Psychotria alpestris Urb. & Ekman
- Psychotria alsophila K.Schum.
- Psychotria alticola Steyerm.
- Psychotria altimontana O.Lachenaud
- Psychotria altiplanensis Standl. ex Steyerm.
- Psychotria alto-macahensis M.Gomes
- Psychotria alzapaniensis Sohmer & A.P.Davis
- Psychotria amaracarpoides (Merr.) Merr.
- Psychotria ambatovensis C.M.Taylor
- Psychotria ambohimitombensis Bremek.
- Psychotria ambongensis (Bremek.) A.P.Davis & Govaerts
- Psychotria amboniana K.Schum.
- Psychotria amieuensis Guillaumin
- Psychotria ammericola Guillaumin
- Psychotria ampla Müll.Arg.
- Psychotria amplifrons Standl.
- Psychotria amplissima Merr.
- Psychotria amplithyrsa Valeton
- Psychotria ampullacea A.C.Sm.
- Psychotria anamallayana Bedd.
- Psychotria anartiothrix Steyerm.
- Psychotria ancaranensis (Bremek.) A.P.Davis & Govaerts
- Psychotria anceps Kunth
- Psychotria andaiensis Valeton
- Psychotria andamanica Kurz
- Psychotria andapae A.P.Davis & Govaerts
- Psychotria andasibeensis Razafim. & B.Bremer
- Psychotria andersonii Fosberg
- Psychotria anderssoniana A.P.Davis & Govaerts
- Psychotria andetrensis (Bremek.) A.P.Davis & Govaerts
- Psychotria andevorantensis Bremek.
- Psychotria andramontaensis A.P.Davis & Govaerts
- Psychotria andriantiana A.P.Davis & Govaerts
- Psychotria anemothyrsa K.Schum. & K.Krause
- Psychotria angulata Korth.
- Psychotria angustata Andersson
- Psychotria angustibracteata (Verdc.) J.E.Burrows
- Psychotria anisocephala Müll.Arg.
- Psychotria anisophylla C.M.Taylor
- Psychotria anjanaharibensis A.P.Davis & Govaerts
- Psychotria anjouanensis A.P.Davis & Govaerts
- Psychotria ankafinensis (K.Schum.) A.P.Davis & Govaerts
- Psychotria ankarensis (Bremek.) Razafim. & B.Bremer
- Psychotria ankasensis J.B.Hall
- Psychotria anosiana C.M.Taylor
- Psychotria antakaranensis Razafim. & B.Bremer
- Psychotria antenniformis Steyerm.
- Psychotria anthocleistifolia O.Lachenaud
- Psychotria antilahimenae C.M.Taylor
- Psychotria antsalovensis (Bremek.) A.P.Davis & Govaerts
- Psychotria antsirananensis A.P.Davis & Govaerts
- Psychotria apdavisiana W.N.Takeuchi
- Psychotria apocynifolia A.Gray
- Psychotria apodantha A.Gray
- Psychotria apodocephala Standl.
- Psychotria apomurioides C.M.Taylor
- Psychotria appendiculata Müll.Arg.
- Psychotria aquatica O.Lachenaud
- Psychotria aquatilis Merr. & L.M.Perry
- Psychotria araiosantha A.C.Sm. & S.P.Darwin
- Psychotria ararum C.M.Taylor
- Psychotria arborea Hiern
- Psychotria arborescens Elmer
- Psychotria arbuscula Volkens
- Psychotria archboldii Sohmer
- Psychotria ardisioides Craib
- Psychotria arenosa Müll.Arg.
- Psychotria areolata C.M.Taylor
- Psychotria argantha A.C.Sm.
- Psychotria argentata Korth.
- Psychotria arirambana Standl.
- Psychotria aristeguietae Steyerm.
- Psychotria armandii Razafim. & B.Bremer
- Psychotria arnoldiana De Wild.
- Psychotria aroensis Steyerm.
- Psychotria artensis (Montrouz.) Guillaumin
- Psychotria articulata (Hiern) E.M.A.Petit
- Psychotria asae (Kuntze) ined.
- Psychotria asekiensis Sohmer
- Psychotria asiatica L.
- Psychotria assimilis Bremek.
- Psychotria asterogramma O.Lachenaud
- Psychotria atricaulis Fosberg
- Psychotria atroviridis Ridl.
- Psychotria atsinanana Razafim. & B.Bremer
- Psychotria augagneurii Hochr.
- Psychotria augustaflussiana W.N.Takeuchi
- Psychotria aurantiiflora O.Lachenaud
- Psychotria aurantiocarpa Fosberg
- Psychotria aurea Lauterb.
- Psychotria auriculata C.Wright ex Griseb.
- Psychotria auxopoda E.M.A.Petit
- Psychotria avenis Pancher ex Prain
- Psychotria avilensis Steyerm.
- Psychotria awa C.M.Taylor
- Psychotria axilliflora Merr. & L.M.Perry

== B ==
- Psychotria babatwoensis Cheek
- Psychotria bagshawei E.M.A.Petit
- Psychotria bahiensis DC.
- Psychotria baillonii Schltr.
- Psychotria bakeri Dwyer
- Psychotria bakossiensis Cheek & Sonké
- Psychotria baladensis (Baill.) Guillaumin
- Psychotria balakrishnii Deb & M.G.Gangop.
- Psychotria balancanensis C.W.Ham.
- Psychotria balansae Pit.
- Psychotria balbisiana DC.
- Psychotria baldwinii O.Lachenaud
- Psychotria balfouriana Verdc.
- Psychotria baltenweckii Urb.
- Psychotria bampsiana O.Lachenaud
- Psychotria banahaensis Elmer
- Psychotria banaona Urb.
- Psychotria bangladeshica M.Gangop. & Chakrab.
- Psychotria bangueyensis Merr.
- Psychotria bangweana K.Schum.
- Psychotria barbatiloba Merr. & L.M.Perry
- Psychotria barberi Gamble
- Psychotria barensis K.Krause
- Psychotria barkleyi Sohmer & A.P.Davis
- Psychotria baronii (Bremek.) A.P.Davis & Govaerts
- Psychotria basicordata O.Lachenaud
- Psychotria bataanensis Elmer
- Psychotria batangana K.Schum.
- Psychotria bathieana A.P.Davis & Govaerts
- Psychotria batopedina (Verdc.) Razafim. & B.Bremer
- Psychotria baviensis Pit.
- Psychotria bayombongensis Sohmer & A.P.Davis
- Psychotria bealananensis Razafim. & B.Bremer
- Psychotria beaufortiensis Valeton ex Sohmer
- Psychotria beddomei Deb & M.G.Gangop.
- Psychotria beentjei O.Lachenaud
- Psychotria belamboi Razafim. & B.Bremer
- Psychotria bemarahensis Razafim. & B.Bremer
- Psychotria bemarivensis A.P.Davis & Govaerts
- Psychotria berizokae (Bremek.) A.P.Davis & Govaerts
- Psychotria bermejalensis Britton
- Psychotria bernardii Steyerm.
- Psychotria bernieri (Bremek.) Razafim. & B.Bremer
- Psychotria berryi Wingf.
- Psychotria beskeana Schltdl.
- Psychotria betamponensis (Bremek.) A.P.Davis & Govaerts
- Psychotria betotozafyi Razafim. & B.Bremer
- Psychotria beyrichiana Müll.Arg.
- Psychotria bhargavae M.Gangop. & Chakrab.
- Psychotria bialata C.Wright ex Griseb.
- Psychotria biaristata Bartl. ex DC.
- Psychotria biaurita (Hutch. & Dalziel) Verdc.
- Psychotria bidentata (Thunb. ex Schult.) Hiern
- Psychotria bifaria Hiern
- Psychotria bilabiata O.Lachenaud
- Psychotria bilineata O.Lachenaud
- Psychotria biloba (Bremek.) Razafim. & B.Bremer
- Psychotria bimbiensis Bridson & Cheek
- Psychotria birchiana King & Gamble
- Psychotria birkinshawiana C.M.Taylor
- Psychotria birotula L.B.Sm. & Downs
- Psychotria bissei Borhidi & Oviedo
- Psychotria bisulcata Wight & Arn.
- Psychotria blepharocalyx O.Lachenaud
- Psychotria blydeniae O.Lachenaud & Jongkind
- Psychotria bodenii Wernham
- Psychotria boenyana (Bremek.) A.P.Davis & Govaerts
- Psychotria bogotensis Standl.
- Psychotria boholensis Merr. ex Sohmer & A.P.Davis
- Psychotria boiviniana (Baill.) Razafim. & B.Bremer
- Psychotria boivinii Bremek.
- Psychotria boloboensis Valeton
- Psychotria bonii Pit.
- Psychotria boninensis Nakai
- Psychotria bontocensis Merr.
- Psychotria boquetensis Dwyer
- Psychotria borbonica (J.F.Gmel.) Razafim. & B.Bremer
- Psychotria borjensis Kunth
- Psychotria bourailensis Guillaumin
- Psychotria brachyandra Müll.Arg.
- Psychotria brachyantha Hiern
- Psychotria brachyanthema Standl.
- Psychotria brachyanthoides De Wild.
- Psychotria brachyblastus A.P.Davis & Govaerts
- Psychotria brachyceras Müll.Arg.
- Psychotria brachygyne Müll.Arg.
- Psychotria brachylaena (Baill.) Guillaumin
- Psychotria brachypoda (Müll.Arg.) Britton
- Psychotria brachypus (K.Schum. & K.Krause) O.Lachenaud
- Psychotria brachythrix A.C.Sm.
- Psychotria brackenridgei A.Gray
- Psychotria bradei Standl.
- Psychotria brandneriana (L.Linden) Robbr.
- Psychotria brassii Hiern
- Psychotria breteleri O.Lachenaud
- Psychotria brevicalyx Fosberg
- Psychotria brevicaulis K.Schum.
- Psychotria brevifissa O.Lachenaud
- Psychotria breviflora (Schltdl.) Müll.Arg.
- Psychotria brevinodis Urb.
- Psychotria brevipaniculata De Wild.
- Psychotria brevipedunculata Müll.Arg.
- Psychotria brevipuberula E.M.A.Petit
- Psychotria brevistipula Urb.
- Psychotria bridsoniae A.P.Davis & Govaerts
- Psychotria brieyi De Wild.
- Psychotria bristolii Whistler
- Psychotria brittonii Oviedo & Borhidi
- Psychotria broweri Seem.
- Psychotria brucei Verdc.
- Psychotria brunnea Schweinf. ex Hiern
- Psychotria brunnescens Craib
- Psychotria bryonicola Proctor
- Psychotria buchii Urb.
- Psychotria bugoyensis K.Krause
- Psychotria bukaensis De Wild.
- Psychotria bulilimontis W.N.Takeuchi
- Psychotria bullata Seem.
- Psychotria bullulata Bremek.
- Psychotria buntingii Steyerm.
- Psychotria burkillii Deb & M.G.Gangop.
- Psychotria burmanica Deb & M.G.Gangop.
- Psychotria butibumensis Sohmer
- Psychotria byrsonimifolia Acuña & Roíg

== C ==
- Psychotria cabuyarensis Wernham
- Psychotria cadigensis Merr.
- Psychotria cagayanensis Merr.
- Psychotria cajambrensis Standl. ex Steyerm.
- Psychotria calceata E.M.A.Petit
- Psychotria calciphila Steyerm.
- Psychotria calderi Deb & M.G.Gangop.
- Psychotria callensii E.M.A.Petit
- Psychotria calliantha (Baill.) Guillaumin
- Psychotria calocardia Standl.
- Psychotria calocarpa Kurz
- Psychotria calophylla Standl.
- Psychotria calorhamnus (Baill.) Guillaumin ex Däniker
- Psychotria calothyris (Bremek.) A.P.Davis & Govaerts
- Psychotria calothyrsa (Baill.) Guillaumin
- Psychotria calva Hiern
- Psychotria calycosa A.Gray
- Psychotria calyptrata C.M.Taylor
- Psychotria cambodiana Pierre ex Pit.
- Psychotria camerunensis E.M.A.Petit
- Psychotria campoensis O.Lachenaud
- Psychotria camptodroma Merr. & L.M.Perry
- Psychotria camptopus Verdc.
- Psychotria canalensis (Baill.) Guillaumin
- Psychotria canarensis Talbot
- Psychotria capensis (Eckl.) Vatke
- Psychotria capillacea (Müll.Arg.) Standl.
- Psychotria capitulifera Merr. & L.M.Perry
- Psychotria capizensis Merr.
- Psychotria capuronii A.P.Davis & Govaerts
- Psychotria cardenasii Standl.
- Psychotria cardiochlamys (Baill.) Schltr.
- Psychotria cardiophylla Merr.
- Psychotria carronis C.Moore & F.Muell.
- Psychotria carstensensis Wernham
- Psychotria carthagenensis Jacq.
- Psychotria cascajalensis C.W.Ham.
- Psychotria casiguraensis Sohmer & A.P.Davis
- Psychotria castaneifolia E.M.A.Petit
- Psychotria castaneopila Merr.
- Psychotria castellana Müll.Arg.
- Psychotria castroi Merr. & Quisumb. ex Sohmer & A.P.Davis
- Psychotria catanduaniensis Sohmer & A.P.Davis
- Psychotria catetensis (Hiern) E.M.A.Petit
- Psychotria cathetoneura Urb.
- Psychotria caudata M.Gomes
- Psychotria celebica Miq.
- Psychotria cephalidantha K.Schum.
- Psychotria cephaloides A.P.Davis & Govaerts
- Psychotria cephalophora Merr.
- Psychotria ceratalabastron K.Schum.
- Psychotria ceratoloba (K.Schum.) O.Lachenaud
- Psychotria ceronii C.M.Taylor
- Psychotria cerrocoloradensis Dwyer ex C.M.Taylor
- Psychotria chagrensis Standl.
- Psychotria chalconeura (K.Schum.) E.M.A.Petit
- Psychotria chamelaensis C.M.Taylor & Dominguez-Lic.
- Psychotria champluvierae O.Lachenaud
- Psychotria charlotteana Razafim. & B.Bremer
- Psychotria chartacea Craib
- Psychotria chasaliifolia Pit.
- Psychotria chaunantha K.Schum. & Lauterb.
- Psychotria cheathamiana Fosberg
- Psychotria cheekii O.Lachenaud
- Psychotria chimboracensis Standl.
- Psychotria chiriquina Standl.
- Psychotria chitariana Dwyer & C.W.Ham.
- Psychotria chlorophylla Müll.Arg.
- Psychotria chonantha (Gilli) Sohmer
- Psychotria christarusselliae Sohmer & A.P.Davis
- Psychotria christii Urb.
- Psychotria christophersenii Whistler
- Psychotria chrysantha Merr. & L.M.Perry
- Psychotria chrysanthoides Sohmer
- Psychotria chrysocarpa Merr. & L.M.Perry
- Psychotria ciliolata Schltdl.
- Psychotria cinerea De Wild.
- Psychotria clarendonensis Urb.
- Psychotria clausa (Hiern) O.Lachenaud
- Psychotria clavipes Müll.Arg.
- Psychotria clivorum Standl. & Steyerm.
- Psychotria closterocarpa A.Gray
- Psychotria clusioides Proctor
- Psychotria cochabambana C.M.Taylor
- Psychotria cocosensis C.W.Ham.
- Psychotria coelocalyx Urb.
- Psychotria coeloneura Urb.
- Psychotria coelospermum F.M.Bailey
- Psychotria comorensis Bremek.
- Psychotria comperei E.M.A.Petit
- Psychotria comptonii S.Moore
- Psychotria concolor Benth. & Oerst.
- Psychotria condensa King & Gamble
- Psychotria condensata Valeton
- Psychotria condorensis Pierre ex Pit.
- Psychotria confertiloba A.C.Sm.
- Psychotria congesta Spreng. ex DC.
- Psychotria conglobata Valeton
- Psychotria conglobatioides Sohmer
- Psychotria conglomeratiflora Sohmer & A.P.Davis
- Psychotria conica O.Lachenaud
- Psychotria conjugens Müll.Arg.
- Psychotria connata Wall.
- Psychotria conocarpa Bremek.
- Psychotria consanguinea Müll.Arg.
- Psychotria convergens C.M.Taylor
- Psychotria cookei J.W.Moore
- Psychotria copeensis De Wild.
- Psychotria coptosperma (Baill.) Guillaumin
- Psychotria cordata A.Gray
- Psychotria cordatula Merr.
- Psychotria cornejoi C.M.Taylor
- Psychotria cornifer Wernham
- Psychotria cornuta Hiern
- Psychotria corrugata S.Venter
- Psychotria costata (Rusby) Standl.
- Psychotria costatovenosa Schltdl.
- Psychotria costivenia Griseb.
- Psychotria coursii Bremek.
- Psychotria crassicalyx K.Krause
- Psychotria crassiflora Fosberg
- Psychotria crassifolia Miq.
- Psychotria crassipedunculata Sohmer
- Psychotria crassipetala E.M.A.Petit
- Psychotria crassiramula Sohmer
- Psychotria crebrinervia Valeton
- Psychotria crispipila Merr.
- Psychotria crispulifolia (Bremek.) Razafim. & B.Bremer
- Psychotria cristalensis Urb.
- Psychotria croftiana Sohmer
- Psychotria cromophila Oviedo & Borhidi
- Psychotria cryptogrammata E.M.A.Petit
- Psychotria crystallina O.Lachenaud
- Psychotria cuernosensis Elmer
- Psychotria cumanensis Humb. & Bonpl. ex Schult.
- Psychotria cuneata Elmer
- Psychotria cuneifolia DC.
- Psychotria cuprea Ridl.
- Psychotria cupularis (Müll.Arg.) Standl.
- Psychotria cupulata Valeton
- Psychotria cuspidella Miq.
- Psychotria cussetii O.Lachenaud
- Psychotria cutucuana C.M.Taylor
- Psychotria cyanopharynx K.Schum.
- Psychotria cyathicalyx E.M.A.Petit
- Psychotria cyclophylla Urb.
- Psychotria cylindrostipula Merr.

== D ==
- Psychotria dallachiana Benth.
- Psychotria dalzellii Hook.f.
- Psychotria daphnoides A.Cunn. ex Hook.
- Psychotria darwiniana Cheek
- Psychotria dasyophthalma Griseb.
- Psychotria davidsmithiana C.M.Taylor
- Psychotria davisiana C.M.Taylor
- Psychotria decaryi Bremek.
- Psychotria declieuxioides S.Moore
- Psychotria decolor Drake ex Bremek.
- Psychotria decorifolia S.Moore
- Psychotria decumbens (Bremek.) A.P.Davis & Govaerts
- Psychotria deflexiflora C.M.Taylor
- Psychotria defretesiana (W.N.Takeuchi) W.N.Takeuchi
- Psychotria degreefii O.Lachenaud
- Psychotria deltata I.M.Turner
- Psychotria densa W.C.Chen
- Psychotria densicostata Müll.Arg.
- Psychotria densifolia Stapf
- Psychotria densinervia (K.Krause) Verdc.
- Psychotria densivenosa Müll.Arg.
- Psychotria denticulata Wall.
- Psychotria dermatophylla (K.Schum.) E.M.A.Petit
- Psychotria descoingsii O.Lachenaud
- Psychotria desirei Razafim. & B.Bremer
- Psychotria desseinii O.Lachenaud
- Psychotria deverdiana Guillaumin
- Psychotria dewildei O.Lachenaud
- Psychotria diegoae Borhidi
- Psychotria dieniensis Merr. & L.M.Perry
- Psychotria diffusa Merr.
- Psychotria diffusiflora A.C.Sm.
- Psychotria diminuta C.M.Taylor
- Psychotria dimorphophylla K.Schum.
- Psychotria dingalanensis Sohmer & A.P.Davis
- Psychotria diospyrifolia Kaneh.
- Psychotria diplococca Lauterb. & K.Schum.
- Psychotria diploneura (K.Schum.) Bridson & Verdc.
- Psychotria dipteropoda K.Schum. & Lauterb.
- Psychotria dipteropodioides Sohmer
- Psychotria direpta Wernham
- Psychotria distichodoma (Bremek.) A.P.Davis & Govaerts
- Psychotria distinctinervia A.P.Davis & Govaerts
- Psychotria divergens Blume
- Psychotria diversinodula (Verdc.) Verdc.
- Psychotria djumaensis De Wild.
- Psychotria dodoensis K.Krause
- Psychotria dolichocalyx Urb. & Ekman
- Psychotria dolichosepala Merr. & L.M.Perry
- Psychotria dolphiniana Urb.
- Psychotria dorotheae Wernham
- Psychotria dressleri (Dwyer) C.W.Ham.
- Psychotria droissartii O.Lachenaud
- Psychotria dubia (Wight) Alston
- Psychotria duckei Standl.
- Psychotria duncanthomasii O.Lachenaud
- Psychotria dura Griseb.
- Psychotria durilancifolia Dwyer
- Psychotria dwyeri C.W.Ham.

== E ==
- Psychotria ealaensis De Wild.
- Psychotria earlei Urb.
- Psychotria ebensis K.Schum.
- Psychotria ebracteata Urb.
- Psychotria ectasiphylla K.Schum. & Lauterb.
- Psychotria edaphothrix Steyerm.
- Psychotria edentata A.C.Sm.
- Psychotria educta Standl.
- Psychotria elachistantha (K.Schum.) E.M.A.Petit
- Psychotria eladii O.Lachenaud
- Psychotria elegans Ridl.
- Psychotria elephantina Lachenaud & Cheek
- Psychotria elliotii Bremek.
- Psychotria ellipsoidea Craib
- Psychotria elliptifolia Elmer
- Psychotria elliptilimba Merr.
- Psychotria elmeri Merr.
- Psychotria elmeriana Hochr.
- Psychotria eminiana (Kuntze) E.M.A.Petit
- Psychotria enanilihensis Bremek.
- Psychotria enneantha I.M.Turner
- Psychotria ermitensis Borhidi & Oviedo
- Psychotria erratica Hook.f.
- Psychotria erythrocarpa Schltdl.
- Psychotria erythropus K.Schum.
- Psychotria esmeraldana C.M.Taylor
- Psychotria euaensis M.Hotta
- Psychotria eumachioides C.M.Taylor
- Psychotria eumorphanthus Fosberg
- Psychotria euneura Miq.
- Psychotria euosma I.M.Turner
- Psychotria evenia C.Wright ex Griseb.
- Psychotria evrardiana E.M.A.Petit
- Psychotria exannulata Müll.Arg.
- Psychotria exellii R.Alves, Figueiredo & A.P.Davis
- Psychotria exigua (F.M.Bailey) Domin
- Psychotria exilis A.C.Sm.
- Psychotria expansissima K.Schum.
- Psychotria exsculpta S.Moore

== F ==
- Psychotria faguetii (Baill.) Schltr.
- Psychotria fambartiae Barrabé
- Psychotria faramalala Razafim. & B.Bremer
- Psychotria faucicola K.Schum.
- Psychotria fauriei (H.Lév.) Fosberg
- Psychotria febrifuga Poepp.
- Psychotria felsspitziensis Valeton
- Psychotria fendleri Standl.
- Psychotria fenicis Merr.
- Psychotria ferdinandi-muelleri Guillaumin
- Psychotria fernandopoensis E.M.A.Petit
- Psychotria ficigemma DC.
- Psychotria filipes A.Gray
- Psychotria fimbriatifolia R.D.Good
- Psychotria fimbricalyx (Miq.) Boerl.
- Psychotria fissicorne (Bremek.) Razafim. & B.Bremer
- Psychotria fitzalanii Benth.
- Psychotria flagelliflora O.Lachenaud
- Psychotria flava Oerst. ex Standl.
- Psychotria flavens Standl.
- Psychotria flavida Talbot
- Psychotria flaviramula Sohmer
- Psychotria fleuryi Pit.
- Psychotria florencei Lorence & W.L.Wagner
- Psychotria fluminensis Vell.
- Psychotria fluviatilis Chun ex W.C.Chen
- Psychotria foetens Sw.
- Psychotria foetida Griseb.
- Psychotria foliosa Hiern
- Psychotria foremanii Sohmer
- Psychotria formosa Cham. & Schltdl.
- Psychotria fortuita Standl.
- Psychotria fosteri C.W.Ham.
- Psychotria foxworthyi Sohmer & A.P.Davis
- Psychotria fractinervata E.M.A.Petit
- Psychotria fractistipula L.B.Sm., R.M.Klein & Delprete
- Psychotria fragrans (Gillespie) Fosberg
- Psychotria frakei Sohmer & A.P.Davis
- Psychotria franchetiana (Drake) Drake
- Psychotria fraseri Ridl.
- Psychotria fraterna Müll.Arg.
- Psychotria friburgensis Standl.
- Psychotria frodinii Sohmer
- Psychotria frondosa S.Moore
- Psychotria fruticetorum Standl.
- Psychotria fuertesii Urb.
- Psychotria fulvoidea King & Gamble
- Psychotria furcans Fosberg
- Psychotria fuscescens Craib
- Psychotria fuscopilosa Schltr.

== G ==
- Psychotria gabonica Hiern
- Psychotria gaboonensis Ruhsam
- Psychotria gabrieliae (Baill.) Guillaumin
- Psychotria gabrielis Müll.Arg.
- Psychotria gagneorum Lorence & W.L.Wagner
- Psychotria galintanensis Sohmer & A.P.Davis
- Psychotria gallerana Standl.
- Psychotria garberiana Christoph.
- Psychotria garciae Standl.
- Psychotria gardneri Hook.f.
- Psychotria gawadacephaelis Wernham
- Psychotria geophylax Cheek & Sonké
- Psychotria geoscopa O.Lachenaud
- Psychotria geronensis Urb.
- Psychotria ghanensis O.Lachenaud
- Psychotria gibbsiae S.Moore
- Psychotria gigantifolia O.Lachenaud
- Psychotria gigantopus K.Schum.
- Psychotria gillespieana A.C.Sm.
- Psychotria gilletii De Wild.
- Psychotria giluwensis Sohmer
- Psychotria gitingensis Elmer
- Psychotria gjellerupii A.P.Davis
- Psychotria glabra (Turrill) Fosberg
- Psychotria glabrata Sw.
- Psychotria glandulifera Thwaites ex Hook.f.
- Psychotria glaucifolia A.P.Davis & Govaerts
- Psychotria glaziovii Müll.Arg.
- Psychotria globicephala Gamble
- Psychotria globiceps K.Schum.
- Psychotria globosa Hiern
- Psychotria gneissica S.Moore
- Psychotria goetzei (K.Schum.) E.M.A.Petit
- Psychotria golmanii W.N.Takeuchi
- Psychotria goniocarpa (Baill.) Guillaumin
- Psychotria goodii Figueiredo
- Psychotria gopalanii S.Samboor.
- Psychotria gossweileri E.M.A.Petit
- Psychotria gracilicornis O.Lachenaud
- Psychotria gracilior A.C.Sm.
- Psychotria gracilipes Merr.
- Psychotria grahamii C.M.Taylor
- Psychotria graminifolia Urb.
- Psychotria grandiflora H.Mann
- Psychotria grandis Sw.
- Psychotria grandistipula Merr.
- Psychotria grandistipulata (Lauterb.) Whistler
- Psychotria grantii Fosberg
- Psychotria granulata Urb. & Ekman
- Psychotria greeneana Urb.
- Psychotria greenwelliae Fosberg
- Psychotria griffithii Hook.f.
- Psychotria griseifolia S.Moore
- Psychotria griseola K.Schum.
- Psychotria grumilia (Kuntze) E.M.A.Petit
- Psychotria guanchezii Steyerm.
- Psychotria guerkeana K.Schum.
- Psychotria guerzeensis (Schnell) O.Lachenaud
- Psychotria guianensis (Aubl.) Clos
- Psychotria guillauminiana Barrabé & Mouly
- Psychotria guineensis E.M.A.Petit
- Psychotria gundlachii Urb.
- Psychotria gyrulosa Stapf

== H ==
- Psychotria hainanensis H.L.Li
- Psychotria haitiensis Urb.
- Psychotria halophiloides Wernham
- Psychotria hamifera C.M.Taylor
- Psychotria hamiltoniana C.M.Taylor
- Psychotria hammelii Dwyer
- Psychotria hanoverensis Proctor
- Psychotria hanta Razafim. & B.Bremer
- Psychotria haplantha Bremek.
- Psychotria hardyi O.Lachenaud
- Psychotria harmandiana (Pierre ex Pit.) I.M.Turner
- Psychotria harmandii Pit.
- Psychotria hastisepala Müll.Arg.
- Psychotria hathewayi Fosberg
- Psychotria haumugaensis Sohmer
- Psychotria havilandii I.M.Turner
- Psychotria hawaiiensis (A.Gray) Fosberg
- Psychotria hawthornei O.Lachenaud
- Psychotria hebecarpa Merr. & L.M.Perry
- Psychotria hedraeocephala (Bremek.) O.Lachenaud
- Psychotria hedyotifolia Merr.
- Psychotria helferiana Kurz
- Psychotria hellwigiensis Valeton ex Sohmer
- Psychotria hemsleyi Verdc.
- Psychotria hendersoniana Craib
- Psychotria henryana Murugan & Gopalan
- Psychotria henryi H.Lév.
- Psychotria hentyi Sohmer
- Psychotria herrerana C.M.Taylor
- Psychotria herzogii S.Moore
- Psychotria heterochroa Urb.
- Psychotria heteromorpha Korth.
- Psychotria heterophylla Merr. & L.M.Perry
- Psychotria heterosticta E.M.A.Petit
- Psychotria hexamera (K.Schum.) O.Lachenaud
- Psychotria hexandra H.Mann
- Psychotria hidalgensis Borhidi
- Psychotria hilonghilongensis Sohmer & A.P.Davis
- Psychotria himanthophylla Bremek.
- Psychotria hirsuta Sw.
- Psychotria hirsuticalyx (R.D.Good) Figueiredo
- Psychotria hirsutissima O.Lachenaud
- Psychotria hirtinervia Wawra
- Psychotria hivaoana Fosberg
- Psychotria hobdyi Sohmer
- Psychotria hollandiae Valeton
- Psychotria holoxantha Urb. & Ekman
- Psychotria holstii ined.
- Psychotria holtzii (K.Schum.) E.M.A.Petit
- Psychotria homalosperma A.Gray
- Psychotria hombroniana (Baill.) Fosberg
- Psychotria homolleae Bremek.
- Psychotria hootmawaapensis Barrabé & J.Florence
- Psychotria horizontalis Sw.
- Psychotria hornitensis Dwyer & C.W.Ham.
- Psychotria hosokawae Fosberg
- Psychotria hospitalis Standl.
- Psychotria howcroftii W.N.Takeuchi
- Psychotria humbertii Bremek.
- Psychotria humblotii (Bremek.) A.P.Davis & Govaerts
- Psychotria humifera O.Lachenaud
- Psychotria humilis Hiern
- Psychotria hunteri (Horne ex Baker) A.C.Sm.
- Psychotria hylocharis Standl.
- Psychotria hymenodes (Bremek.) Razafim. & B.Bremer
- Psychotria hypargyraea A.Gray
- Psychotria hypoleuca K.Schum.
- Psychotria hypsophila K.Schum. & K.Krause

== I ==
- Psychotria ianthina Guillaumin
- Psychotria ibitipocae Standl.
- Psychotria ignea Müll.Arg.
- Psychotria ihuensis Merr. & L.M.Perry
- Psychotria ilendensis K.Krause
- Psychotria ilocana (Merr.) Merr.
- Psychotria imerinensis (Bremek.) A.P.Davis & Govaerts
- Psychotria impercepta A.C.Sm. & S.P.Darwin
- Psychotria impressinervia Merr.
- Psychotria imthurnii Turrill
- Psychotria inaequalis King & Gamble
- Psychotria inconspicua Merr. & L.M.Perry
- Psychotria induta Craib
- Psychotria inegi García Gonz. & Borhidi
- Psychotria infundibularis Hiern
- Psychotria ingentifolia E.M.A.Petit
- Psychotria insignis Standl.
- Psychotria insolens Standl.
- Psychotria insueta (Dwyer) C.W.Ham.
- Psychotria insularum A.Gray
- Psychotria integristipulata A.P.Davis & Govaerts
- Psychotria interior ined.
- Psychotria intermedia Gardner
- Psychotria interstans Domin
- Psychotria intrudens Miq.
- Psychotria ireneae Barrabé
- Psychotria iridensis Sohmer & A.P.Davis
- Psychotria iringensis Verdc.
- Psychotria irosinensis Elmer
- Psychotria irwinii Steyerm.
- Psychotria isalensis (Bremek.) A.P.Davis & Govaerts
- Psychotria issembei O.Lachenaud
- Psychotria iteophylla Stapf
- Psychotria ituriensis De Wild. ex E.Petit
- Psychotria ivakoanyensis Bremek.
- Psychotria ivorensis De Wild.
- Psychotria iwahigensis Elmer
- Psychotria ixoroides Bartl. ex DC.

== J ==
- Psychotria jamesoniana Standl.
- Psychotria janssensii O.Lachenaud
- Psychotria jasminoides Standl.
- Psychotria jefensis Dwyer ex C.M.Taylor
- Psychotria jidehensis O.Lachenaud
- Psychotria jimenezii Standl.
- Psychotria jinotegensis C.Nelson, Ant.Molina & Standl.
- Psychotria johnsii Sohmer
- Psychotria johnsonii Hook.f.
- Psychotria josephi (Kuntze) Kottaim.
- Psychotria juddii Christoph.
- Psychotria jugalis A.C.Sm.
- Psychotria juninensis Standl.

== K ==
- Psychotria kaduana (Cham. & Schltdl.) Fosberg
- Psychotria kahuziensis E.M.A.Petit
- Psychotria kairoana Sohmer
- Psychotria kajewskii Merr. & L.M.Perry
- Psychotria kamialii W.N.Takeuchi
- Psychotria kanehirae Merr.
- Psychotria kaniensis Valeton
- Psychotria kaoensis A.C.Sm.
- Psychotria karemaensis Sohmer
- Psychotria katikii Sohmer
- Psychotria kelelensis Valeton
- Psychotria kentii Razafim. & B.Bremer
- Psychotria keralensis Deb & M.G.Gangop.
- Psychotria kerrii Govaerts
- Psychotria keyensis Warb.
- Psychotria kikwitensis De Wild.
- Psychotria kilimandscharica K.Schum. ex Engl.
- Psychotria kimuenzae De Wild.
- Psychotria kitsonii Hutch. & Dalziel
- Psychotria kivuensis O.Lachenaud
- Psychotria klainei Schnell
- Psychotria klossii Craib
- Psychotria kochii Valeton
- Psychotria konguensis Hiern
- Psychotria koroiveibaui A.C.Sm.
- Psychotria korthalsiana Miq.
- Psychotria korupensis O.Lachenaud
- Psychotria kosraensis Lorence & K.R.Wood
- Psychotria koumounaboualiensis O.Lachenaud
- Psychotria kratensis Craib
- Psychotria kribiensis O.Lachenaud
- Psychotria krukovii Standl.
- Psychotria kuhliana C.M.Taylor
- Psychotria kuhlmannii Standl.
- Psychotria kumbangii Ruhsam
- Psychotria kupensis Cheek
- Psychotria kuruvolii A.C.Sm.
- Psychotria kurzii Deb & M.G.Gangop.
- Psychotria kwewonii Jongkind

== L ==
- Psychotria labatii Razafim. & B.Bremer
- Psychotria laciniata Vell.
- Psychotria lagunensis (Merr.) Merr.
- Psychotria lallanii R.Kr.Singh
- Psychotria lamarinensis C.W.Ham.
- Psychotria lanaensis (Merr.) Merr.
- Psychotria lanceifolia K.Schum.
- Psychotria lanceolaria Ridl.
- Psychotria lancilimba Merr.
- Psychotria langbianensis Wernham
- Psychotria lantzii (Bremek.) Razafim. & B.Bremer
- Psychotria laselvensis C.W.Ham.
- Psychotria lasianthifolia Valeton
- Psychotria lasianthoides Valeton
- Psychotria lasiocephala Ridl.
- Psychotria lasiophthalma Griseb.
- Psychotria lasiopus Müll.Arg.
- Psychotria lasiostylis Müll.Arg.
- Psychotria laticalyx O.Lachenaud
- Psychotria latistipula Benth.
- Psychotria laui Merr. & F.P.Metcalf
- Psychotria lauracea (K.Schum.) E.M.A.Petit
- Psychotria laurentii De Wild.
- Psychotria lavanchiei Bremek.
- Psychotria laxiflora Blume
- Psychotria laxithyrsa O.Lachenaud
- Psychotria lebrunii Cheek
- Psychotria lecomtei Pit.
- Psychotria ledermannii (K.Krause) Figueiredo
- Psychotria leeuwenbergiana O.Lachenaud
- Psychotria lehmbachii (K.Schum.) O.Lachenaud
- Psychotria leilae A.P.Davis & Govaerts
- Psychotria leiophloea Merr. & L.M.Perry
- Psychotria leiophylla Merr. & L.M.Perry
- Psychotria leitana C.M.Taylor
- Psychotria leleana Sohmer
- Psychotria leleanoides Sohmer
- Psychotria leonardiana E.M.A.Petit
- Psychotria leonardii Merr. & L.M.Perry
- Psychotria leonis Britton & P.Wilson
- Psychotria lepidocarpa Korth.
- Psychotria leptantha A.C.Sm.
- Psychotria leptophylla Hiern
- Psychotria leratii Guillaumin
- Psychotria letestui (De Wild.) N.Hallé ex O.Lachenaud
- Psychotria letouzeyi E.M.A.Petit
- Psychotria leucocalyx A.C.Sm.
- Psychotria leucocarpa Blume
- Psychotria leucocentron K.Schum.
- Psychotria leucococca K.Schum. & Lauterb.
- Psychotria leucopoda E.M.A.Petit
- Psychotria levuensis Gillespie
- Psychotria lianoides Elmer
- Psychotria liberica Hepper
- Psychotria liesneri Dwyer
- Psychotria ligustrifolia (Northr.) Millsp.
- Psychotria limba Scott Elliot
- Psychotria limitanea Standl.
- Psychotria limonensis K.Krause
- Psychotria lindleyana Müll.Arg.
- Psychotria linearifolia Bremek.
- Psychotria linearis Bartl. ex DC.
- Psychotria linearisepala E.M.A.Petit
- Psychotria lineolata Craib
- Psychotria littoralis C.M.Taylor
- Psychotria loefgrenii Standl.
- Psychotria loheri Elmer
- Psychotria lokohensis Bremek.
- Psychotria lolokiensis S.Moore
- Psychotria longicalyx O.Lachenaud
- Psychotria longicauda Valeton
- Psychotria longicornis O.Lachenaud
- Psychotria longipaniculata Sohmer
- Psychotria longipedicellata Elmer
- Psychotria longipetiolata Thwaites
- Psychotria longirostrata Valeton
- Psychotria longissima Quisumb. & Merr.
- Psychotria longituba A.Chev. ex De Wild.
- Psychotria loniceroides Sieber ex DC.
- Psychotria lopezii Acuña & Roíg
- Psychotria lophocarpa O.Lachenaud
- Psychotria lorenciana C.M.Taylor
- Psychotria lorentzii Valeton
- Psychotria louisii E.M.A.Petit
- Psychotria lovettii Borhidi & Verdc.
- Psychotria lubutuensis De Wild.
- Psychotria lucens Hiern
- Psychotria lucidifolia Standl.
- Psychotria lucidula Baker
- Psychotria lunanii Urb.
- Psychotria lundellii Standl.
- Psychotria luteofructa C.M.Taylor
- Psychotria luteola Merr. & L.M.Perry
- Psychotria lutescens Craib
- Psychotria luzoniensis (Cham. & Schltdl.) Fern.-Vill.
- Psychotria lycioides (Baill.) Guillaumin

== M ==
- Psychotria macbridei Standl.
- Psychotria macgregorii Merr.
- Psychotria macrocalyx A.Gray
- Psychotria macrocarpa Hook.f.
- Psychotria macrochlamys (Bremek.) A.P.Davis & Govaerts
- Psychotria macroglossa (Baill.) Guillaumin
- Psychotria macroserpens Fosberg
- Psychotria madagascariensis Razafim. & B.Bremer
- Psychotria madulidii Sohmer & A.P.Davis
- Psychotria maesenii O.Lachenaud
- Psychotria mafuluensis S.Moore
- Psychotria magnifica (Gillespie) Fosberg
- Psychotria magnifolia Merr.
- Psychotria magnisepala Bremek.
- Psychotria magnistipula O.Lachenaud
- Psychotria mahonii C.H.Wright
- Psychotria maingayi Hook.f.
- Psychotria malacorrhax (Lauterb. & K.Schum.) Valeton
- Psychotria malaloensis Merr. & L.M.Perry
- Psychotria malaspinae Merr.
- Psychotria malayana Jack
- Psychotria malchairii De Wild.
- Psychotria malcomberiana C.M.Taylor
- Psychotria maleolens Urb.
- Psychotria maliensis Schnell
- Psychotria malmei (Standl.) Zappi
- Psychotria manambolensis A.P.Davis & Govaerts
- Psychotria manampanihensis (Bremek.) A.P.Davis & Govaerts
- Psychotria mandiocana Müll.Arg.
- Psychotria mandrarensis (Bremek.) A.P.Davis & Govaerts
- Psychotria mangenotii (Aké Assi) Verdc.
- Psychotria mangorensis (Bremek.) A.P.Davis & Govaerts
- Psychotria manillensis Bartl. ex DC.
- Psychotria maningoryensis A.P.Davis & Govaerts
- Psychotria manna Urb.
- Psychotria mannii Hiern
- Psychotria manongarivensis A.P.Davis & Govaerts
- Psychotria mapiriensis Standl.
- Psychotria marafungaensis Sohmer
- Psychotria maranhana Müll.Arg.
- Psychotria marantifolia O.Lachenaud
- Psychotria marauensis Fosberg & Florence
- Psychotria marcgraviella Standl.
- Psychotria marchionica Drake
- Psychotria marginata Sw.
- Psychotria mariana Bartl. ex DC.
- Psychotria maricaensis Urb.
- Psychotria mariguidonensis Sohmer & A.P.Davis
- Psychotria mariniana (Cham. & Schltdl.) Fosberg
- Psychotria marmeladensis Urb.
- Psychotria maroensis (Bremek.) A.P.Davis & Govaerts
- Psychotria marojejensis Bremek.
- Psychotria martinetugei Cheek
- Psychotria martiusii Müll.Arg.
- Psychotria matagalpensis C.M.Taylor
- Psychotria matambuaii W.N.Takeuchi
- Psychotria mauiensis Fosberg
- Psychotria mayana W.N.Takeuchi
- Psychotria maynasana C.M.Taylor
- Psychotria meeboldii Deb & M.G.Gangop.
- Psychotria megacarpa Ridl.
- Psychotria megacoma Miq.
- Psychotria megalocalyx Müll.Arg.
- Psychotria megalocarpa (Bremek.) A.P.Davis & Govaerts
- Psychotria megalopus Verdc.
- Psychotria megistantha E.M.A.Petit
- Psychotria megistophylla Standl.
- Psychotria mekongensis Pit.
- Psychotria melaneoides Wernham
- Psychotria melanocarpa Merr. & L.M.Perry
- Psychotria melanotricha Müll.Arg.
- Psychotria menalohensis (Bremek.) A.P.Davis & Govaerts
- Psychotria mendozii Sohmer & A.P.Davis
- Psychotria merrillii Kaneh.
- Psychotria merrittii Merr.
- Psychotria merrittioides Sohmer & A.P.Davis
- Psychotria mesentericarpa Baker
- Psychotria mexiae Standl.
- Psychotria miae A.P.Davis & Govaerts
- Psychotria micheliae (J.-G.Adam) Jongkind & W.D.Hawth.
- Psychotria micheliana J.-G.Adam
- Psychotria micralabastra (Lauterb. & K.Schum.) Valeton
- Psychotria micrantha Kunth
- Psychotria microcarpa Müll.Arg.
- Psychotria micrococca (Lauterb. & K.Schum.) Valeton
- Psychotria microglossa (Baill.) Baill. ex Guillaumin
- Psychotria microgrammata Bremek.
- Psychotria micromyrtus (Baill.) Schltr.
- Psychotria microthyrsa E.M.A.Petit
- Psychotria mildbraedii (K.Krause) O.Lachenaud
- Psychotria milnei (A.Gray) K.Schum.
- Psychotria mima Standl.
- Psychotria mindanaensis Merr.
- Psychotria mindoroensis Elmer
- Psychotria mineirensis Wernham
- Psychotria miniata Merr. & L.M.Perry
- Psychotria minima R.D.Good
- Psychotria minuta E.M.A.Petit
- Psychotria minutifoveolata Merr.
- Psychotria miombicola Verdc.
- Psychotria mirandae C.W.Ham.
- Psychotria misolensis Valeton ex Sohmer
- Psychotria moensis Britton & P.Wilson
- Psychotria molinae Standl.
- Psychotria molleri K.Schum.
- Psychotria mollipes K.Krause
- Psychotria monanthos (Baill.) Schltr.
- Psychotria monensis Cheek & Séné
- Psychotria moninensis (Hiern) E.M.A.Petit
- Psychotria monocarpa Fosberg
- Psychotria monsalveae C.M.Taylor
- Psychotria montensis Moore
- Psychotria monteverdensis Dwyer & C.W.Ham.
- Psychotria monticola Kurz
- Psychotria montisgiluwensis A.P.Davis & Ruhsam
- Psychotria montisstellaris (P.Royen) A.P.Davis & Ruhsam
- Psychotria montivaga C.M.Taylor
- Psychotria montrouzieri Barrabé & J.Florence
- Psychotria moonii Hook.f.
- Psychotria moramangensis (Bremek.) Razafim. & B.Bremer
- Psychotria moratii Razafim. & B.Bremer
- Psychotria morindiflora Wall. ex Hook.f.
- Psychotria morindoides Hutch.
- Psychotria morley-smithiae A.P.Davis & Govaerts
- Psychotria mornicola Urb.
- Psychotria morobensis Sohmer
- Psychotria mortehanii De Wild.
- Psychotria muellerdomboisii W.N.Takeuchi
- Psychotria muelleriana Wawra
- Psychotria multicapitata King & Gamble
- Psychotria multicostata Valeton
- Psychotria multinervia Ridl.
- Psychotria multipedunculata Sohmer
- Psychotria multiplex Müll.Arg.
- Psychotria mumfordiana F.Br.
- Psychotria munda Standl.
- Psychotria murmurensis Sohmer
- Psychotria muschleriana K.Krause
- Psychotria muscicola Valeton
- Psychotria mutabilis C.M.Taylor
- Psychotria mwinilungae Verdc.
- Psychotria mycetoides Valeton
- Psychotria myristica I.M.Turner
- Psychotria myrmecophila K.Schum. & Lauterb.
- Psychotria myrsinoides Merr. & L.M.Perry
- Psychotria myrstiphyllum Sw.

== N ==
- Psychotria nacdado Guillaumin
- Psychotria nagapatensis Merr.
- Psychotria naguana Urb.
- Psychotria namwingensis Govaerts
- Psychotria nandarivatensis A.C.Sm.
- Psychotria nanifrutex Sohmer
- Psychotria nathaliae (Baill.) Guillaumin
- Psychotria nebulosa K.Krause
- Psychotria negrosensis Elmer
- Psychotria neillii C.W.Ham. & Dwyer
- Psychotria nekouana (Baill.) Guillaumin
- Psychotria neodouarrei Barrabé & A.Martini
- Psychotria nerei O.Lachenaud
- Psychotria nervosa Sw.
- Psychotria nesophila F.Muell.
- Psychotria neurosticta O.Lachenaud
- Psychotria neurothrix Müll.Arg.
- Psychotria ngotphamii Bao, Tagane, Yahara & V.S.Dang
- Psychotria niauensis Butaud & J.Florence
- Psychotria nicobarica Kurz
- Psychotria nieuwenhuizii Valeton
- Psychotria nigerica Hepper
- Psychotria nigotei Barrabé
- Psychotria nigra (Gaertn.) Alston
- Psychotria nigropunctata Hiern
- Psychotria nilgiriensis Deb & M.G.Gangop.
- Psychotria nimbana Schnell
- Psychotria nitens (Merr.) Merr.
- Psychotria nitidula Cham. & Schltdl.
- Psychotria niveobarbata (Müll.Arg.) Britton
- Psychotria njumei Cheek
- Psychotria nodiflora O.Lachenaud & D.J.Harris
- Psychotria nossibensis A.P.Davis & Govaerts
- Psychotria notopleuroides C.M.Taylor
- Psychotria noxia A.St.-Hil.
- Psychotria nubica Delile
- Psychotria nubicola G.Taylor
- Psychotria nubiphila Dwyer
- Psychotria nubisylvae O.Lachenaud
- Psychotria nuda (Cham. & Schltdl.) Wawra
- Psychotria nudiflora Wight & Arn.
- Psychotria nummularioides Guillaumin
- Psychotria nymannii ined.
- Psychotria nzabii O.Lachenaud

== O ==
- Psychotria oaxacensis Borhidi & Salas-Mor.
- Psychotria oblongicarpa Borhidi & Oviedo
- Psychotria obovalis A.Rich.
- Psychotria obovatifolia De Wild.
- Psychotria obscura Zoll. & Moritzi
- Psychotria obscurinervia Merr.
- Psychotria obtegens Müll.Arg.
- Psychotria obtusifolia Lam. ex Poir.
- Psychotria occidentalis Steyerm.
- Psychotria ochroleuca Standl.
- Psychotria octosulcata Talbot
- Psychotria oinochrophylla (Standl.) C.M.Taylor
- Psychotria oleifolia (Kunth) Standl.
- Psychotria olgae Dwyer & M.V.Hayden
- Psychotria oligocarpa K.Schum.
- Psychotria oligoneura Pierre ex Pit.
- Psychotria olivacea Valeton
- Psychotria oliveri Lorence & W.L.Wagner
- Psychotria olsenii Sohmer & A.P.Davis
- Psychotria ombrophila (Schnell) Verdc.
- Psychotria onanae O.Lachenaud
- Psychotria onivensis (Bremek.) A.P.Davis & Govaerts
- Psychotria oocarpa Bremek.
- Psychotria opaca Müll.Arg.
- Psychotria opima Standl.
- Psychotria orbicalyx O.Lachenaud
- Psychotria oreadum S.Moore
- Psychotria oreotrephes (Bremek.) A.P.Davis & Govaerts
- Psychotria orgyalis Merr. & L.M.Perry
- Psychotria orophila E.M.A.Petit
- Psychotria orosiana Standl.
- Psychotria orosioides C.M.Taylor
- Psychotria ortiziana C.M.Taylor
- Psychotria osiana W.N.Takeuchi & Pipoly
- Psychotria ossaeana Urb.
- Psychotria oua-tilouensis Guillaumin
- Psychotria oubatchensis Schltr.
- Psychotria ovatistipula C.M.Taylor
- Psychotria ovoidea Wall. ex Hook.f.
- Psychotria owariensis (P.Beauv.) Hiern

== P ==
- Psychotria pachyantha A.C.Sm.
- Psychotria pachycalyx O.Lachenaud
- Psychotria pachygrammata Bremek.
- Psychotria pachyphylla (King & Gamble) Ridl.
- Psychotria pachythalla Urb.
- Psychotria pacifica K.Schum.
- Psychotria pacorensis C.W.Ham.
- Psychotria paeonia C.M.Taylor
- Psychotria palawanensis Elmer
- Psychotria palifera C.M.Taylor
- Psychotria palimlimensis Sohmer & A.P.Davis
- Psychotria pallens Gardner
- Psychotria pallida Valeton
- Psychotria pallidicalyx O.Lachenaud
- Psychotria pallidifolia Merr.
- Psychotria paloensis Elmer
- Psychotria paludicola Merr. & L.M.Perry
- Psychotria paludosa Müll.Arg.
- Psychotria palustris E.M.A.Petit
- Psychotria panamensis Standl.
- Psychotria panayensis Merr.
- Psychotria pancheri (Baill.) Schltr.
- Psychotria pandoana C.M.Taylor
- Psychotria pandurata Verdc.
- Psychotria papanga Razafim. & B.Bremer
- Psychotria papantlensis (Oerst.) Hemsl.
- Psychotria papillata (Merr.) Merr.
- Psychotria papuana (Wernham) H.St.John
- Psychotria paracalensis Sohmer & A.P.Davis
- Psychotria paradoxalis (Bremek.) A.P.Davis & Govaerts
- Psychotria paravillosa C.M.Taylor
- Psychotria parkeri Baker
- Psychotria parvifolia Benth.
- Psychotria parvihama C.M.Taylor
- Psychotria parvistipulata E.M.A.Petit
- Psychotria parvula A.Gray
- Psychotria patentinervia Müll.Arg.
- Psychotria patentivenia Miq.
- Psychotria patulinervia Merr. & Quisumb. ex Sohmer & A.P.Davis
- Psychotria patuloneura O.Lachenaud
- Psychotria pauciflora Bartl. ex DC.
- Psychotria paucinervia Merr.
- Psychotria paulae J.-Y.Mey., Lorence & J.Florence
- Psychotria pavairiensis Sohmer
- Psychotria pearcei Standl.
- Psychotria pectinata Steyerm.
- Psychotria peduncularis (Salisb.) Steyerm.
- Psychotria pedunculosa Rich.
- Psychotria peekeliana Valeton
- Psychotria penangensis Hook.f.
- Psychotria pendens M.A.Bautista & R.Bustam.
- Psychotria pendula Hook.f.
- Psychotria penduliflora Ridl.
- Psychotria pendulothyrsa O.Lachenaud
- Psychotria pentaphtosa Müll.Arg.
- Psychotria perbrevis K.Schum.
- Psychotria perferruginea Steyerm.
- Psychotria pergamena Korth.
- Psychotria perijaensis Steyerm.
- Psychotria pernitida Urb.
- Psychotria perrieri Bremek.
- Psychotria pervillei Baker
- Psychotria peteri E.M.A.Petit
- Psychotria petiginosa Brenan
- Psychotria petiolosa Valeton
- Psychotria petitii Verdc.
- Psychotria phaeochlamys (Lauterb. & K.Schum.) Valeton
- Psychotria phaeochlamysioides Sohmer
- Psychotria phanerophlebia Merr.
- Psychotria phaneroplexa Standl.
- Psychotria philacra Dwyer
- Psychotria phuquocensis Bao, Vuong & V.S.Dang
- Psychotria phyllocalymma Müll.Arg.
- Psychotria phyllocalymmoides Müll.Arg.
- Psychotria pichisensis Standl.
- Psychotria pickeringii A.Gray
- Psychotria pilifera Hutch.
- Psychotria pilosella Elmer
- Psychotria pilulifera King & Gamble
- Psychotria pinetorum Urb.
- Psychotria pininsularis Guillaumin
- Psychotria pinnatinervia Elmer
- Psychotria piolampra K.Schum.
- Psychotria piperi Merr.
- Psychotria pisonioides Standl.
- Psychotria pittosporifolia Fosberg
- Psychotria plana Craib
- Psychotria plantaginoidea E.M.A.Petit
- Psychotria platycocca A.Gray
- Psychotria platyneura Kurz
- Psychotria pleeana Urb.
- Psychotria pleuropoda Donn.Sm.
- Psychotria plicata Urb.
- Psychotria plumeriifolia Elmer
- Psychotria plumieri Urb.
- Psychotria pluriceps Standl.
- Psychotria plurivenia Thwaites
- Psychotria pocsii Borhidi & Verdc.
- Psychotria podantha (Fosberg) A.C.Sm.
- Psychotria podocarpa E.M.A.Petit
- Psychotria poilanei Pit.
- Psychotria poissoniana (Baill.) Guillaumin ex S.Moore
- Psychotria poliostemma Benth.
- Psychotria polita Valeton
- Psychotria polycarpa (Miq.) Hook.f.
- Psychotria polygrammata Bremek.
- Psychotria polyphylla Bremek.
- Psychotria polytricha Miq.
- Psychotria ponce-leonis Acuña & Roíg
- Psychotria porphyroclada K.Schum.
- Psychotria potamophila K.Schum.
- Psychotria potanthera Wernham
- Psychotria praecox Valeton ex Sohmer
- Psychotria prainii H.Lév.
- Psychotria principensis G.Taylor
- Psychotria prismoclavata (Fosberg) A.C.Sm.
- Psychotria pritchardii Seem.
- Psychotria pseudaxillaris (Wernham) Delprete
- Psychotria pseudoixora Pit.
- Psychotria pseudomaschalodesme W.N.Takeuchi
- Psychotria pseudomicrodaphne Guillaumin
- Psychotria pseudoplatyphylla E.M.A.Petit
- Psychotria psychotriifolia (Seem.) Standl.
- Psychotria psychotrioides (DC.) Roberty
- Psychotria pteropus O.Lachenaud & D.J.Harris
- Psychotria puberulina (Müll.Arg.) Standl.
- Psychotria pubiflora (A.Gray) Fosberg
- Psychotria pubilimba Quisumb.
- Psychotria pubinoda Standl. ex Steyerm.
- Psychotria pubituba S.Moore
- Psychotria puffii Razafim. & B.Bremer
- Psychotria pulchrebracteata Guillaumin
- Psychotria pulchrinervis Borhidi & Oviedo
- Psychotria pulchristipula (Bremek.) Razafim. & B.Bremer
- Psychotria pulgarensis Sohmer & A.P.Davis
- Psychotria pulleniana Sohmer
- Psychotria pumila Hiern
- Psychotria punctata Vatke
- Psychotria purdiaei Urb.
- Psychotria purpurea Merr. & L.M.Perry
- Psychotria puyoana C.M.Taylor
- Psychotria pygmaea Merr.
- Psychotria pygmaeodendron K.Schum.
- Psychotria pyramidata Elmer
- Psychotria pyrrotricha (Bremek.) A.P.Davis & Govaerts

== Q ==
- Psychotria quisumbingiana Sohmer & A.P.Davis

== R ==
- Psychotria rabeniana Müll.Arg.
- Psychotria radicans (Merr.) Merr.
- Psychotria radicifera O.Lachenaud
- Psychotria raiateensis J.W.Moore
- Psychotria raivavaensis Fosberg
- Psychotria rakotonasoloi A.P.Davis & Govaerts
- Psychotria rakotoniaina A.P.Davis & Govaerts
- Psychotria rakotovaoi C.M.Taylor
- Psychotria ramadecumbens Sohmer
- Psychotria rambouensis De Wild.
- Psychotria ramosii Merr.
- Psychotria ramosissima Elmer
- Psychotria ramuensis Sohmer
- Psychotria ramulosa Merr. & L.M.Perry
- Psychotria randiana Merr. & L.M.Perry
- Psychotria ranomafanensis C.M.Taylor
- Psychotria rapensis F.Br.
- Psychotria ratovoarisonii A.P.Davis & Govaerts
- Psychotria rauwolfioides Standl.
- Psychotria raynaliorum O.Lachenaud
- Psychotria razafimandimbisonii C.M.Taylor
- Psychotria razakamalalae C.M.Taylor
- Psychotria rectinervis Urb.
- Psychotria recurva Hiern
- Psychotria reducta Baker
- Psychotria reflexapedunculata Sohmer
- Psychotria reflexiloba Borhidi & Oviedo
- Psychotria reflexipes Borhidi & Oviedo
- Psychotria refracta Müll.Arg.
- Psychotria refractiflora K.Schum.
- Psychotria reineckei K.Schum.
- Psychotria reitsmarum O.Lachenaud
- Psychotria remota Benth.
- Psychotria repanda Ruiz & Pav.
- Psychotria reptans Benth.
- Psychotria resurrecta Wernham
- Psychotria reticulatissima S.Moore
- Psychotria reticulosa Valeton
- Psychotria retiphlebia Baker
- Psychotria retrofracta O.Lachenaud
- Psychotria retrorsipilis O.Lachenaud
- Psychotria retusa (Bremek.) A.P.Davis & Govaerts
- Psychotria revoluta DC.
- Psychotria reynosoi Sohmer & A.P.Davis
- Psychotria rhinocerotis Reinw. ex Blume
- Psychotria rhizomatosa De Wild.
- Psychotria rhodotricha Pit.
- Psychotria rhombibracteata C.M.Taylor & M.T.Campos
- Psychotria rhombocarpa Kaneh.
- Psychotria rhombocarpoides Hosok.
- Psychotria rhonhofiae K.Krause
- Psychotria rhynchodiscus O.Lachenaud
- Psychotria rhytidocarpa Müll.Arg.
- Psychotria ridleyi King & Gamble
- Psychotria rigescens Standl.
- Psychotria rigidifolia (Elmer) Merr.
- Psychotria rimbachii Standl.
- Psychotria rivularis Urb.
- Psychotria robertii Standl.
- Psychotria robusta Blume
- Psychotria romolerouxiana C.M.Taylor
- Psychotria rondonii Delprete
- Psychotria roseata (Fosberg) A.C.Sm.
- Psychotria rosella (Bremek.) A.P.Davis & Govaerts
- Psychotria roseotincta S.Moore
- Psychotria rosmarinifolia (Baill.) Schltr.
- Psychotria rosseliensis Sohmer
- Psychotria rosulata O.Lachenaud
- Psychotria rosulatifolia Dwyer
- Psychotria rotensis Kaneh.
- Psychotria roxburghii DC.
- Psychotria rubefacta (S.Moore) Guillaumin
- Psychotria rubens Borhidi & Oviedo
- Psychotria rubescens (Hiern) O.Lachenaud
- Psychotria rubiginosa Elmer ex Merr.
- Psychotria rubiginosissima Wernham
- Psychotria rubriceps O.Lachenaud & Jongkind
- Psychotria rubriflora O.Lachenaud
- Psychotria rubripilis K.Schum.
- Psychotria rubristipulata R.D.Good
- Psychotria rubropedicellata (Bremek.) A.P.Davis & Govaerts
- Psychotria rubropilosa De Wild.
- Psychotria rudis Ridl.
- Psychotria rufidula Standl.
- Psychotria rufipes Hook.f.
- Psychotria rufiramea Standl.
- Psychotria rufocalyx Fosberg
- Psychotria rufovaginata Griseb.
- Psychotria rufovillosa (Bremek.) A.P.Davis & Govaerts
- Psychotria rugulosa Kunth
- Psychotria ruhsamiana A.P.Davis & Govaerts
- Psychotria ruizii Standl.
- Psychotria rupicola (Baill.) Schltr.
- Psychotria russellii Deb & M.G.Gangop.
- Psychotria rutila Craib

== S ==
- Psychotria saccata O.Lachenaud
- Psychotria sacciformis C.M.Taylor
- Psychotria sadebeckiana K.Schum.
- Psychotria sagittalis (Baill.) Guillaumin
- Psychotria sakaleonensis Bremek.
- Psychotria salentana Standl.
- Psychotria saloiana Diels
- Psychotria saltatrix C.M.Taylor
- Psychotria saltiensis (S.Moore) Guillaumin
- Psychotria salzmanniana Müll.Arg.
- Psychotria samarensis Merr.
- Psychotria sambiranensis Bremek.
- Psychotria samoritourei Cheek
- Psychotria sanluisensis Steyerm.
- Psychotria santaremica Müll.Arg.
- Psychotria sarapiquensis Standl.
- Psychotria sarcocarpa Merr.
- Psychotria sarcodes Merr. & L.M.Perry
- Psychotria sarmentosa Blume
- Psychotria sarmentosoides Valeton
- Psychotria sarmiensis Sohmer
- Psychotria sastrei Steyerm.
- Psychotria satabiei O.Lachenaud
- Psychotria sauvallei Urb.
- Psychotria scaberula Merr.
- Psychotria scabrida Bremek.
- Psychotria schaeferi Lorence & W.L.Wagner
- Psychotria schatzii Razafim. & B.Bremer
- Psychotria scheffleri K.Schum. & K.Krause
- Psychotria schlechteriana K.Krause
- Psychotria schliebenii E.M.A.Petit
- Psychotria schnellii (Aké Assi) Verdc.
- Psychotria schultzei Valeton
- Psychotria schumanniana Schltr.
- Psychotria schweinfurthii Hiern
- Psychotria scitula A.C.Sm.
- Psychotria scortechinii King & Gamble
- Psychotria scytophylla Bremek.
- Psychotria secundiflora Valeton
- Psychotria sellowiana (DC.) Müll.Arg.
- Psychotria semifissa Müll.Arg.
- Psychotria semperflorens (Beauvis.) Pancher ex Prain
- Psychotria sempervirens E.T.Geddes
- Psychotria sentanensis Valeton
- Psychotria senterrei O.Lachenaud
- Psychotria serpens L.
- Psychotria setistipulata (R.D.Good) E.M.A.Petit
- Psychotria setulifera C.M.Taylor
- Psychotria shaferi Urb.
- Psychotria sibuyanensis Elmer
- Psychotria sidamensis Cufod.
- Psychotria silhetensis Hook.f.
- Psychotria silhouettae F.Friedmann
- Psychotria silvicola Müll.Arg.
- Psychotria simianensis A.P.Davis & Govaerts
- Psychotria simmondsiana F.M.Bailey
- Psychotria sinuata C.M.Taylor
- Psychotria siphonophora Urb.
- Psychotria sitae O.Lachenaud
- Psychotria sixaolensis C.W.Ham.
- Psychotria sloanei Urb.
- Psychotria smaragdina Standl.
- Psychotria smithiae E.T.Geddes
- Psychotria sogerensis Wernham
- Psychotria sohmeri Kiehn
- Psychotria sohmeriana I.M.Turner
- Psychotria sohotonensis Sohmer & A.P.Davis
- Psychotria solanoides Turrill
- Psychotria solfiana K.Krause
- Psychotria solomonensis Merr. & L.M.Perry
- Psychotria sonkeana O.Lachenaud & Séné
- Psychotria sonocorova (Bremek.) A.P.Davis & Govaerts
- Psychotria sopkinii C.M.Taylor
- Psychotria sordida Thwaites
- Psychotria sororia DC.
- Psychotria sorsogonensis Elmer
- Psychotria soteropolitana Müll.Arg.
- Psychotria spachiana (Baill.) Guillaumin ex Barrabé & Mouly
- Psychotria sparsipila Bremek.
- Psychotria spathacea (Hiern) Verdc.
- Psychotria spathicalyx Müll.Arg.
- Psychotria spathulifolia O.Lachenaud
- Psychotria speciosa G.Forst.
- Psychotria sphaerocarpa Wall.
- Psychotria sphaeroidea Urb.
- Psychotria sphaerothyrsa Valeton
- Psychotria spicata Benth.
- Psychotria spithamea S.Moore
- Psychotria srilankensis Ruhsam
- Psychotria st-johnii Fosberg
- Psychotria steinii Steyerm.
- Psychotria stenantha A.C.Sm.
- Psychotria stenocalyx Müll.Arg.
- Psychotria stenostegia O.Lachenaud
- Psychotria stevedarwiniana W.N.Takeuchi
- Psychotria stevensiana Sohmer
- Psychotria stigmatophylla K.Schum.
- Psychotria stolonifera W.N.Takeuchi
- Psychotria storckii Seem.
- Psychotria streimannii Sohmer
- Psychotria stricta K.Schum.
- Psychotria strigosa Müll.Arg.
- Psychotria striolata K.Krause
- Psychotria suarezensis A.P.Davis & Govaerts
- Psychotria subacuminalis Müll.Arg.
- Psychotria subalpina Elmer
- Psychotria subcapitata Bremek.
- Psychotria subcaudata Valeton
- Psychotria subcordata Britton
- Psychotria subcucullata Merr.
- Psychotria suber van Jaarsv. & S.Venter
- Psychotria subglabra De Wild.
- Psychotria subintegra (Wight & Arn.) Hook.f.
- Psychotria sublyrata O.Lachenaud
- Psychotria submontana Domin
- Psychotria subnubila Bremek.
- Psychotria subobliqua Hiern
- Psychotria subobovata Miq.
- Psychotria subpunctata Hiern
- Psychotria subremota Müll.Arg.
- Psychotria subscandens Müll.Arg.
- Psychotria subsessiliflora Elmer
- Psychotria subsessilis Benth.
- Psychotria subsimplex Merr.
- Psychotria subspathacea Müll.Arg.
- Psychotria subspathulata (Müll.Arg.) C.M.Taylor
- Psychotria subvelutina Ekman & Urb.
- Psychotria succulenta (Hiern) E.M.A.Petit
- Psychotria suffruticosa Müll.Arg.
- Psychotria sulcata Wall. ex Hook.f.
- Psychotria sulitii Merr. & Quisumb. ex Sohmer & A.P.Davis
- Psychotria sumatrensis Ridl.
- Psychotria sumbavana Miq.
- Psychotria surianii Urb.
- Psychotria surigaoensis Sohmer & A.P.Davis
- Psychotria suterella Müll.Arg.
- Psychotria sutericalyx Wernham
- Psychotria sycophylla (K.Schum.) E.M.A.Petit
- Psychotria sylvatica Blume
- Psychotria sylvieana Razafim. & B.Bremer
- Psychotria sylvivaga Standl.
- Psychotria symplocifolia Kurz
- Psychotria synactica O.Lachenaud

== T ==
- Psychotria taedoumgii O.Lachenaud
- Psychotria tahanensis Ruhsam
- Psychotria tahitensis (Drake) Drake
- Psychotria taitensis Verdc.
- Psychotria talasensis Sohmer
- Psychotria tanganyicensis Verdc.
- Psychotria tatamana Standl.
- Psychotria taupotinii F.Br.
- Psychotria taviunensis Gillespie
- Psychotria tawaensis Merr.
- Psychotria taxifolia Bremek.
- Psychotria tayabensis Elmer
- Psychotria tchoutoi O.Lachenaud
- Psychotria temehaniensis J.W.Moore
- Psychotria temetiuensis Lorence & W.L.Wagner
- Psychotria tenuicaulis K.Krause
- Psychotria tenuifolia Sw.
- Psychotria tenuinervis Müll.Arg.
- Psychotria tenuipes Merr. & L.M.Perry
- Psychotria tenuipetiolata Verdc.
- Psychotria tenuirachis Valeton
- Psychotria tenuis Merr. & L.M.Perry
- Psychotria tenuissima E.M.A.Petit
- Psychotria tephrosantha A.Gray
- Psychotria ternata Bremek.
- Psychotria ternatifolia W.N.Takeuchi
- Psychotria terniflora (A.Rich. ex DC.) Razafim. & B.Bremer
- Psychotria testacea Sohmer
- Psychotria tetragonoides Fosberg
- Psychotria tetragonopus O.Lachenaud & Jongkind
- Psychotria teysmanniana (Miq.) Boerl.
- Psychotria thailandensis Ruhsam
- Psychotria thelophora Urb.
- Psychotria thomensis G.Taylor
- Psychotria thomsonii Hook.f.
- Psychotria thonneri (De Wild. & T.Durand) O.Lachenaud
- Psychotria thorelii Pit.
- Psychotria timonioides Fosberg
- Psychotria titanophylla O.Lachenaud
- Psychotria tolongoinensis A.P.Davis & Govaerts
- Psychotria tomaniviensis A.C.Sm.
- Psychotria tomentella (S.Moore) Zappi
- Psychotria toninensis S.Moore
- Psychotria tonkinensis Pit.
- Psychotria torrei Acuña & Roíg
- Psychotria torrenticola O.Lachenaud & Séné
- Psychotria toviana F.Br.
- Psychotria trichantha Baker
- Psychotria trichanthera K.Schum.
- Psychotria trichocalyx (Drake) Fosberg ex J.-Y.Mey., Lorence & J.Florence
- Psychotria trichocarpa Valeton
- Psychotria trichotoma M.Martens & Galeotti
- Psychotria triclada E.M.A.Petit
- Psychotria tripedunculata Sohmer
- Psychotria trisulcata (Baill.) Guillaumin
- Psychotria trivialis Rusby
- Psychotria trujilloi Steyerm.
- Psychotria truncata Wall.
- Psychotria tsaratananensis A.P.Davis & Govaerts
- Psychotria tsiandrensis Bremek.
- Psychotria tsiandroi Razafim. & B.Bremer
- Psychotria tsimihetensis Razafim. & B.Bremer
- Psychotria tubuaiensis Fosberg
- Psychotria tubulocubensis Govaerts
- Psychotria turbinata A.Gray
- Psychotria turrubarensis W.C.Burger & Q.Jiménez
- Psychotria tutcheri Dunn
- Psychotria tylophora Kurz

== U ==
- Psychotria uahukensis Lorence & W.L.Wagner
- Psychotria uapacifolia O.Lachenaud
- Psychotria uapoensis Lorence & W.L.Wagner
- Psychotria uberabana Müll.Arg.
- Psychotria ulei Standl.
- Psychotria umbellifera E.M.A.Petit
- Psychotria uncumariana C.M.Taylor
- Psychotria unicarinata (Fosberg) A.C.Sm. & S.P.Darwin
- Psychotria urbaniana Steyerm.
- Psychotria urdanetensis Elmer
- Psychotria usambarensis Verdc.
- Psychotria utakwensis Wernham

== V ==
- Psychotria vaccinioides Valeton
- Psychotria vaccinioidifolia Sohmer
- Psychotria valetoniana Sohmer
- Psychotria valleculata A.C.Sm.
- Psychotria vanhermanii Acuña & Roíg
- Psychotria vanimoensis Sohmer
- Psychotria vanoverberghii Merr.
- Psychotria varians O.Lachenaud
- Psychotria vasudevae Murugan & Arisdason
- Psychotria veillonii Barrabé
- Psychotria velutina Elmer
- Psychotria venosa (Hiern) E.M.A.Petit
- Psychotria verdcourtii Borhidi
- Psychotria verschuerenii De Wild.
- Psychotria versteegii Deb & M.G.Gangop.
- Psychotria verticissaxi Valeton
- Psychotria vescula A.C.Sm.
- Psychotria vestita C.Presl
- Psychotria vieillardii (Baill.) Guillaumin
- Psychotria viguieri (Bremek.) A.P.Davis & Govaerts
- Psychotria villicarpa O.Lachenaud
- Psychotria villosa Ruiz & Pav.
- Psychotria vinkii Sohmer
- Psychotria viridialba Urb.
- Psychotria viridiflora Reinw. ex Blume
- Psychotria viridis Ruiz & Pav.
- Psychotria vishwanathii R.Kr.Singh
- Psychotria viticoides Wernham
- Psychotria vitiensis Fosberg
- Psychotria vogeliana Benth.
- Psychotria volii R.O.Gardner
- Psychotria vololoniaina Razafim. & B.Bremer
- Psychotria voluta Elmer
- Psychotria vomensis Gillespie
- Psychotria voorhoevei O.Lachenaud
- Psychotria vulpina Ridl.

== W ==
- Psychotria wagapensis Guillaumin
- Psychotria waimamurensis Merr. & L.M.Perry
- Psychotria waiuensis Sohmer
- Psychotria walikalensis E.M.A.Petit
- Psychotria warburgiana A.P.Davis
- Psychotria warmingii Müll.Arg.
- Psychotria warongloaensis Hochr.
- Psychotria wawrae Sohmer
- Psychotria wawrana Müll.Arg.
- Psychotria weberbaueri Standl.
- Psychotria weberi Merr.
- Psychotria welwitschii (Hiern) Bremek.
- Psychotria wenzelii (Merr.) Merr.
- Psychotria wernhamiana S.Moore
- Psychotria wesselsboeri Steyerm.
- Psychotria whistleri Fosberg
- Psychotria wiakabui W.N.Takeuchi
- Psychotria wichmannii Valeton
- Psychotria wieringae O.Lachenaud
- Psychotria wilkesiana Standl.
- Psychotria williamsii Standl.
- Psychotria winitii Craib
- Psychotria winkleri Merr.
- Psychotria wollastonii Wernham
- Psychotria womersleyi Sohmer
- Psychotria wonotobensis (Bremek.) Steyerm.
- Psychotria woodii Merr.
- Psychotria woronovii Standl.
- Psychotria woytkowskii Dwyer & M.V.Hayden
- Psychotria wrayi King & Gamble
- Psychotria wullschlaegelii Urb.

== X ==
- Psychotria xanthochlora K.Schum.
- Psychotria xantholoba Müll.Arg.
- Psychotria xiriricana Standl. ex Hoehne

== Y ==
- Psychotria yagawensis Sohmer & A.P.Davis
- Psychotria yaoundensis O.Lachenaud
- Psychotria yapaensis Sohmer
- Psychotria yapasensis Standl.
- Psychotria yapoensis (Schnell) Verdc.
- Psychotria yaracuyensis Steyerm.
- Psychotria yatesii (Merr.) Merr.
- Psychotria yavitensis Steyerm.
- Psychotria yenii Sohmer & A.P.Davis
- Psychotria yunnanensis Hutch.

== Z ==
- Psychotria zapotecana Borhidi & Salas-Mor.
- Psychotria zepelaciana Standl.
- Psychotria zeylanica Sohmer
- Psychotria zombamontana (Kuntze) E.M.A.Petit
