= Lemonwood =

Lemonwood may refer to:

== Plants ==
- Calycophyllum candidissimum (Vahl) DC. or dagame, a tree native to Central America and vicinity
- Pittosporum eugenioides A.Cunn. or tarata, a tree native to New Zealand
- Psychotria capensis (Eckl.) Vatke or bird-berry, a tree native to southern Africa
- Schisandra sphenanthera Rehder & E.H.Wilson, a climbing plant native to China
- Xymalos monospora (Harv.) Baill., a tree of the Afromontane highlands in Africa

== Places ==
- Lemonwood, a neighborhood in Oxnard, California
