= The Forests and Forest Flora of the Colony of the Cape of Good Hope =

- Author: Thomas Robertson Sim
- Language: English
- Publisher: Taylor & Henderson
- Publication date: 1907

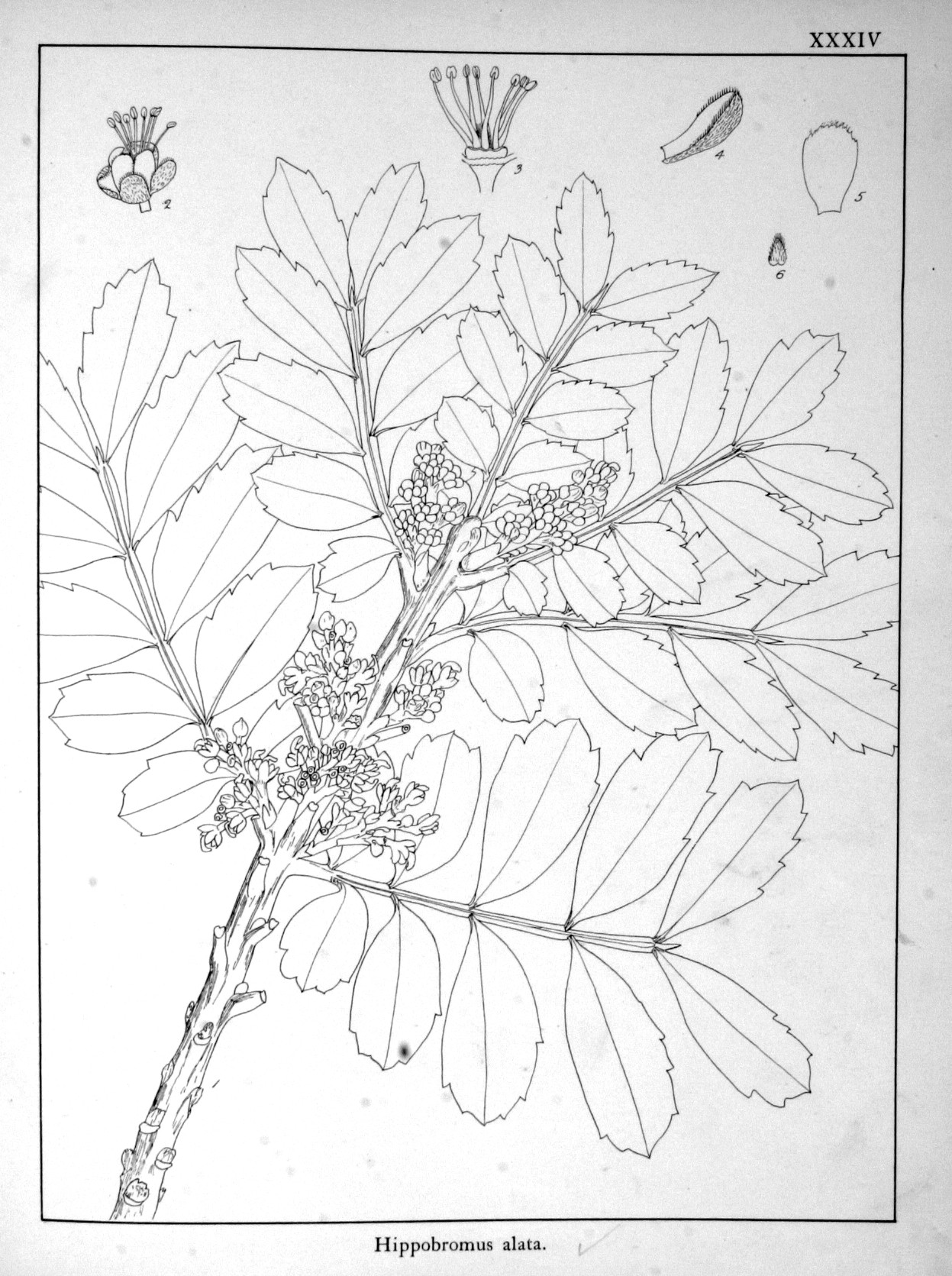
Hippobromus alata

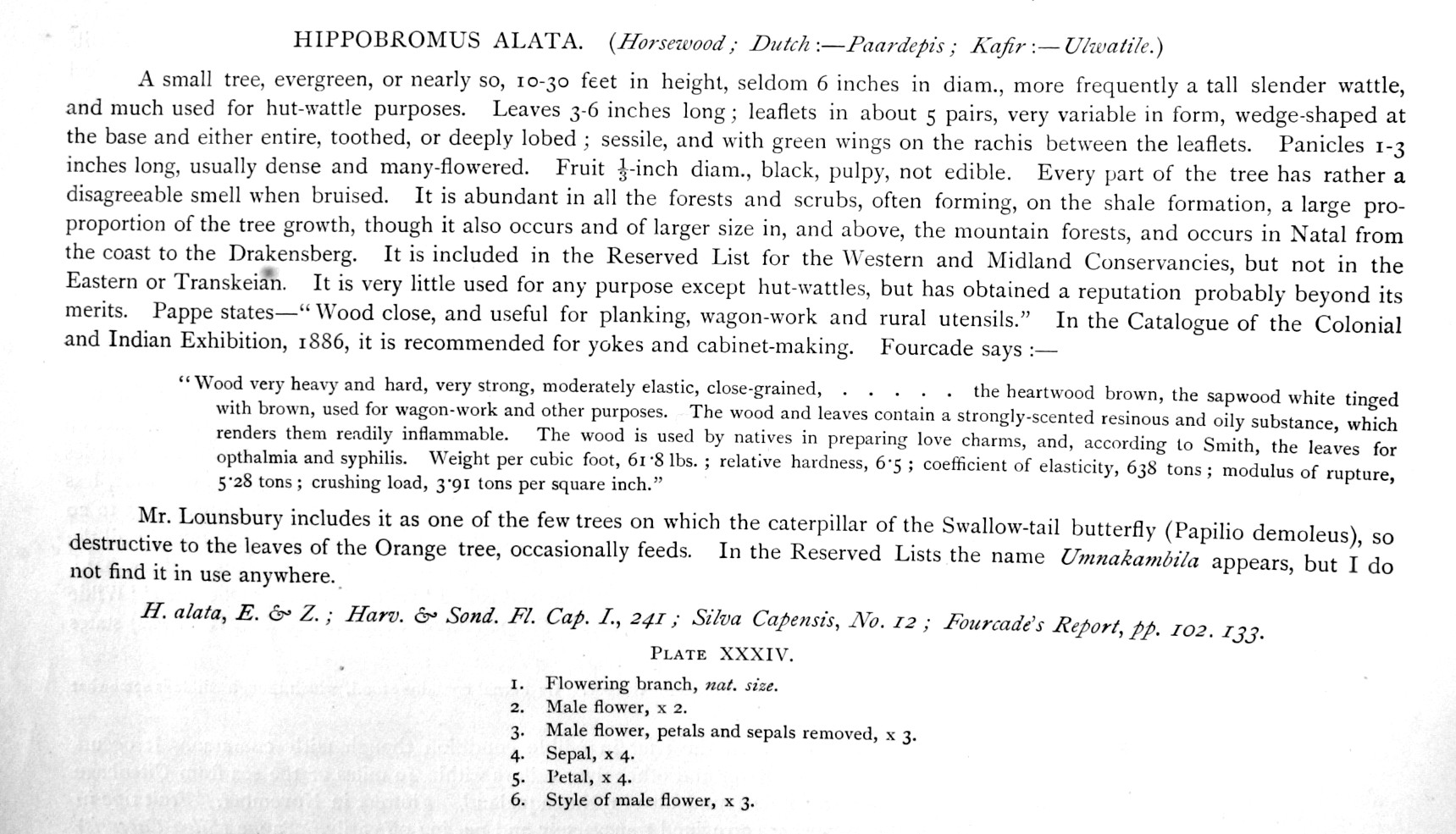
Hippobromus alata

The Forests and Forest Flora of the Colony of the Cape of Good Hope is a botanical reference book written and illustrated by Thomas Robertson Sim, published in 1907 by Taylor & Henderson of Aberdeen. At the time of the book's publishing, Sim was the Conservator of Forests of Natal, and had been the District Forest Officer in King William's Town, bringing a wealth of experience to the work as an experienced author of botanical literature and a plant collector.

== Format ==
The book is of large quarto format (240mm x 300mm) and consists of 365 pages of text followed by 160 plates of line drawings by the author.
