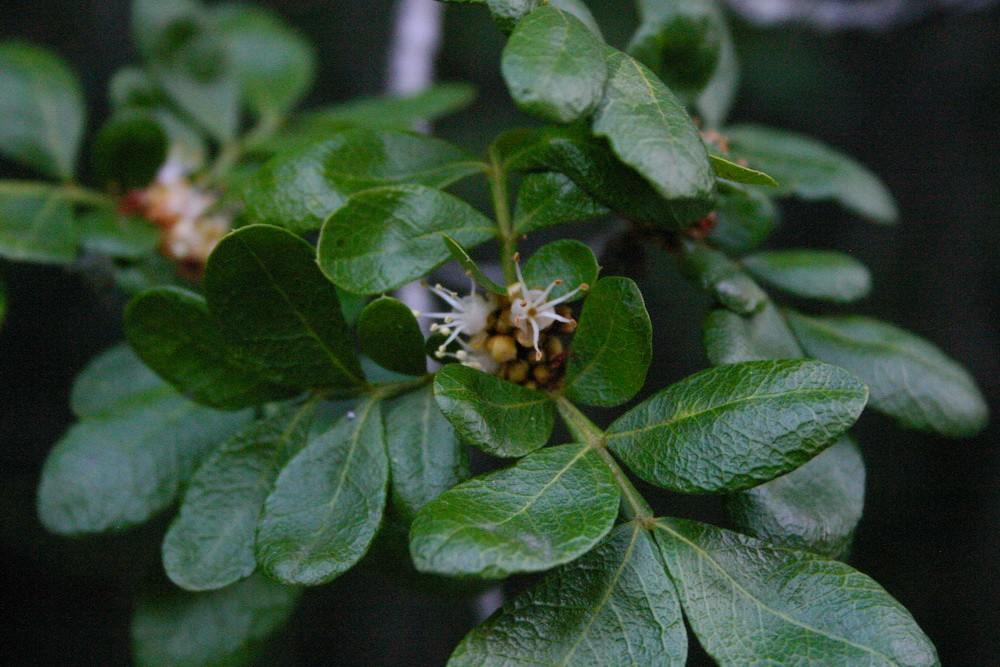

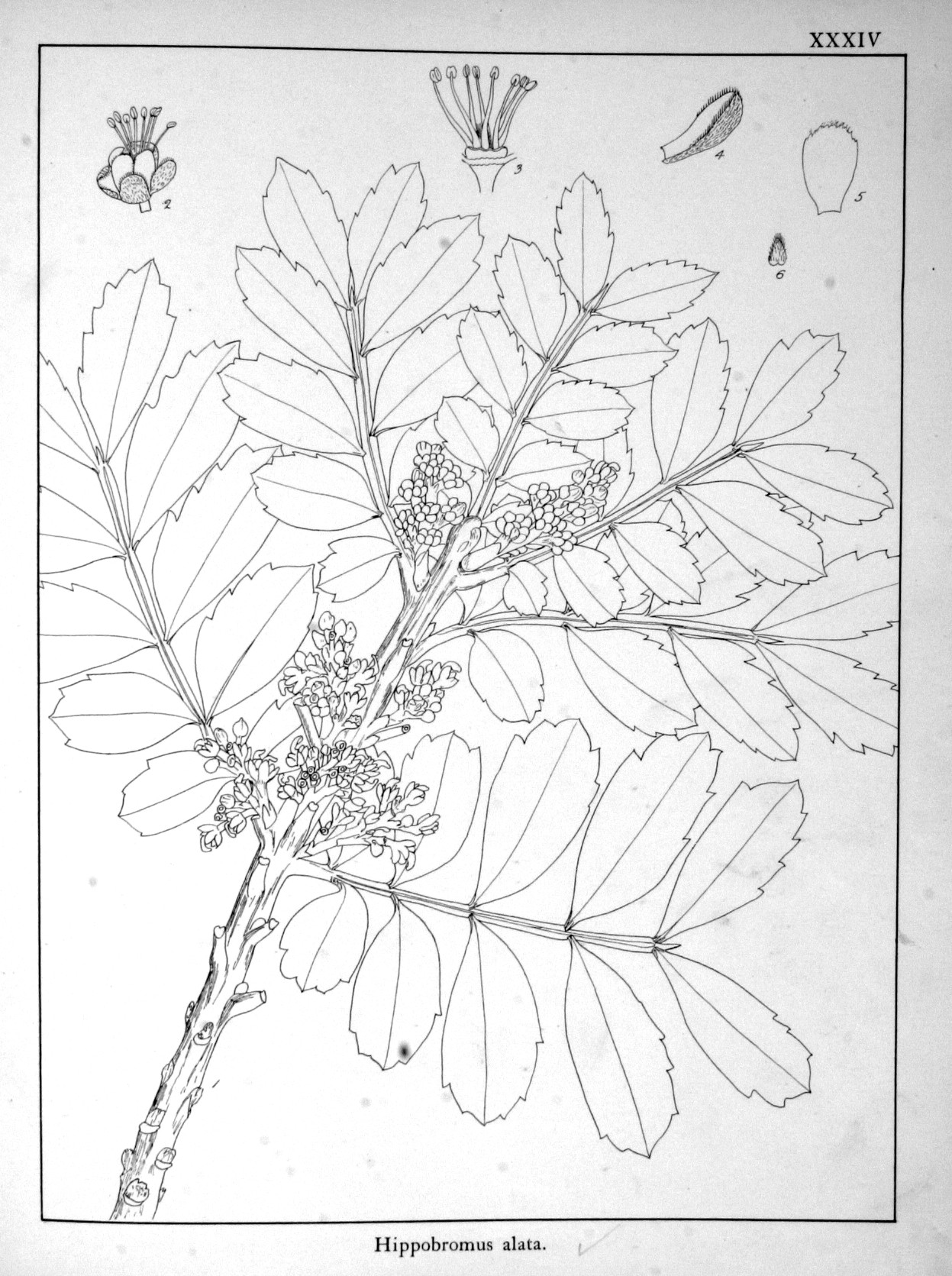
- Plate from The Forests and Forest Flora of the Colony of the Cape of Good Hope by Thomas Robertson Sim (1858-1938)

Scientific classification
- Kingdom: Plantae
- Clade: Tracheophytes
- Clade: Angiosperms
- Clade: Eudicots
- Clade: Rosids
- Order: Sapindales
- Family: Sapindaceae
- Subfamily: Dodonaeoideae
- Genus: Hippobromus; Eckl. & Zeyh.
- Species: H. pauciflorus

Binomial name
- Hippobromus pauciflorus (L.f.) Radlk.

Synonyms
- Hippobromus alatus Eckl. & Zeyh.

= Hippobromus =

Genus of plants

Hippobromus is a genus of flowering plants belonging to the family Sapindaceae. Its native range is Southern Africa. The only species is Hippobromus pauciflorus (Afrikaans: Baster-perdepis = false horse urine), commonly known as false horsewood.

== Description ==
It is a small semi-deciduous tree occurring on the margins of forest, stream banks and in scrub forest. Frequently growing as a tall, slender sapling and accordingly prized as wattle for hut-building. Leaves 75 to 150 mm (3.0 to 5.9 in) long, paripinnate with some 5 pairs of leaflets which are extremely variable in shape, wedge-shaped at the base, entire, dentate or deeply lobed, sessile and winged on the rachis between leaflets. Panicles up to 75 mm (3.0 in) long and many-flowered. Fruits are about 8 mm (0.31 in) in diameter, black, pulpy and unpalatable. All parts of the tree have an unpleasant odour when bruised. Fourcade describes the wood as "very heavy and hard, very strong, moderately elastic, close-grained ... heartwood brown, sapwood white, tinged with brown, used for wagon-work and other purposes. The wood and leaves contain a strongly scented resinous and oily substance, which renders them readily inflammable." This tree is found along the east coast from the Eastern Cape, through KwaZulu Natal, Eswatini and further inland through the Transvaal up to the Soutpansberg.
