= Psychotria hirsuta =

Scientific classification
- Kingdom: Plantae
- Clade: Tracheophytes
- Clade: Angiosperms
- Clade: Eudicots
- Clade: Asterids
- Order: Gentianales
- Family: Rubiaceae
- Genus: Psychotria
- Species: P. hirsuta

Binomial name
- Psychotria hirsuta Sw.

Synonyms
- Uragoga hirsuta (Sw.) Kuntze

Species of flowering plant

Psychotria hirsuta is a species of plant in the family Rubiaceae. It is native to Jamaica.
