= Psychotria samoritourei =

Conservation status
- Vulnerable (IUCN 3.1)

Scientific classification
- Kingdom: Plantae
- Clade: Tracheophytes
- Clade: Angiosperms
- Clade: Eudicots
- Clade: Asterids
- Order: Gentianales
- Family: Rubiaceae
- Genus: Psychotria
- Species: P. samoritourei

Binomial name
- Psychotria samoritourei Cheek

Species of liana

Psychotria samoritourei is a liana species belonging to the family Rubiaceae, native to the forests of the Loma-Man highlands in Upper Guinea, West Africa. It is the sixth known lianescent African species of its genus. It is found in Guinea, Liberia and Sierra Leone. It is also possible that the species is present in other, less thoroughly surveyed areas of the submontane forests of the Loma-Man highlands. If discovered, it is likely that the threat status of the species would be reduced. It is a climber to at least 10 m, and possibly up to 20 m.
