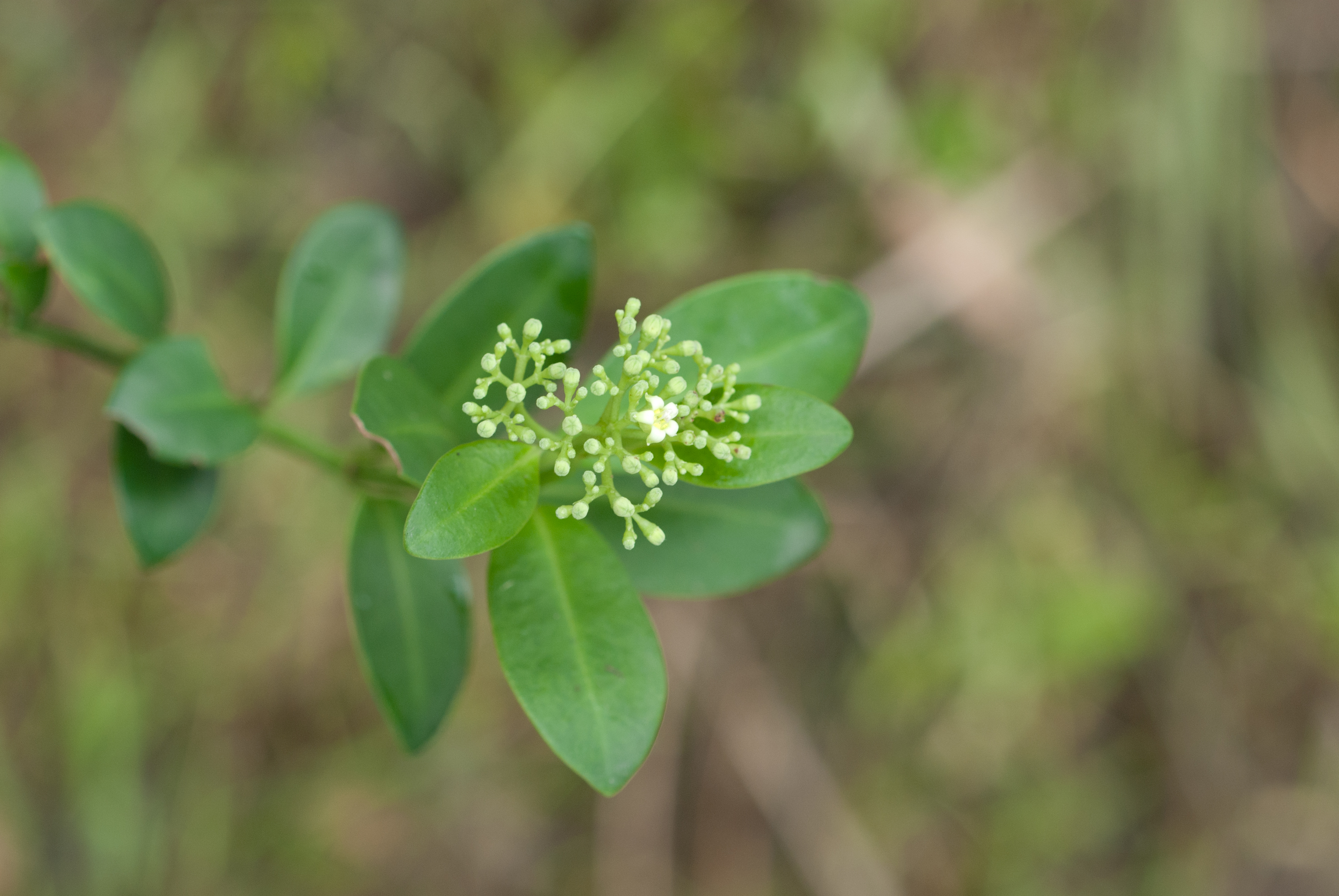
- Inflorescence
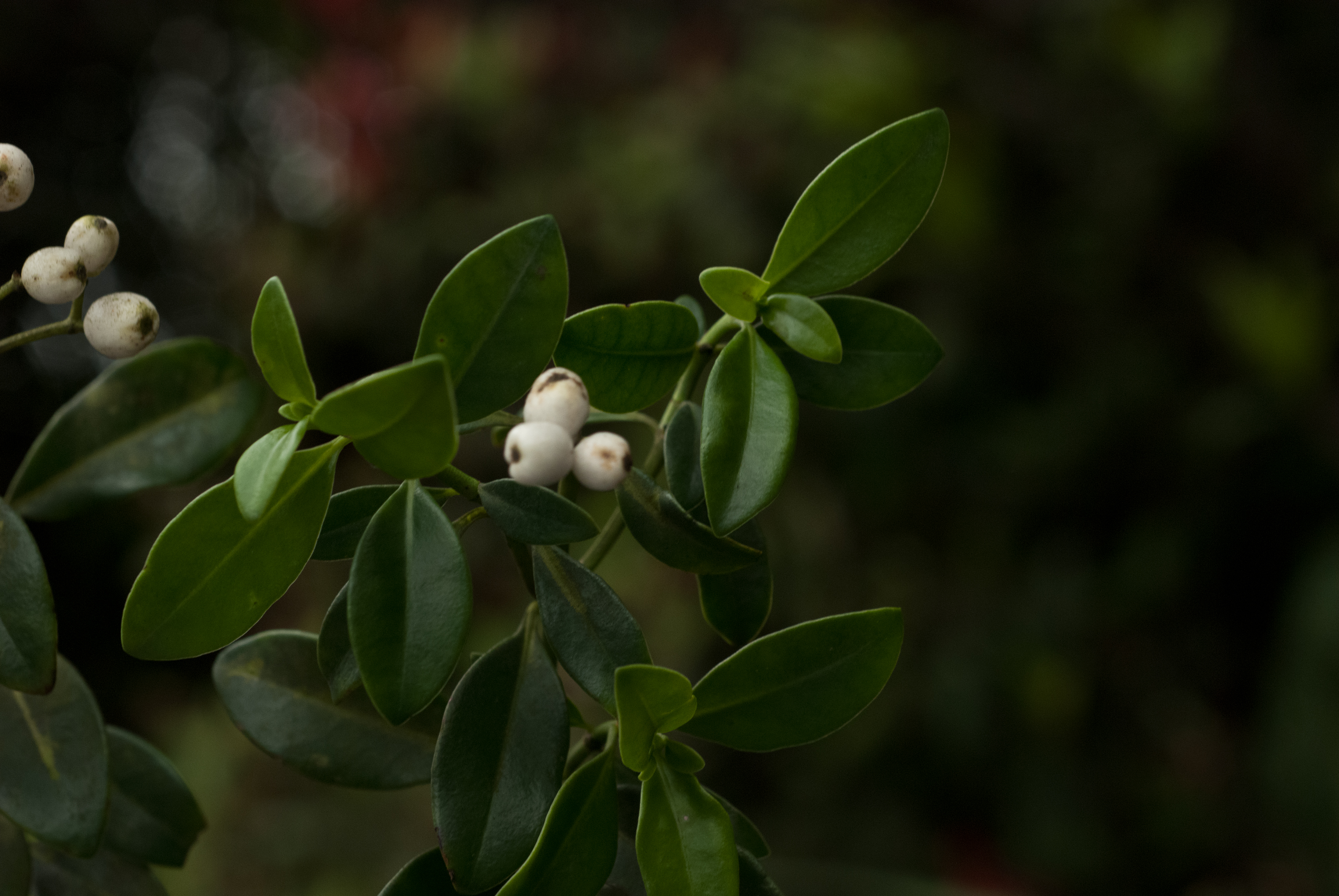
- Fruit

Scientific classification
- Kingdom: Plantae
- Clade: Tracheophytes
- Clade: Angiosperms
- Clade: Eudicots
- Clade: Asterids
- Order: Gentianales
- Family: Rubiaceae
- Genus: Psychotria
- Species: P. serpens

Binomial name
- Psychotria serpens L.

Synonyms
- Grumilea serpens (L.) K.Schum.; Psychotria scandens Hook. & Arn.; Psychotria serpens var. latifolia Pit.; Uragoga serpens (L.) Kuntze

= Psychotria serpens =

Species of plant

Psychotria serpens, the creeping psychotria, is a species of flowering plant in the family Rubiaceae, native to Peninsular Malaysia, Southeast Asia, southeastern China, Hainan, Taiwan, the Ryukyu Islands, and central and southern Japan. A creeping or climbing perennial liana, it is typically found in thickets and forests, from 100 to 1,400 m (300 to 4,600 ft) above sea level. It is often substituted for "Caulis Trachelospermi" (Trachelospermum jasminoides) in traditional Chinese medicine preparations sold to people with cancer.
