= Psychotria simmondsiana =

- Numinbah, New South Wales

Conservation status
- Least Concern (NCA)

Scientific classification
- Kingdom: Plantae
- Clade: Tracheophytes
- Clade: Angiosperms
- Clade: Eudicots
- Clade: Asterids
- Order: Gentianales
- Family: Rubiaceae
- Genus: Psychotria
- Species: P. simmondsiana

Binomial name
- Psychotria simmondsiana F.M Bailey, 1891

Species of flowering plant

Psychotria simmondsiana, known commonly as the small psychotria, is a species of shrub or small tree in the coffee family Rubiaceae that occurs primarily in South East Queensland and northern New South Wales in Australia.

== Habitat & distribution ==
The species primarily inhabits rainforests in eastern Australia, with small, disjunct populations residing in Carnarvon National Park and in the Wet Tropics.

== Description ==
It can grow as a shrub or tree to a height of 5 metres. The species has a perennial life cycle and is hermaphroditic. The species has a erect or spreading growth habit. Its white-cream flowers bloom from December to February. The species features fleshy, indehiscent and drupaceous fruit. The species is evergreen. The leaves have entire margins with elliptical, narrowly elliptical, obovate or ovate leaf shapes. The length of the leaves is 90 millimetres and the width of the leaves is 20 millimetres.

== Conservation ==
Under the Nature Conservation Act 1992 in Queensland it has been classified as Least Concern.
