= Psychotria alba =

Scientific classification
- Kingdom: Plantae
- Clade: Tracheophytes
- Clade: Angiosperms
- Clade: Eudicots
- Clade: Asterids
- Order: Gentianales
- Family: Rubiaceae
- Genus: Psychotria
- Species: P. alba

Binomial name
- Psychotria alba Ruiz & Pav.

Synonyms
- Mapouria alba (Ruiz & Pav.) Müll.Arg.; Uragoga alba (Ruiz & Pav.) Kuntze; Psychotria densiflora Humb. & Bonpl. ex Schult.; Psychotria hundensis Humb. & Bonpl. ex Schult.; Psychotria patula Humb. & Bonpl. ex Schult.

Species of flowering plant

Psychotria alba is a species of plant in the coffee and gardenia family Rubiaceae. It is native to Colombia, Peru and Venezuela.
