= Psychotria jugalis =

Scientific classification
- Kingdom: Plantae
- Clade: Tracheophytes
- Clade: Angiosperms
- Clade: Eudicots
- Clade: Asterids
- Order: Gentianales
- Family: Rubiaceae
- Genus: Psychotria
- Species: P. jugalis

Binomial name
- Psychotria jugalis A.C.Sm.

Species of plant

Psychotria jugalis is a plant species belonging to the family Rubiaceae. It is endemic to Fiji. This species is also part of the order Gentianales. The species Psychotria jugalis itself is part of the genus Psychotria. The scientific name of this species was first published by Albert Charles Smith.
