= Psychotria poliostemma =

Conservation status
- Least Concern (NCA)

Scientific classification
- Kingdom: Plantae
- Clade: Tracheophytes
- Clade: Angiosperms
- Clade: Eudicots
- Clade: Asterids
- Order: Gentianales
- Family: Rubiaceae
- Genus: Psychotria
- Species: P. poliostemma

Binomial name
- Psychotria poliostemma Benth.

Species of flowering plant

Psychotria poliostemma is a species of shrub in the family Rubiaceae that is endemic to Australia.

== Habitat & distribution ==
The species occurs primarily in Queensland, where it is relatively abundant across the eastern seaboard. Records indicate its presence from River Heads near Hervey Bay in the south up to the top of Cape York Peninsula in the north. There are also isolated occurrences in Arnhem Land in the Northern Territory. It grows in mainly in vine thickets, monsoon forest and other types of closed forest most frequently on sand dunes close to the sea.

== Description ==
Plants in this species can grow to a maximum height of 5 metres, although it usually only grows 1 to 3 metres tall. The species has a perennial life cycle and is hermaphroditic. The species flowers from January to June and fruits from January to July. The flowers are white. The species features fleshy, indehiscent and drupaceous fruit about 7 x 7 mm and cream or pale yellow in colour. The species is evergreen. The leaves have broad bases and bifid apices. The length of the leaves is 115 millimetres and the width of the leaves is 65 millimetres.

== Conservation ==
Under the Nature Conservation Act 1992 in Queensland it has been classified as Least Concern.
