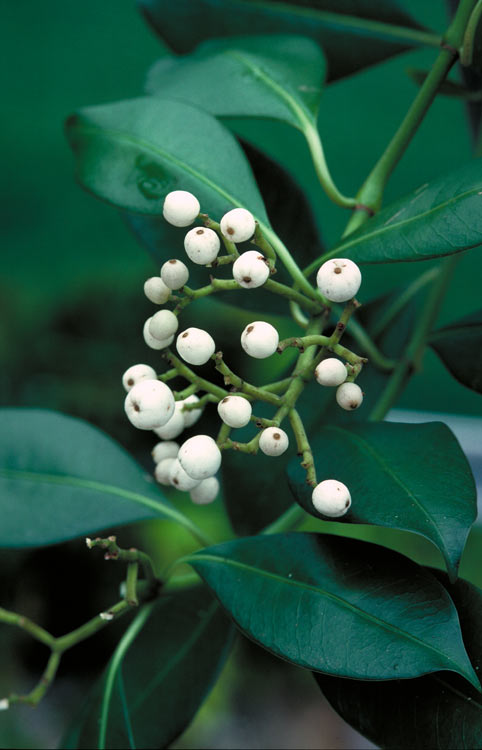

Conservation status
- Least Concern (NCA)

Scientific classification
- Kingdom: Plantae
- Clade: Tracheophytes
- Clade: Angiosperms
- Clade: Eudicots
- Clade: Asterids
- Order: Gentianales
- Family: Rubiaceae
- Genus: Psychotria
- Species: P. coelospermum

Binomial name
- Psychotria coelospermum F.M.Bailey

= Psychotria coelospermum =

Species of flowering plant

Psychotria coelospermum is a vine in the coffee family Rubiaceae found only in the Northern Territory and Queensland, Australia. It is a root climber with a slender stem and leaves arranged in opposite pairs, each measuring up to 14 cm (5.5 in) long by 7 cm (2.8 in) wide. Flowers are produced in panicles from October to December, followed by white fruits about 15 mm (0.6 in) diameter from February to June. It grows in swamps and very wet areas in rainforest. It was first described by the Queensland government botanist Frederick Manson Bailey in 1904.

== Conservation ==
This species is listed as least concern under the Queensland Government's Nature Conservation Act. As of 23 June 2024, it has not been assessed by the International Union for Conservation of Nature (IUCN).

== Gallery ==
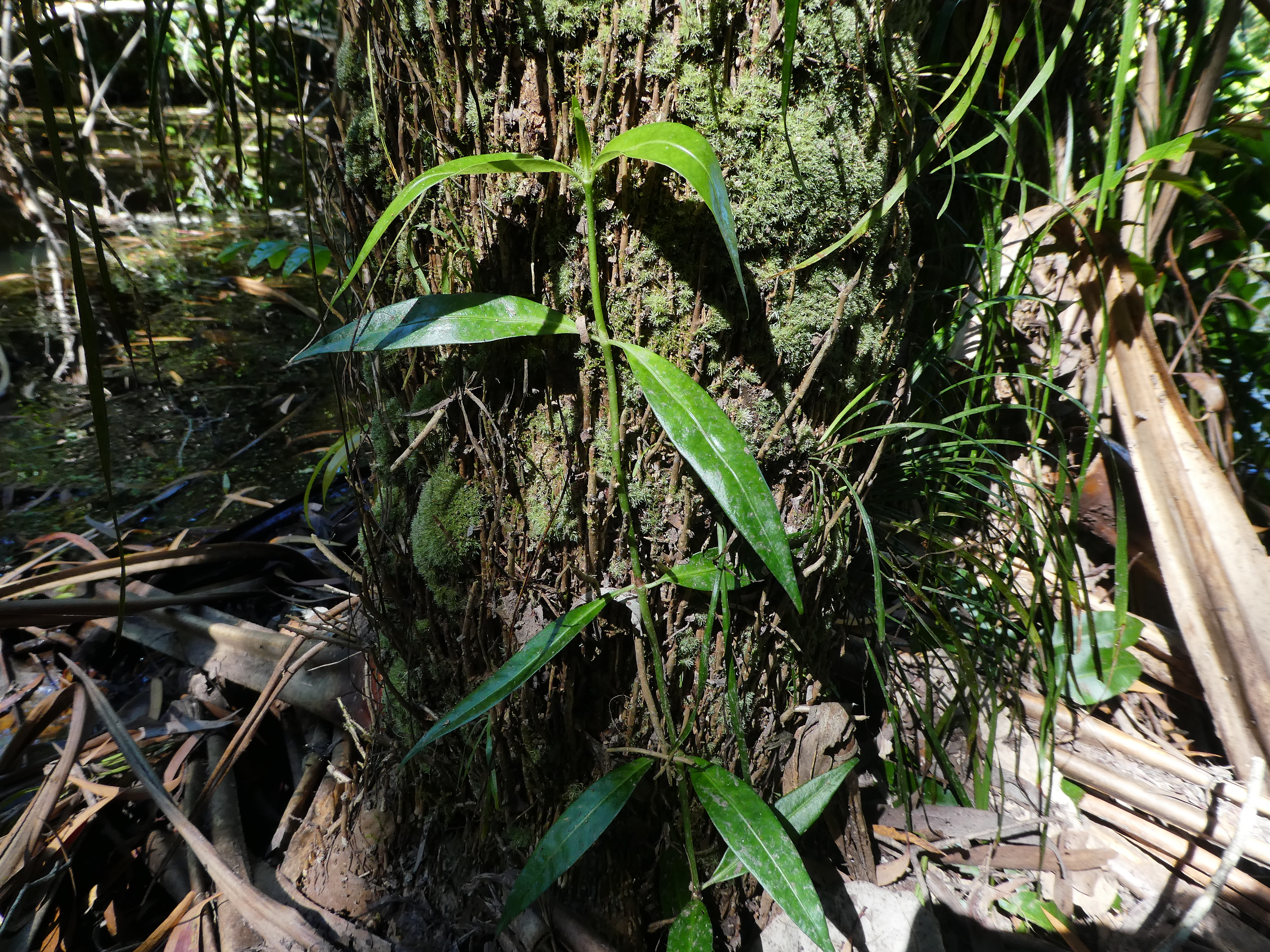
Habit

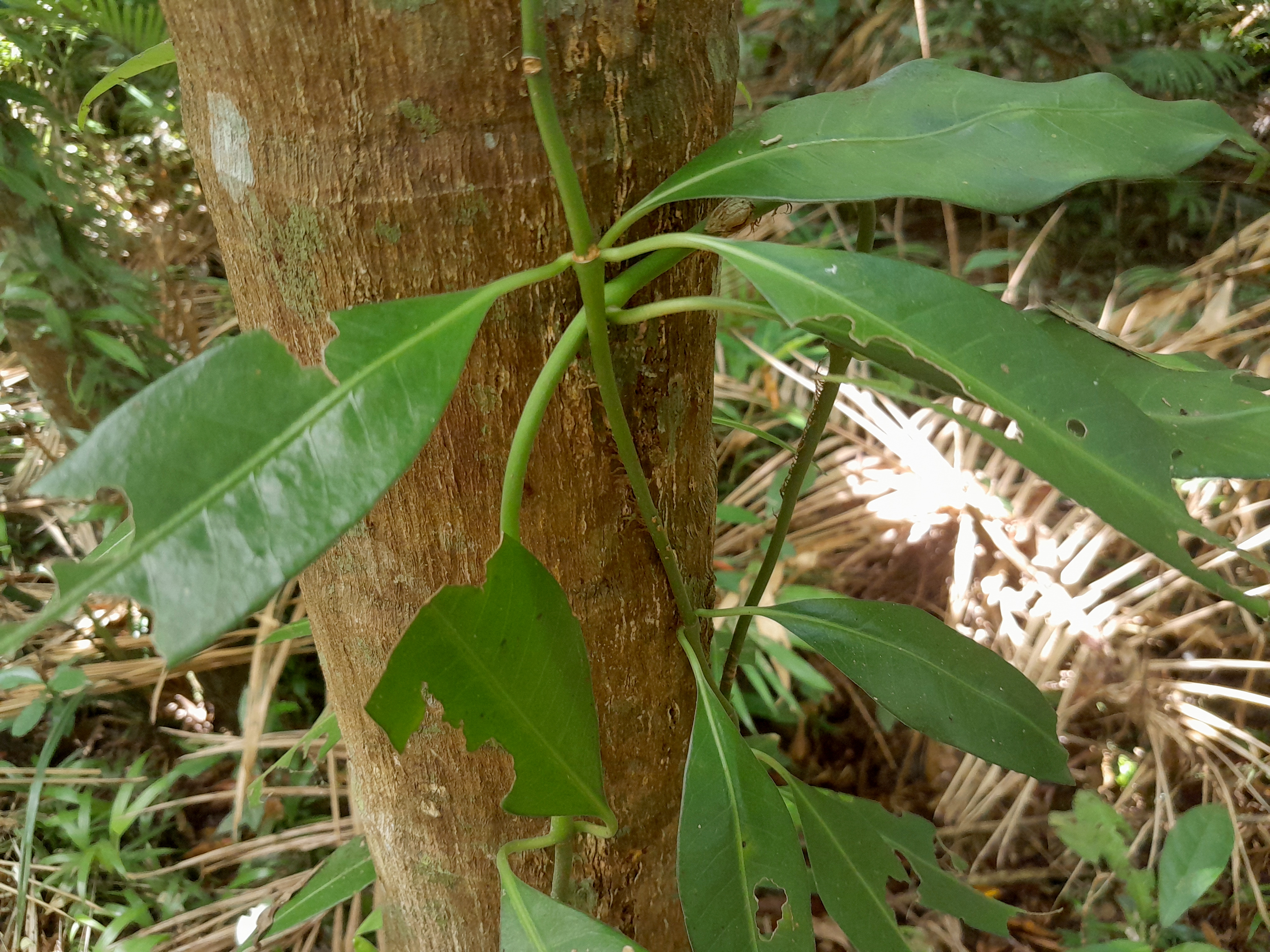
Habit

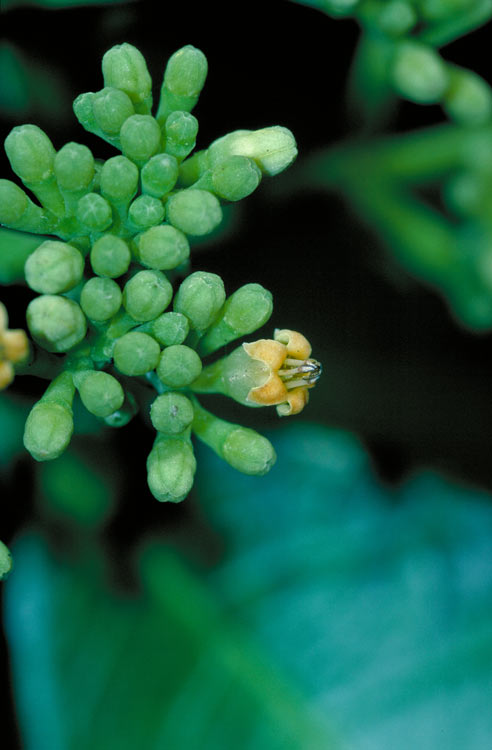
Inflorescence

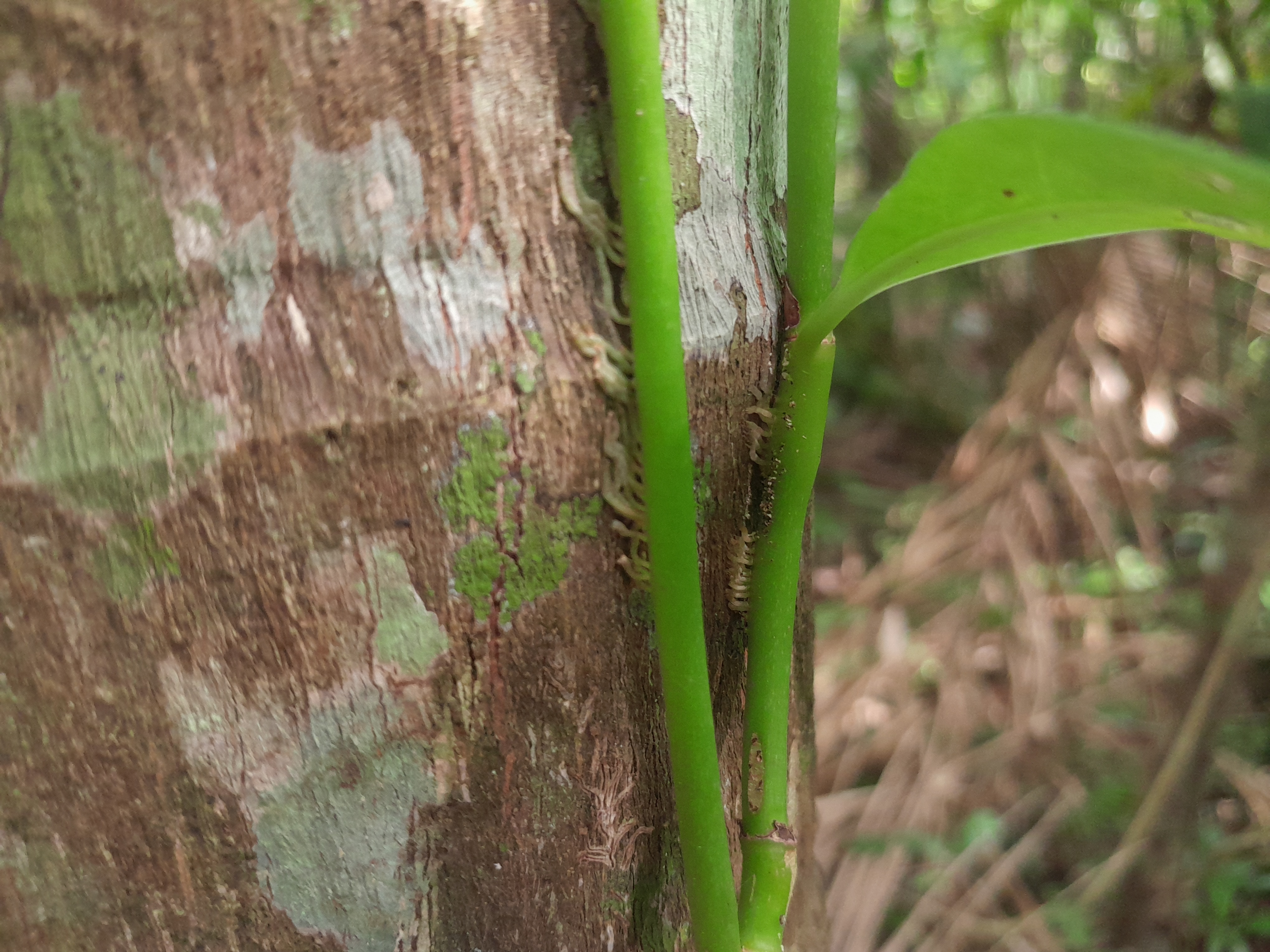
Rootlets
