= Psychotria hebecarpa =

Conservation status
- Least Concern (NCA)

Scientific classification
- Kingdom: Plantae
- Clade: Tracheophytes
- Clade: Angiosperms
- Clade: Eudicots
- Clade: Asterids
- Order: Gentianales
- Family: Rubiaceae
- Genus: Psychotria
- Species: P. hebecarpa

Binomial name
- Psychotria hebecarpa Merr. & L.M.Perry

Species of flowering plant

Psychotria hebecarpa is a species of flowering plant in the family Rubiaceae that is native to New Guinea and Queensland in Australia.

== Habitat & distribution ==
The species can be found in lowland rainforest, monsoonal forest and notophyll vineforest in New Guinea and Queensland, where it is only known to occur in Lockerbie Scrub on the far northern tip of the Cape York Peninsula.

== Description ==
It can grow as a sub-shrub, shrub or small tree to a height of 1.5 metres. The species has a perennial life cycle and is hermaphroditic. The species has an erect or prostrate growth habit. The inflorescence is shortly pedunculate with a length of 37 millimetres and 3 to 5 flower clusters. The species features fleshy, indehiscent and drupaceous fruit. The species is evergreen. The leaves have round to obtuse bases and acute apices. The length of the leaves is 200 millimetres and the width of the leaves is 75 millimetres.

== Conservation ==
Under the Nature Conservation Act 1992 in Queensland it has been classified as Least Concern.
