= Thomas Robertson Sim =

South African botanist (1858–1938)

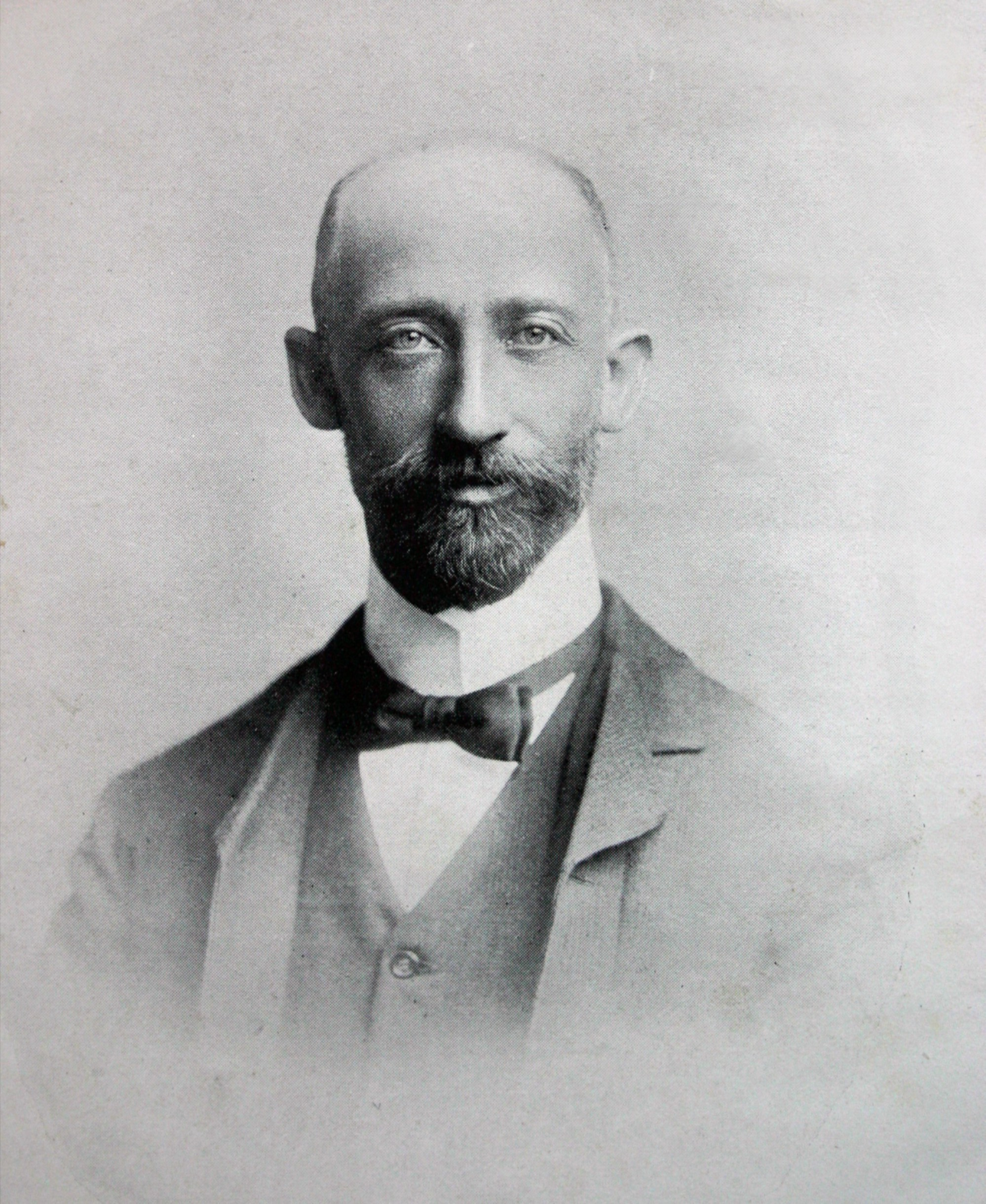

Thomas Robertson Sim (25 June 1858 in Northfield, Aberdeen, Scotland – 23 July 1938 in Durban, Natal) was a botanist, bryologist, botanical artist and Conservator of Forests in Natal, best known for his monumental work The Forests and Forest Flora of the Colony of the Cape of Good Hope which appeared in 1907. He was the eldest of five children of John Sim (1824–1901), a noted bryologist and Isabella Thomson Robertson (1823-).

== Education and career ==
Attended Old Aberdeen grammar school until 1873 and in 1874 was given special tuition at Marischal College, University of Aberdeen. In that same year he served as apprentice gardener in the Royal Horticultural Society's gardens in Chiswick. In 1878 he was appointed to the Royal Botanic Gardens at Kew where he received a training in botany under Sir Joseph Dalton Hooker. In 1879 he worked for a year in the Harvard University botanic gardens in Cambridge, Massachusetts. Here he was influenced by Asa Gray and George Lincoln Goodale. Subsequently, he worked for a year in the garden of Colonel Peabody of Milton, Massachusetts. Returning to Scotland in 1881, he assisted his father on the farm at Inchmark from 1884–1888.

In 1889 he took up the post of curator of the King William's Town botanical garden. In September 1894 he became a Government Forester with the Cape Forestry Department and started work at Fort Cunynghame Plantation near Döhne. Within a few months he was promoted to Superintendent of Plantations in the Eastern Conservancy, and by 1898 to District Forest Officer with headquarters at King William's Town.

In 1902 he established a forest department in Natal, and became its first Conservator of Forests in 1903, with headquarters in Pietermaritzburg. In 1907 he travelled to London as representative of the South African Products Exhibition. In 1908 he was asked to visit Portuguese East Africa and later wrote a report on forest utilisation, which appeared as Forest Flora and Forest Resources of Portuguese East Africa, which was lavishly illustrated with his own line drawings.

In 1908 he ventured into the commercial world by setting up a nursery in Pietermaritzburg, and advising on tree planting and large-scale afforestation, also venturing into the timber and wattle-growing industries, being a founder member of the Wattle Growers' Association and Cedara College of Agriculture.

He was elected F.L.S., F.R.H.S. and F.R.S.S.Afr. and in 1919 received an honorary D.Sc. from the University of South Africa. He was also a constant supporter of the S.Afr.Assoc. for the Adv. of Science, contributing regularly to their journal. Attending one of their meetings in Rhodesia in 1920, he suffered stroke which left him partially paralysed, but despite the handicap, continued with his work. He relinquished all his business interests and devoted all his time to finishing his opus magnum, a comprehensive study of trees in Southern Africa up to the Zambesi and Cunene Rivers. Death intervened and the unfinished manuscript is still kept at the National Botanical Research Institute in Pretoria, which also houses his library.

Sim is commemorated in Simia, a genus of liverworts and numerous specific names.

Thomas Robertson Sim should not be confused with the agronomist James Taylor Robertson Sim (1903–1968), who was the son of TR Sim's brother, James Sim, also for many years a forestry officer.

This botanist is denoted by the author abbreviation Sim when citing a botanical name.

== Publications ==
- Handbook of the Ferns of Kaffraria (Aberdeen 1891)
- The Ferns of South Africa (Cape Town 1892)
- Sketch and Checklist of the Flora of Kaffraria (Cape Town 1894)
- Botanical Observations on the Forests of Eastern Pondoland
- Recent Information concerning South African Ferns and their distribution (1906)
- The Forests and Forest Flora of the Colony of the Cape of Good Hope (Taylor & Henderson, Aberdeen 1907)
- Forest Flora and Forest Resources of Portuguese East Africa (Aberdeen 1909)
- The Ferns of South Africa (enlarged 2nd edition) (Cambridge 1915)
- Handbook of the Bryophyta of South Africa (1916)
- Flowering Trees and Shrubs for use in South Africa (Dept of Mines & Industries Mem No.3 Pretoria 1921)
- The Bryophyta of South Africa (Trans. Roy. Soc. S.Afr. 1926)
- Tree-planting in South Africa (Pietermaritzburg 1927)
- Tree-planting in Natal

== Sources ==
- Botanical Exploration of Southern Africa Mary Gunn & LE Codd (Balkema 1981)
