= Psychotridine =

Chemical compound

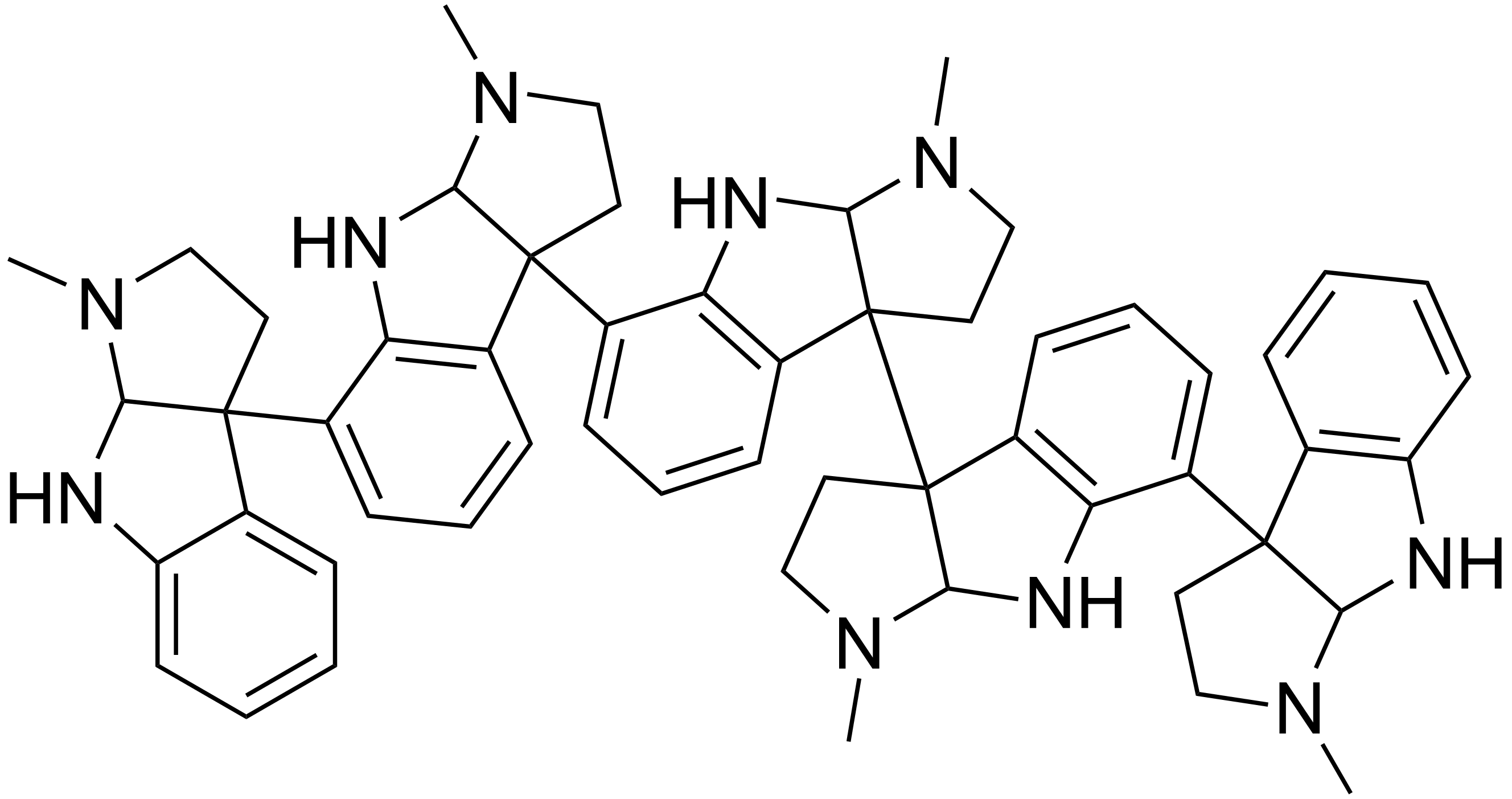

Clinical data
- ATC code: none

Identifiers
- IUPAC name: 3-methyl-5,8b-bis[3-methyl-5-(3-methyl-1,2,3a,4-tetrahydropyrrolo[2,3-b]indol-8b-yl)-1,2,3a,4-tetrahydropyrrolo[2,3-b]indol-8b-yl]-1,2,3a,4-tetrahydropyrrolo[2,3-b]indole
- CAS Number: 52617-25-1
- PubChem CID: 171175
- ChemSpider: 149650
- CompTox Dashboard (EPA): DTXSID501046292

Chemical and physical data
- Formula: C_{55}H_{62}N_{10}
- Molar mass: 863.171 g·mol^{−1}
- 3D model (JSmol): Interactive image
- SMILES: CN1CCC2(C1NC1=CC=CC=C21)C1=CC=CC2=C1NC1N(C)CCC21C1=CC=CC2=C1NC1N(C)CCC21C12CCN(C)C1NC1=C2C=CC=C1C12CCN(C)C1NC1=CC=CC=C21

Psychotridine is an alkaloid found in some species of the genus Psychotria, namely Psychotria colorata, but also Psychotria forsteriana, Psychotria lyciiflora, Psychotria oleoides, and Psychotria beccarioides. Psychotridine has analgesic effects and dose-dependently inhibits dizocilpine binding to cortical membranes in vitro, suggesting that it acts as a non-competitive NMDA receptor antagonist.

== See also ==
- Hodgkinsine
