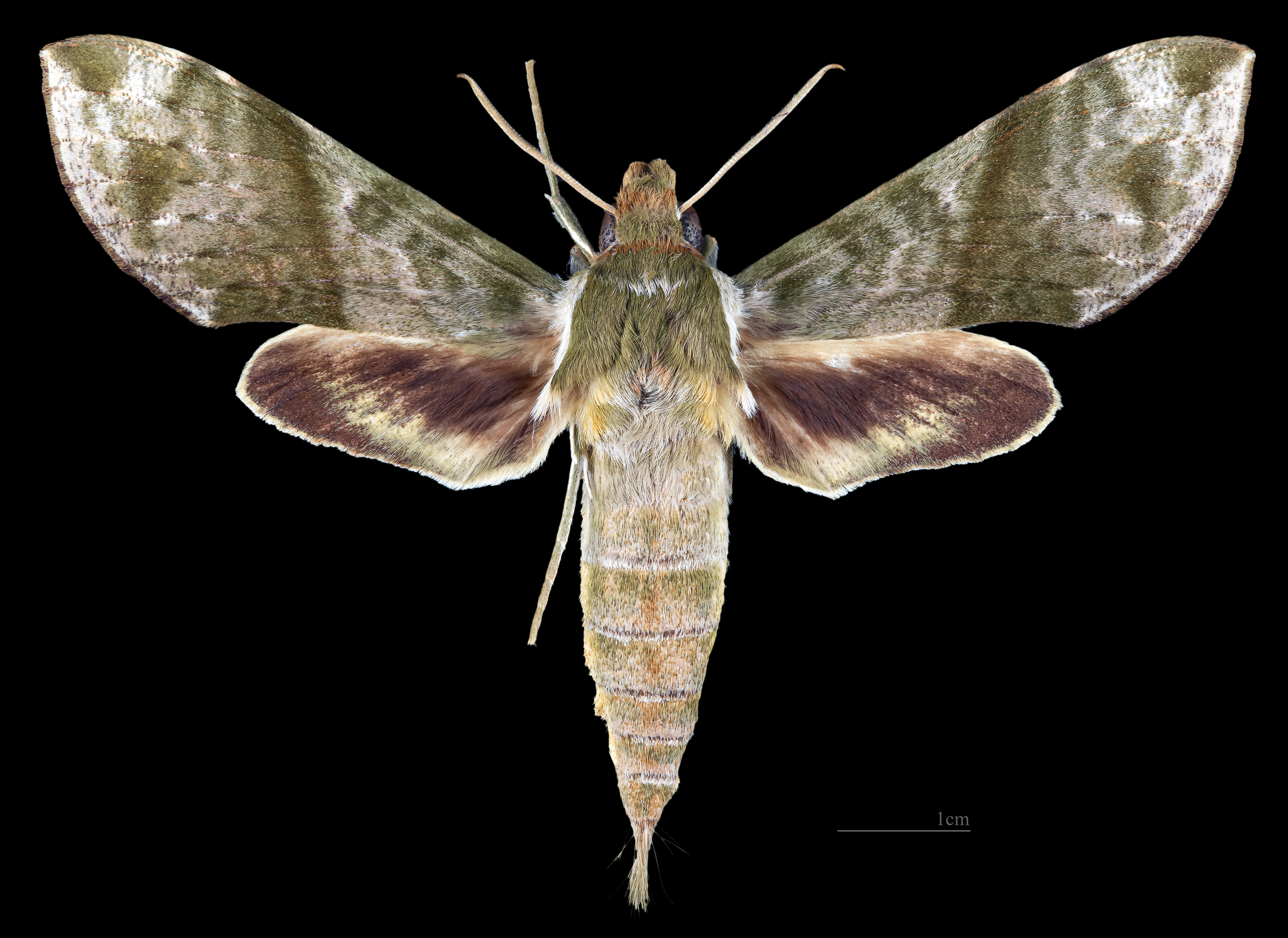

Scientific classification
- Domain: Eukaryota
- Kingdom: Animalia
- Phylum: Arthropoda
- Class: Insecta
- Order: Lepidoptera
- Family: Sphingidae
- Genus: Xylophanes
- Species: X. pistacina

Binomial name
- Xylophanes pistacina (Boisduval, 1875)

Synonyms
- Choerocampa pistacina Boisduval, 1875; Choerocampa jocasta Druce, 1888; Calliomma diogenes Maassen, 1880

= Xylophanes pistacina =

Species of moth

Xylophanes pistacina is a moth of the family Sphingidae. It is found from Nicaragua south to Brazil and west to Bolivia, Paraguay and Argentina.

The wingspan is 75–87 mm. The upperside of the abdomen has no lines. The ground colour is generally greenish-buff, although some individuals are much greener. The subbasal and antemedian lines are vestigial, the two distal lines forming a band at the apex of the discal cell. The two proximal postmedian lines are more or less merged to form a band, the inner of which is often straight. The third postmedian line is very faint and the fourth is more distinct and emphasized by vein dots. Postmedian lines two to four are dentate and postmedian line five is curved from the wing apex and continuous with a greenish olive patch. The brown border is broad. The pale band is highly suffused with olive-brown.

Adults are probably on wing year-round in Costa Rica.

The larvae possibly feed on Psychotria species.
