= Hodgkinsine =

Chemical compound

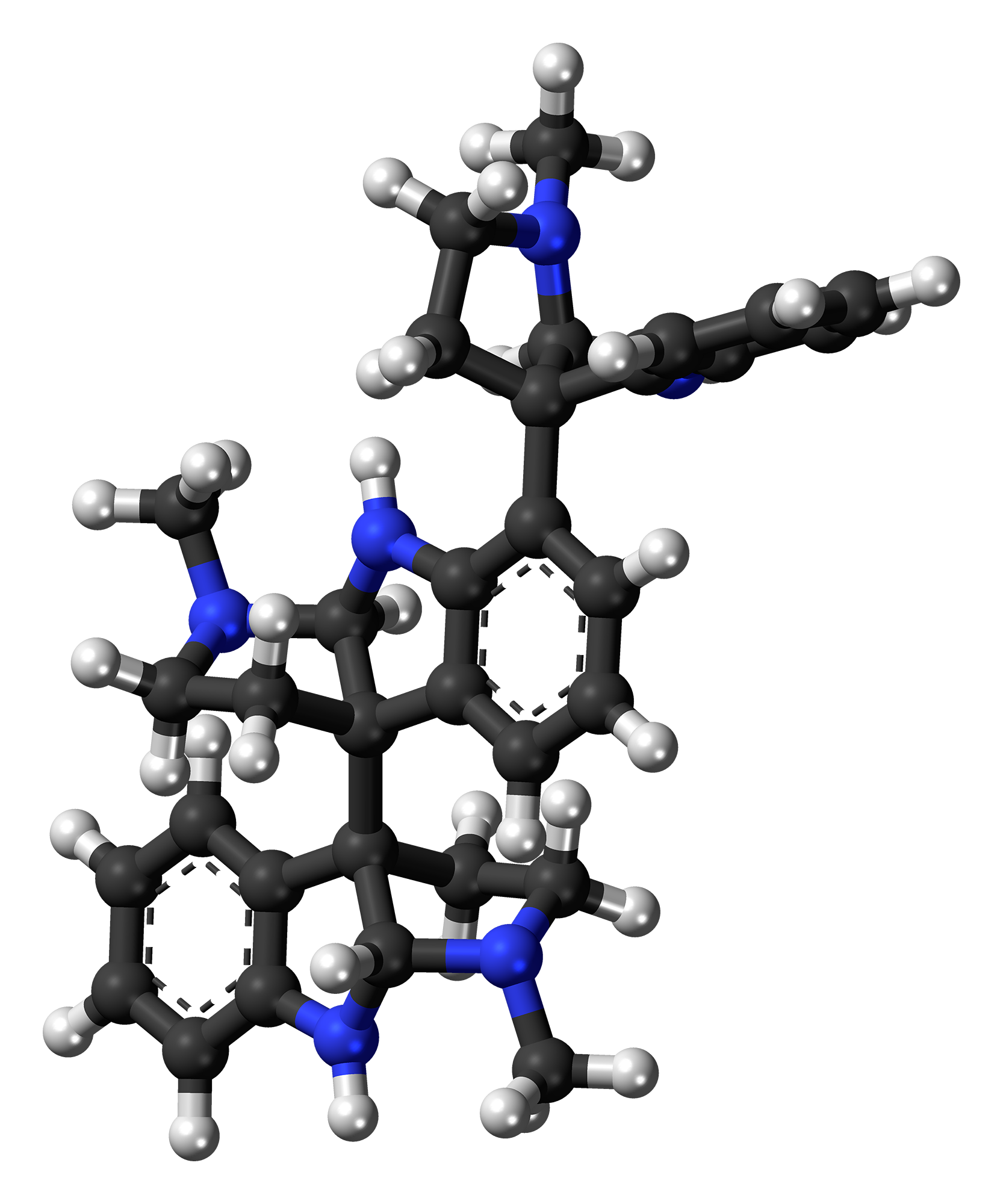

Clinical data
- ATC code: none

Identifiers
- IUPAC name: (3aR,8bR)-5,8b-bis[(3aR,8bR)-3-methyl-1,2,3a,4-tetrahydropyrrolo[2,3-b]indol-8b-yl]-3- methyl-1,2,3a,4-tetrahydropyrrolo[2,3-b]indole
- CAS Number: 18210-71-4
- PubChem CID: 442105
- ChemSpider: none
- CompTox Dashboard (EPA): DTXSID60939524

Chemical and physical data
- Formula: C_{33}H_{38}N_{6}
- Molar mass: 518.709 g·mol^{−1}
- 3D model (JSmol): Interactive image
- SMILES: CN1CC[C@]2([C@@H]1NC3=CC=CC=C32)C4=C5C(=CC=C4)[C@]6(CCN([C@H]6N5)C)[C@@]78CCN([C@@H]7NC9=CC=CC=C89)C

Hodgkinsine is an alkaloid found in plants of the genus Psychotria, particularly Psychotria colorata, although it is also found in Psychotria lyciiflora and probably other species in this family,

Hodgkinsine has antiviral, antibacterial and antifungal effects, but has mainly been researched for the analgesic effects that it produces, and is thought to be one of the components responsible for the analgesic effects seen when Psychotria colorata is used in traditional medical practice in humans. It has been found to act as both a mu opioid agonist and an NMDA antagonist, both of which are mechanisms of action shared with commonly used painkillers (morphine and ketamine respectively, and which occur concurrently in the clinical analgesics methadone and levorphanol).

Hodgkinsine is a trimer composed of three pyrrolidinoindoline subunits, with the monomer closely resembling another alkaloid eseroline which has similar bioactivity. Due to its complex structure and multiple chiral centres, hodgkinsine has many stereoisomers and significant research has been undertaken to elucidate the structure-activity relationships of the various isomers and synthetic derivatives structurally derived from hodgkinsine.

== See also ==
- Psychotridine
