= P. gardneri =

P. gardneri may refer to:

- Proechimys gardneri, the Gardner's spiny-rat, a rat species from South America
- Psychotria gardneri, a plant species endemic to Sri Lanka

== See also ==
- Gardneri
