= Psychotria sordida =

Conservation status
- Endangered (IUCN 2.3)

Scientific classification
- Kingdom: Plantae
- Clade: Tracheophytes
- Clade: Angiosperms
- Clade: Eudicots
- Clade: Asterids
- Order: Gentianales
- Family: Rubiaceae
- Genus: Psychotria
- Species: P. sordida

Binomial name
- Psychotria sordida Thwaites

Species of plant

Psychotria sordida is a species of plant in the family Rubiaceae. It is endemic to Sri Lanka.

== Trunk ==
Branchlets slender.
