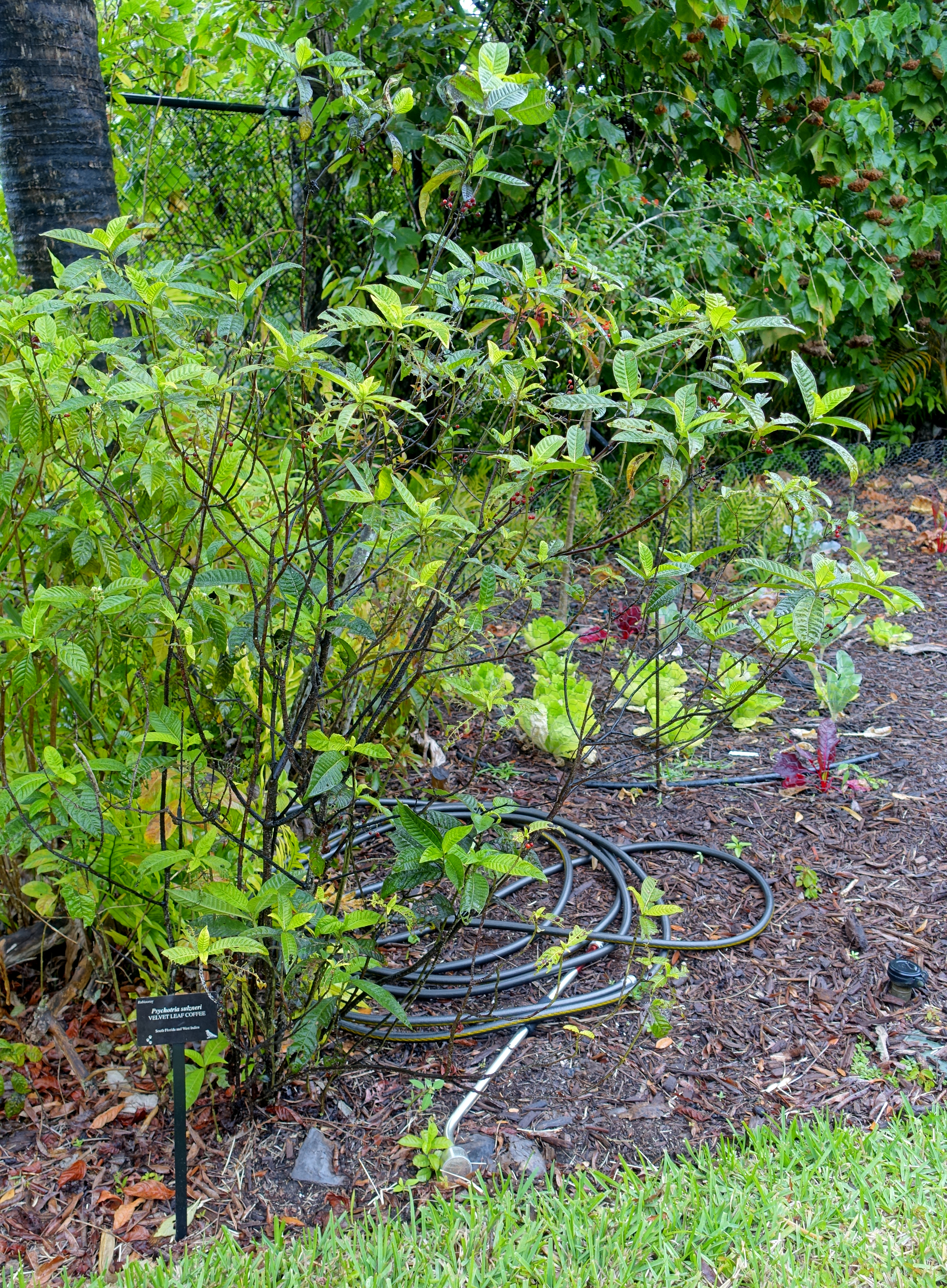

Scientific classification
- Kingdom: Plantae
- Clade: Tracheophytes
- Clade: Angiosperms
- Clade: Eudicots
- Clade: Asterids
- Order: Gentianales
- Family: Rubiaceae
- Genus: Psychotria
- Species: P. tenuifolia

Binomial name
- Psychotria tenuifolia Sw. (1788)

Synonyms
- Psychotria sulzneri

= Psychotria tenuifolia =

Species of flowering plant

Psychotria tenuifolia, commonly known as velvet-leaved wild coffee, is a species of plant in the family Rubiaceae. It is native to southern Florida, South America and the Caribbean. The description of velvet is based on the silky appearance that the leaves display in relation to other species of the same plant family.

== Description ==
The species’ growth habit is known to be an evergreen shrub, or small tree. Some features that can be used to describe Psychotria tenuifolia would be dull or blue-green leaves which are about 4–7 in (100–180 mm) long. The leaves are opposite and simple, which means that leaves form with a single stipule between them and has pinnate venation. It contains terminal inflorescence, an inflorescence that arises from the end of the stem rather than the leaf base and has no domatia present, as opposed to other Psychotria species. The flowers when bloomed are small and white in clusters, and have 5 petals with radial symmetry. Its fruits are red, orange, or yellow consisting of thin skin and a central seed. This species is known to be heterostylic, each flower containing different lengths of stamen reducing self-fertilization. It is also hermaphroditic containing both female and male parts within one flower.

== Ecology ==
Psychotria tenuifolia grows in regions that are usually moist and can be found in locations where the other large plants provide shade for it. It is native to tropical and subtropical moist areas such as Florida, Puerto Rico, Nicaragua, Cuba, Brazil, as well as the Caribbean. The soil that it propagates and thrives in has to have a pH that is acidic, or preferably in alkaline. Hardiness zones in which it grows in is 10A, 10B, 11, 9A, and 9B. The type of soil they found in are usually moist, well-drained sandy or limestone soils. Its seeds are dispersed by birds such as mockingbirds, and it is assumed to be pollinated by insects and hummingbirds.

== Cultivation and medicinal uses ==
Although the plant family is most commonly used for its coffee seeds, this species in particular is used for the advantages that the plant provides medically. Psychotria tenuifolia was traditionally used in the Caribbean as a home remedy to treat colds, fevers, stomach sickness, asthma, and other conditions such as swelling, sores, tumors, and skin fungus. Other sources mention that the species can be used to stop hemorrhaging
