= Psychotria petitii =

Conservation status
- Endangered (IUCN 3.1)

Scientific classification
- Kingdom: Plantae
- Clade: Tracheophytes
- Clade: Angiosperms
- Clade: Eudicots
- Clade: Asterids
- Order: Gentianales
- Family: Rubiaceae
- Genus: Psychotria
- Species: P. petitii

Binomial name
- Psychotria petitii Verdc.

Species of plant

Psychotria petitii is a species of plant in the family Rubiaceae. It is an endangered species endemic to Taita Hills in Kenya.

== Distribution and habitat ==
Psychotria petitii is restricted to the Taita Hills in southern Kenya, where it grows in moist evergreen forests at altitudes of 1,400–1,850 m (4,590–6,070 ft) above sea level.
