= Psychotria densinervia =

Conservation status
- Endangered (IUCN 3.1)

Scientific classification
- Kingdom: Plantae
- Clade: Tracheophytes
- Clade: Angiosperms
- Clade: Eudicots
- Clade: Asterids
- Order: Gentianales
- Family: Rubiaceae
- Genus: Psychotria
- Species: P. densinervia

Binomial name
- Psychotria densinervia (K.Krause) Verdc.

Synonyms
- Camptopus densinervius K.Krause; Cephaelis densinervia (K.Krause) Hepper

Species of plant

Psychotria densinervia is a species of flowering plant in the family Rubiaceae. It is endemic to Cameroon. Its natural habitat is subtropical or tropical moist lowland forests. It is threatened by habitat loss.
