= Psychotria plurivenia =

Conservation status
- Endangered (IUCN 2.3)

Scientific classification
- Kingdom: Plantae
- Clade: Tracheophytes
- Clade: Angiosperms
- Clade: Eudicots
- Clade: Asterids
- Order: Gentianales
- Family: Rubiaceae
- Genus: Psychotria
- Species: P. plurivenia

Binomial name
- Psychotria plurivenia Thwaites

Species of plant

Psychotria plurivenia is a species of plant in the family Rubiaceae. It is endemic to Sri Lanka.
