= Psychotria greenwelliae =

Conservation status
- Endangered (IUCN 3.1)

Scientific classification
- Kingdom: Plantae
- Clade: Tracheophytes
- Clade: Angiosperms
- Clade: Eudicots
- Clade: Asterids
- Order: Gentianales
- Family: Rubiaceae
- Genus: Psychotria
- Species: P. greenwelliae

Binomial name
- Psychotria greenwelliae Fosberg

Species of plant

Psychotria greenwelliae, the Kauai wild coffee, is a species of plant in the family Rubiaceae. It is endemic to the islands of Kauai and Oahu in Hawaii. It is threatened by habitat loss.
