= Psychotria dura =

Scientific classification
- Kingdom: Plantae
- Clade: Tracheophytes
- Clade: Angiosperms
- Clade: Eudicots
- Clade: Asterids
- Order: Gentianales
- Family: Rubiaceae
- Genus: Psychotria
- Species: P. dura

Binomial name
- Psychotria dura Griseb.

Synonyms
- Psychotria danceri Urb.; Psychotria jenmanii Urb.; Psychotria troyana Urb.; Uragoga dura (Griseb.) Kuntze

Species of plant

Psychotria dura is a species of flowering plant in the family Rubiaceae. It is endemic to Jamaica.
