= Psychotria marchionica =

Scientific classification
- Kingdom: Plantae
- Clade: Tracheophytes
- Clade: Angiosperms
- Clade: Eudicots
- Clade: Asterids
- Order: Gentianales
- Family: Rubiaceae
- Genus: Psychotria
- Species: P. marchionica

Binomial name
- Psychotria marchionica Drake (1890)

Synonyms
- Psychotria lebronnecii Fosberg (1939); Uragoga marchionica (Drake) Drake (1892)

Species of plant

Psychotria marchionica is a species of flowering plant in the family Rubiaceae. It is endemic to the Marquesas Islands.
