= Psychotria hobdyi =

Conservation status
- Critically Endangered (IUCN 3.1)

Scientific classification
- Kingdom: Plantae
- Clade: Tracheophytes
- Clade: Angiosperms
- Clade: Eudicots
- Clade: Asterids
- Order: Gentianales
- Family: Rubiaceae
- Genus: Psychotria
- Species: P. hobdyi

Binomial name
- Psychotria hobdyi Sohmer

Species of plant

Psychotria hobdyi, the milolii kopiwai, Hobdy's wild-coffee or kopiko, is a species of plant in the family Rubiaceae. It is endemic to the Hawaiian Islands, where it is known only from the island of Kauai. There are about 10 populations for a total of about 120 individuals. It is threatened by habitat loss and was federally listed as an endangered species of the United States in 2010.
