= Psychotria guerkeana =

Conservation status
- Vulnerable (IUCN 2.3)

Scientific classification
- Kingdom: Plantae
- Clade: Tracheophytes
- Clade: Angiosperms
- Clade: Eudicots
- Clade: Asterids
- Order: Gentianales
- Family: Rubiaceae
- Genus: Psychotria
- Species: P. guerkeana

Binomial name
- Psychotria guerkeana K. Schum. (1892)

Species of plant

Psychotria guerkeana is a species of plant in the family Rubiaceae. It is endemic to São Tomé Island and is listed as vulnerable by the IUCN. It was named and described by Karl Moritz Schumann.
