= Psychotria rostrata =

Scientific classification
- Kingdom: Plantae
- Clade: Tracheophytes
- Clade: Angiosperms
- Clade: Eudicots
- Clade: Asterids
- Order: Gentianales
- Family: Rubiaceae
- Genus: Psychotria
- Species: P. rostrata

Binomial name
- Psychotria rostrata Blume

Species of plant

Psychotria rostrata is a South American rainforest understory shrub from the coffee family, Rubiaceae.
