= Psychotria tahitensis =

Conservation status
- Least Concern (IUCN 3.1)

Scientific classification
- Kingdom: Plantae
- Clade: Tracheophytes
- Clade: Angiosperms
- Clade: Eudicots
- Clade: Asterids
- Order: Gentianales
- Family: Rubiaceae
- Genus: Psychotria
- Species: P. tahitensis

Binomial name
- Psychotria tahitensis (Drake) Drake (1890)

Synonyms
- Uragoga tahitensis Drake (1886)

Species of plant

Psychotria tahitensis is a species of flowering plant in the family Rubiaceae. It is a shrub or tree endemic to the island of Tahiti in the Society Islands of French Polynesia.
