= Psychotria chalconeura =

Conservation status
- Least Concern (IUCN 3.1)

Scientific classification
- Kingdom: Plantae
- Clade: Tracheophytes
- Clade: Angiosperms
- Clade: Eudicots
- Clade: Asterids
- Order: Gentianales
- Family: Rubiaceae
- Genus: Psychotria
- Species: P. chalconeura

Binomial name
- Psychotria chalconeura (K.Schum.) E.M.A.Petit

Species of plant

Psychotria chalconeura is a species of plant in the family Rubiaceae. It is found in Cameroon and the Democratic Republic of the Congo. Its natural habitat is subtropical or tropical moist lowland forests.
