= Psychotria grumilia =

Conservation status
- Vulnerable (IUCN 2.3)

Scientific classification
- Kingdom: Plantae
- Clade: Tracheophytes
- Clade: Angiosperms
- Clade: Eudicots
- Clade: Asterids
- Order: Gentianales
- Family: Rubiaceae
- Genus: Psychotria
- Species: P. grumilia

Binomial name
- Psychotria grumilia (Kuntze) E.M.A.Petit

Synonyms
- Grumilea macrocarpa Hiern; Psychotria hierniana Exell, nom. illeg. superfl.; Uragoga grumilia Kuntze

Species of plant

Psychotria grumilia (synonym Psychotria hierniana) is a species of plant in the family Rubiaceae. It is a tree endemic to São Tomé Island.
