= Psychotria speciosa =

Conservation status
- Endangered (IUCN 3.1)

Scientific classification
- Kingdom: Plantae
- Clade: Tracheophytes
- Clade: Angiosperms
- Clade: Eudicots
- Clade: Asterids
- Order: Gentianales
- Family: Rubiaceae
- Genus: Psychotria
- Species: P. speciosa

Binomial name
- Psychotria speciosa G.Forst. (1786)

Synonyms
- Cephaelis speciosa (G.Forst.) Spreng. (1824); Uragoga speciosa (G.Forst.) Drake (1886)

Species of plant

Psychotria speciosa is a species of flowering plant in the family Rubiaceae. It is a shrub or tree endemic to the island of Tahiti in the Society Islands of French Polynesia.
