= Psychotria atricaulis =

Conservation status
- Vulnerable (IUCN 3.1)

Scientific classification
- Kingdom: Plantae
- Clade: Embryophytes
- Clade: Tracheophytes
- Clade: Angiosperms
- Clade: Eudicots
- Clade: Asterids
- Order: Gentianales
- Family: Rubiaceae
- Genus: Psychotria
- Species: P. atricaulis

Binomial name
- Psychotria atricaulis Fosberg (1983)

Species of plant

Psychotria atricaulis is a species of plant in the family Rubiaceae. It is a shrub endemic to the island of Huahine in the Society Islands of French Polynesia. It grows in lowland tropical moist forest.
