= Psychotria srilankensis =

Scientific classification
- Kingdom: Plantae
- Clade: Tracheophytes
- Clade: Angiosperms
- Clade: Eudicots
- Clade: Asterids
- Order: Gentianales
- Family: Rubiaceae
- Genus: Psychotria
- Species: P. srilankensis

Binomial name
- Psychotria srilankensis Ruhsam

Synonyms
- Grumilea stenophylla Thwaites; Psychotria stenophylla (Thwaites) Hook.f.; Uragoga zeylanica Kuntze

Species of plant

Psychotria srilankensis is a species of flowering plant in the family Rubiaceae. It is endemic to Sri Lanka.
