= Psychotria carronis =

Scientific classification
- Kingdom: Plantae
- Clade: Tracheophytes
- Clade: Angiosperms
- Clade: Eudicots
- Clade: Asterids
- Order: Gentianales
- Family: Rubiaceae
- Genus: Psychotria
- Species: P. carronis

Binomial name
- Psychotria carronis C.Moore & F.Muell. (1869)

Species of plant

Psychotria carronis, commonly known as the black grape, is a flowering plant in the coffee family. The specific epithet honours William Carron (1823–1876) who collected plants on Lord Howe Island for the Royal Botanic Gardens, Sydney.

== Description ==
It is a small tree growing to 8 m in height. The stems exhibit prominent ring-like leaf scars. The dark glossy green, oblong-oblanceolate leaves are 80–160 mm long, 30–50 mm wide. The white flowers, 6–8 mm long, occur in cymose inflorescences from November to March. The shiny, fleshy, black fruits are 18–20 mm long and are produced in loose clusters.

== Distribution and habitat ==
The species is endemic to Australia’s subtropical Lord Howe Island in the Tasman Sea. It occurs in sheltered forest, mainly at elevations of 100–400 m, around Mounts Lidgbird and Gower at the southern end of the island.
