= Psychotria deverdiana =

Conservation status
- Vulnerable (IUCN 3.1)

Scientific classification
- Kingdom: Plantae
- Clade: Tracheophytes
- Clade: Angiosperms
- Clade: Eudicots
- Clade: Asterids
- Order: Gentianales
- Family: Rubiaceae
- Genus: Psychotria
- Species: P. deverdiana

Binomial name
- Psychotria deverdiana Guillaumin

Species of plant

Psychotria deverdiana is a species of plant in the family Rubiaceae. It is endemic to New Caledonia.
