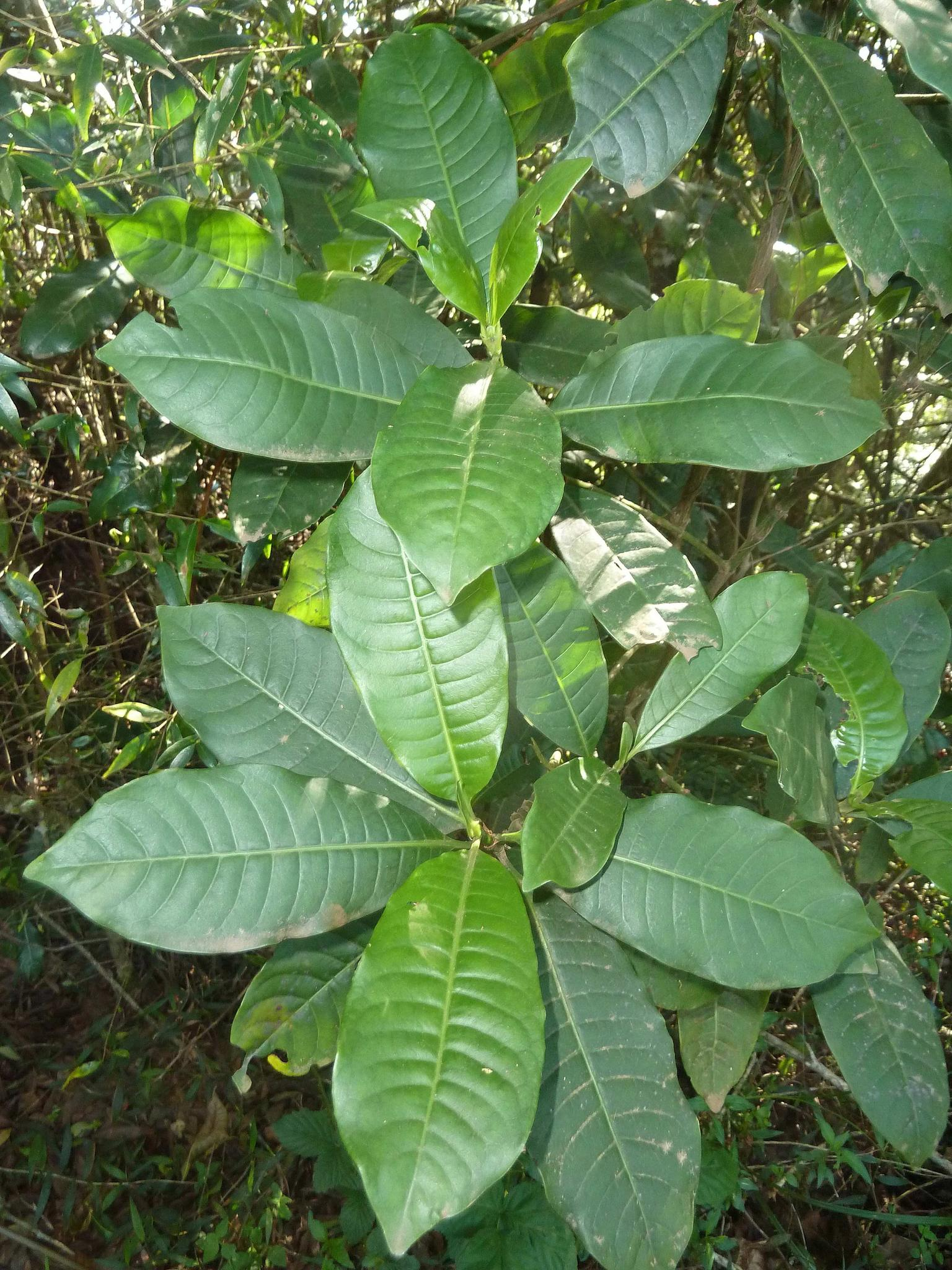
- In Ehlanzeni, South Africa

Conservation status
- Near Threatened (IUCN 2.3)

Scientific classification
- Kingdom: Plantae
- Clade: Tracheophytes
- Clade: Angiosperms
- Clade: Eudicots
- Clade: Asterids
- Order: Gentianales
- Family: Rubiaceae
- Genus: Psychotria
- Species: P. zombamontana

Binomial name
- Psychotria zombamontana (Kuntze) Petit

= Psychotria zombamontana =

Species of plant

Psychotria zombamontana is a species of plant in the family Rubiaceae. It is found in South Africa, Tanzania and Zimbabwe.

== Description ==
P. zombamontana is a shrub or small tree with hairless leaves that are opposite each other, oblanceolate, obovate to elliptic, and can grow up to 15 cm (5.9 in) long. The leaves have relatively parallel lateral veins that are slightly sunken above, and without any domatia. Its flowers grow in branching auxiliary inflorescences and are small, white to pale-creamy-yellow in color. The round fruit is around 6 mm long and slightly ribbed with a yellow to orange-red hue when ripe.

== Habitat ==
Psychotria zombamontane occurs from Tanzania south through South Africa; typically in the understorey of evergreen forests and along the forests' edge. It is one of the primary pioneer species of secondary montane forests and may be abundantly plentiful in the understorey. The species is most commonly found at altitudes between 1,000 m (3,300 ft) and 2,500 m (8,200 ft) above sea level.
