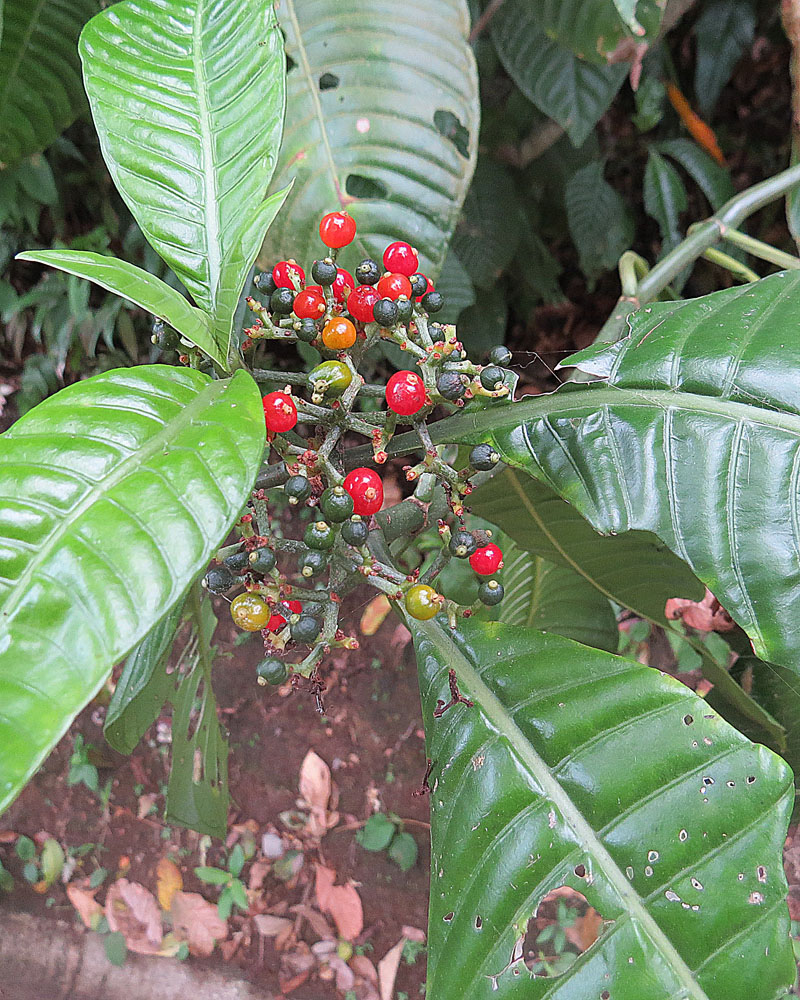

Scientific classification
- Kingdom: Plantae
- Clade: Tracheophytes
- Clade: Angiosperms
- Clade: Eudicots
- Clade: Asterids
- Order: Gentianales
- Family: Rubiaceae
- Genus: Psychotria
- Species: P. marginata

Binomial name
- Psychotria marginata Sw.

Synonyms
- Myrstiphyllum marginatum (Sw.) Hitchc. (1893); Uragoga marginata (Sw.) Kuntze (1891); Psychotria nicaraguensis Benth. (1853); Uragoga nicaraguensis (Benth.) Kuntze (1891)

= Psychotria marginata =

Species of plant

Psychotria marginata is a tropical shrub in the gardenia family (Rubiaceae) and native to Central America.

== Distribution and habitat ==
The species occurs from southern Mexico into tropical South America and grows primarily in wet biomes.

== Ecology ==
Leaves feature pits approximately 1 mm in width that offer habitat to aggressive mites which protect the leaves against other herbivorous species. Dry-season and wet-season leaves are superficially similar but have substantial physiological differences, as the former requires only half as much water to create sugar.
