= Psychotria adamsonii =

Conservation status
- Extinct (IUCN 2.3)

Scientific classification
- Kingdom: Plantae
- Clade: Embryophytes
- Clade: Tracheophytes
- Clade: Spermatophytes
- Clade: Angiosperms
- Clade: Eudicots
- Clade: Asterids
- Order: Gentianales
- Family: Rubiaceae
- Genus: Psychotria
- Species: †P. adamsonii

Binomial name
- †Psychotria adamsonii Fosberg (1939)

Species of plant

Psychotria adamsonii is a species of plant in the family Rubiaceae. It is a shrub or tree endemic to the island of Ua Pou in the Marquesas Islands of French Polynesia. It is thought to be extinct.

The epithet adamsonii commemorates Alastair Martin Adamson of the Pacific Entomological Survey.
