= Psychotria franchetiana =

Conservation status
- Critically Endangered (IUCN 3.1)

Scientific classification
- Kingdom: Plantae
- Clade: Embryophytes
- Clade: Tracheophytes
- Clade: Angiosperms
- Clade: Eudicots
- Clade: Asterids
- Order: Gentianales
- Family: Rubiaceae
- Genus: Psychotria
- Species: P. franchetiana

Binomial name
- Psychotria franchetiana (Drake) Drake (1890)

Synonyms
- Uragoga franchetiana Drake (1886)

Species of plant

Psychotria franchetiana is a species of flowering plant in the family Rubiaceae. It is a shrub endemic to the island of Tahiti in the Society Islands of French Polynesia.
