= Psychotria moseskemei =

Conservation status
- Critically Endangered (IUCN 3.1)

Scientific classification
- Kingdom: Plantae
- Clade: Tracheophytes
- Clade: Angiosperms
- Clade: Eudicots
- Clade: Asterids
- Order: Gentianales
- Family: Rubiaceae
- Genus: Psychotria
- Species: P. moseskemei

Binomial name
- Psychotria moseskemei Cheek

Species of plant

Psychotria moseskemei is a species of flowering plant in the family Rubiaceae. It is a tree native to Cameroon, Bioko, and Nigeria. It is threatened by habitat loss.
