= Psychotria grantii =

Conservation status
- Data Deficient (IUCN 3.1)

Scientific classification
- Kingdom: Plantae
- Clade: Tracheophytes
- Clade: Angiosperms
- Clade: Eudicots
- Clade: Asterids
- Order: Gentianales
- Family: Rubiaceae
- Genus: Psychotria
- Species: P. grantii

Binomial name
- Psychotria grantii Fosberg (1937)

Species of plant

Psychotria grantii is a species of plant in the family Rubiaceae. It is a shrub or tree endemic to the island of Tahiti in the Society Islands of French Polynesia.
