= Psychotria beddomei =

Conservation status
- Endangered (IUCN 2.3)

Scientific classification
- Kingdom: Plantae
- Clade: Tracheophytes
- Clade: Angiosperms
- Clade: Eudicots
- Clade: Asterids
- Order: Gentianales
- Family: Rubiaceae
- Genus: Psychotria
- Species: P. beddomei

Binomial name
- Psychotria beddomei Deb. & Gang.

Species of plant

Psychotria beddomei is a species of plant in the family Rubiaceae. It is endemic to Kerala in India.
