= Psychotria rufipilis =

Scientific classification
- Kingdom: Plantae
- Clade: Tracheophytes
- Clade: Angiosperms
- Clade: Eudicots
- Clade: Asterids
- Order: Gentianales
- Family: Rubiaceae
- Genus: Psychotria
- Species: P. rufipilis

Binomial name
- Psychotria rufipilis De Wild.

Synonyms
- Cephaelis konkourensis Schnell; Psychotria konkourensis Schnell; Psychotria nimbana Schnell; Psychotria nimbana var. djalonensis Schnell; Psychotria nimbana var. gaidensis Schnell; Psychotria nimbana f. vallicola Schnell; Psychotria psychotrioides (Schnell) Schnell; Psychotria rufipilis var. konkourensis Hepper; Psychotria rufopilis Chev. Uragoga psychotrioides Schnell

Species of plant

Psychotria rufipilis is an African rainforest understory shrub from the coffee family, Rubiaceae.
