= Psychotria fernandopoensis =

Conservation status
- Critically Endangered (IUCN 3.1)

Scientific classification
- Kingdom: Plantae
- Clade: Tracheophytes
- Clade: Angiosperms
- Clade: Eudicots
- Clade: Asterids
- Order: Gentianales
- Family: Rubiaceae
- Genus: Psychotria
- Species: P. fernandopoensis

Binomial name
- Psychotria fernandopoensis E.M.A.Petit

Synonyms
- Grumilea sphaerocarpa Hiern; Psychotria moliwensis Bridson & Cheek; Psychotria sphaerocarpa (Hiern) Hutch. & Dalziel; Uragoga sphaerocarpa (Hiern) Kuntze

Species of plant

Psychotria fernandopoensis is a species of flowering plant in the family Rubiaceae. It is a shrub native to Cameroon and the island of Bioko in Equatorial Guinea. Its natural habitat is tropical lowland rain forest. It is critically endangered and threatened by habitat loss.
