= Psychotria trichocalyx =

Conservation status
- Endangered (IUCN 3.1)

Scientific classification
- Kingdom: Plantae
- Clade: Tracheophytes
- Clade: Angiosperms
- Clade: Eudicots
- Clade: Asterids
- Order: Gentianales
- Family: Rubiaceae
- Genus: Psychotria
- Species: P. trichocalyx

Binomial name
- Psychotria trichocalyx (Drake) Fosberg ex J.-Y.Mey., Lorence & J.Florence

Synonyms
- Calycosia trichocalyx (Drake) Drake; Uragoga trichocalyx Drake

Species of plant

Psychotria trichocalyx is a species of flowering plant in the family Rubiaceae. It is a shrub or tree endemic to Mt. Marau in Tahiti, one of the Society Islands.
