= Psychotria cookei =

Conservation status
- Endangered (IUCN 3.1)

Scientific classification
- Kingdom: Plantae
- Clade: Embryophytes
- Clade: Tracheophytes
- Clade: Angiosperms
- Clade: Eudicots
- Clade: Asterids
- Order: Gentianales
- Family: Rubiaceae
- Genus: Psychotria
- Species: P. cookei

Binomial name
- Psychotria cookei J.W.Moore (1963)

Species of plant

Psychotria cookei is a species of flowering plant in the family Rubiaceae. It is a shrub endemic to the island of Raiatea in the Society Islands of French Polynesia.
