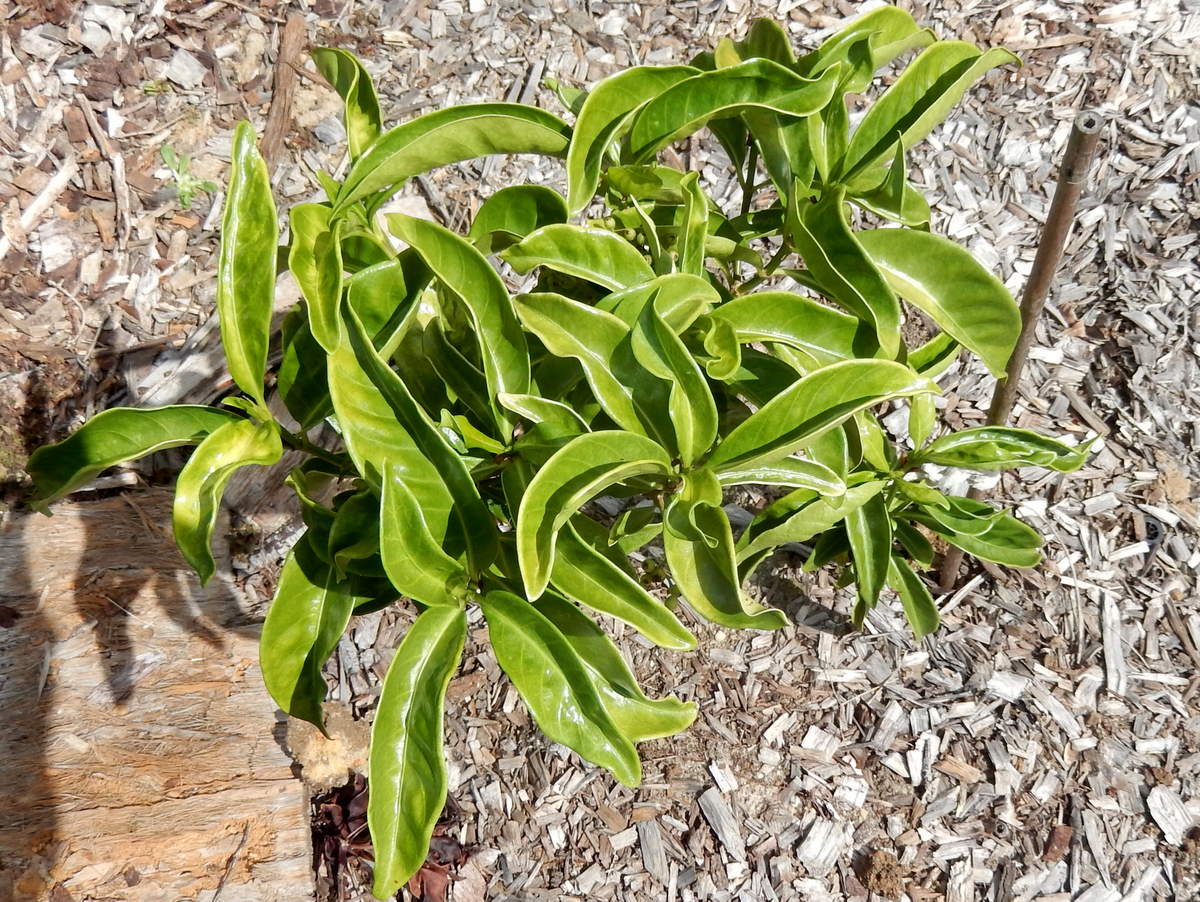

Scientific classification
- Kingdom: Plantae
- Clade: Tracheophytes
- Clade: Angiosperms
- Clade: Eudicots
- Clade: Asterids
- Order: Gentianales
- Family: Rubiaceae
- Genus: Psychotria
- Species: P. dallachiana

Binomial name
- Psychotria dallachiana Benth.

= Psychotria dallachiana =

Species of plant

Psychotria dallachiana is a rainforest plant growing in north eastern Australia. The fruit is food for the cassowary.
