= Psychotria crassipetala =

Conservation status
- Endangered (IUCN 3.1)

Scientific classification
- Kingdom: Plantae
- Clade: Tracheophytes
- Clade: Angiosperms
- Clade: Eudicots
- Clade: Asterids
- Order: Gentianales
- Family: Rubiaceae
- Genus: Psychotria
- Species: P. crassipetala

Binomial name
- Psychotria crassipetala Petit

Species of plant

Psychotria crassipetala is a species of plant in the family Rubiaceae. This species was firstly described by E. Petit in 1964 and believed endemic to Kenya for a long time, but recently found also in Tanzania.
