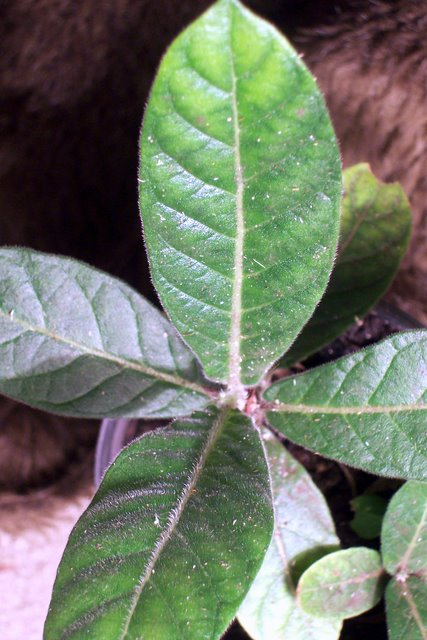
- leaves of Psychotria loniceroides

Conservation status
- Least Concern (NCA)

Scientific classification
- Kingdom: Plantae
- Clade: Tracheophytes
- Clade: Angiosperms
- Clade: Eudicots
- Clade: Asterids
- Order: Gentianales
- Family: Rubiaceae
- Genus: Psychotria
- Species: P. loniceroides

Binomial name
- Psychotria loniceroides Sieber ex DC.

Synonyms
- Myrstiphyllum loniceroides (Sieber ex DC.) Britten; Psychotria loniceroides var. typica Domin; Uragoga loniceroides (Sieber ex DC.) Kuntze; Psychotria loniceroides var. angustifolia Benth.

= Psychotria loniceroides =

Species of tree

Psychotria loniceroides, commonly known as hairy psychotria or Mapoon bush, is a species of plant in the coffee family Rubiaceae native to northern and eastern Australia. It is a shrub of drier rainforests and wet sclerophyll forests, and the fruit are eaten by birds. It was first described in 1830.

== Description ==
Psychotria loniceroides is a shrub growing to 2–5 metres in height and the branches, leaves and flowers are softly hairy. The leaves are ovate, elliptic or oblong and are up to 15 cm (5.9 in) long by 5 cm (2.0 in) wide.

Flowers are small and fragrant, about 5 mm (0.20 in) long and wide, with five white petals. They are followed by cream or pale yellow globular fruits up to 8 mm (0.31 in) diameter.

== Distribution and habitat ==
This species is present along the entire east coast of Australia, from near Bega in south eastern New South Wales to islands of the Torres Strait, Queensland. There is also a disjunct population in the Northern Territory. It grows as an understorey shrub in drier types of rainforest (such as monsoon forest and vine thickets), and in wet sclerophyll forests which form the transition from rainforest to eucalypt and other dry forests. In northern Australia, it is found at altitudes from sea level to 1,100 m (3,600 ft).

== Taxonomy ==
A description of this plant was first published in 1830 by Augustin Pyramus de Candolle, who attributed the description to botanist Franz Sieber.

=== Etymology ===
The generic name Psychotria is based on an earlier name, Psychotrophon, which was given to a plant reputed to have medicinal qualities. It is derived from Ancient Greek psyche meaning 'life' or 'soul', and the suffix -trophe meaning 'nourishment' or 'support'. The species epithet loniceroides is a reference to a perceived similarity between this species and plants in the genus Lonicera.

== Conservation ==
In Queensland this plant is listed as least concern, while in the Northern Territory it is considered to be near-threatened. As of January 2026, it has not been assessed by the IUCN.

== Ecology ==
Fruits are eaten by many species of birds. The larvae of the moth Macroglossum alcedo feed on the leaves of this plant.

== Uses ==
Ripe fruit are reported to be edible to humans, although they may irritate the throat. In his book Plants of Tropical North Queensland, John Beasley simply states, in reference to this plant, that "Some Psycotrias are poisonous."

== Gallery ==
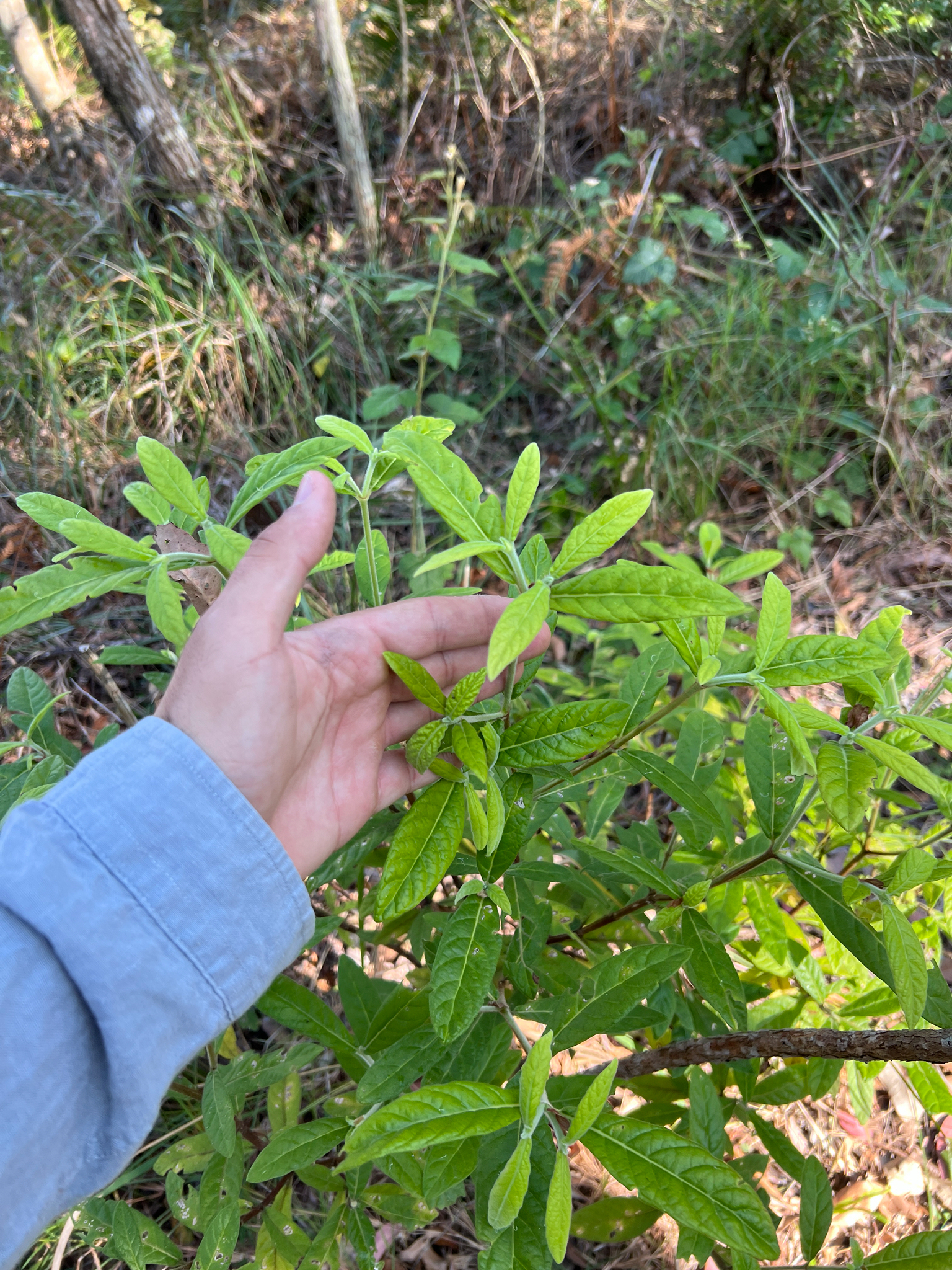
Habit

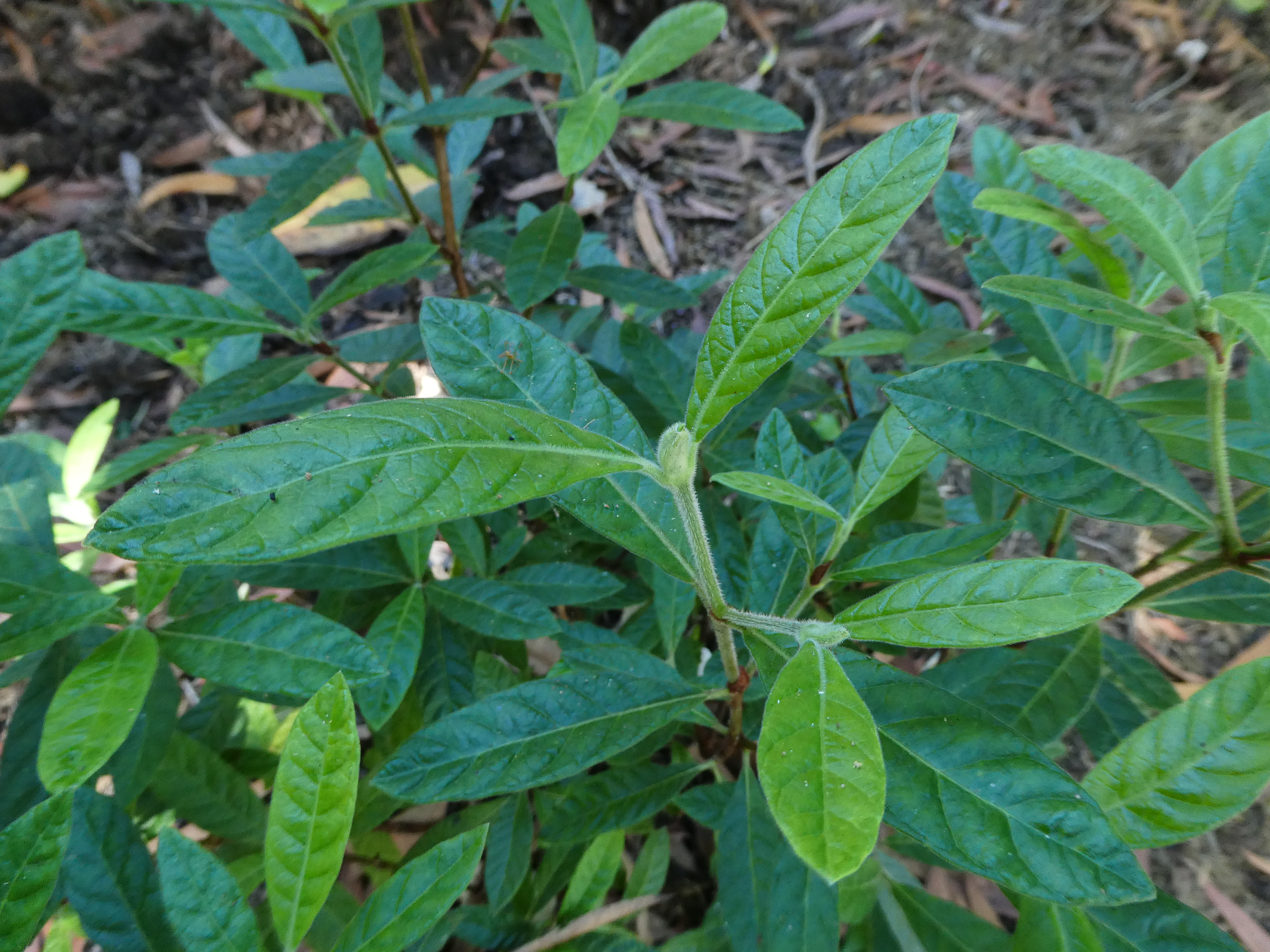

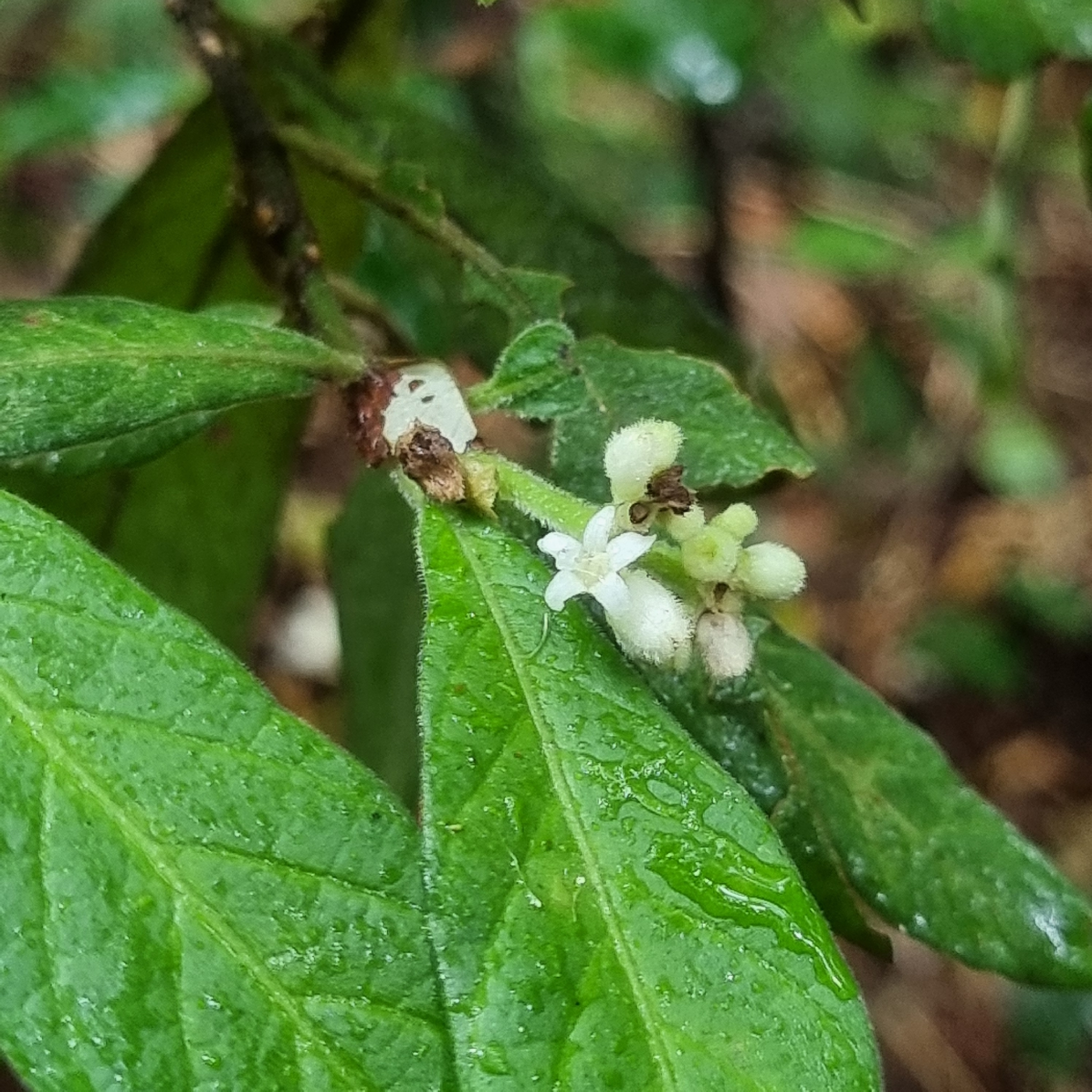
Inflorescence

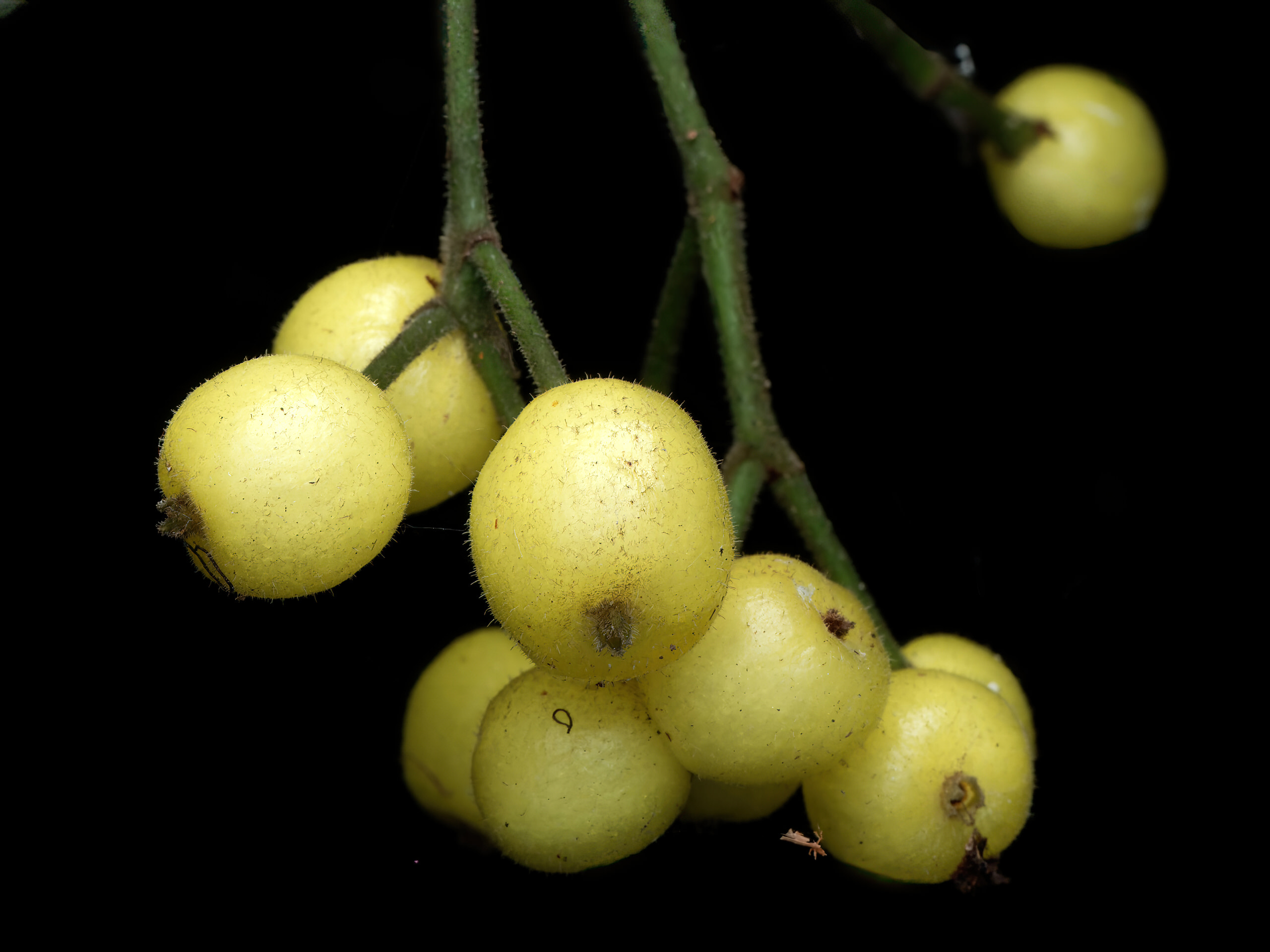
Fruit
