= Psychotria dasyophthalma =

Conservation status
- Vulnerable (IUCN 2.3)

Scientific classification
- Kingdom: Plantae
- Clade: Tracheophytes
- Clade: Angiosperms
- Clade: Eudicots
- Clade: Asterids
- Order: Gentianales
- Family: Rubiaceae
- Genus: Psychotria
- Species: P. dasyophthalma

Binomial name
- Psychotria dasyophthalma Griseb.

Synonyms
- Uragoga dasyophthalma (Griseb.) Kuntze

Species of plant

Psychotria dasyophthalma is a species of plant in the family Rubiaceae. It is endemic to Jamaica.
