= Psychotria taitensis =

Conservation status
- Endangered (IUCN 3.1)

Scientific classification
- Kingdom: Plantae
- Clade: Tracheophytes
- Clade: Angiosperms
- Clade: Eudicots
- Clade: Asterids
- Order: Gentianales
- Family: Rubiaceae
- Genus: Psychotria
- Species: P. taitensis

Binomial name
- Psychotria taitensis Verdc.

Species of plant

Psychotria taitensis is a species of plant in the family Rubiaceae. It is endemic to Kenya.
