= Psychotria tubuaiensis =

Conservation status
- Data Deficient (IUCN 2.3)

Scientific classification
- Kingdom: Plantae
- Clade: Tracheophytes
- Clade: Angiosperms
- Clade: Eudicots
- Clade: Asterids
- Order: Gentianales
- Family: Rubiaceae
- Genus: Psychotria
- Species: P. tubuaiensis

Binomial name
- Psychotria tubuaiensis Fosberg (1937)

Species of plant

Psychotria tubuaiensis is a species of plant in the family Rubiaceae. It is endemic to the Tubuai Islands of French Polynesia.
