= Psychotria abdita =

Scientific classification
- Kingdom: Plantae
- Clade: Tracheophytes
- Clade: Angiosperms
- Clade: Eudicots
- Clade: Asterids
- Order: Gentianales
- Family: Rubiaceae
- Genus: Psychotria
- Species: P. abdita

Binomial name
- Psychotria abdita Standl.

Species of plant

Psychotria abdita is a plant species in the family Rubiaceae and the genus Psychotria. The species is endemic to Peru, and the species was identified by Paul Carpenter Standley in 1929.
