= Psychotria grandiflora =

Conservation status
- Critically Endangered (IUCN 3.1)

Scientific classification
- Kingdom: Plantae
- Clade: Tracheophytes
- Clade: Angiosperms
- Clade: Eudicots
- Clade: Asterids
- Order: Gentianales
- Family: Rubiaceae
- Genus: Psychotria
- Species: P. grandiflora

Binomial name
- Psychotria grandiflora H.Mann

Synonyms
- Homotypic Synonyms: Uragoga grandiflora (H.Mann) Kuntze; Heterotypic Synonyms: Straussia grandiflora Caum

Species of plant

Psychotria grandiflora is a species of flowering plant in the family Rubiaceae. It is sometimes referred to by the common name largeflower wild coffee, large-flowered balsamo or kopiko, endemic to the island of Kauai in the Hawaiian Islands. It grows in rainforest habitat. There are ten small populations remaining, with a total of no more than 30 individuals. This plant was federally listed as an endangered species of the United States in 2010.
