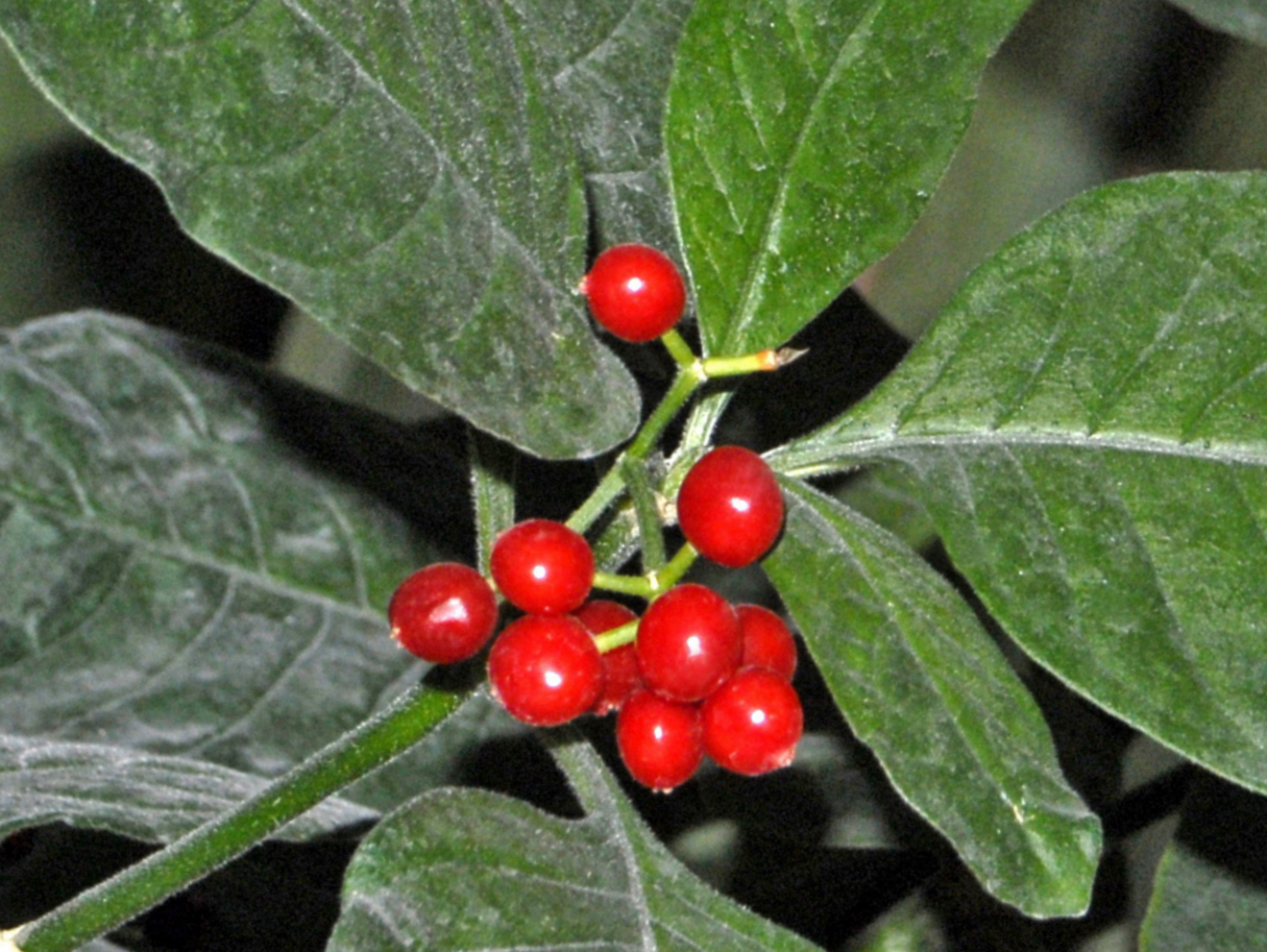
- Psychotria punctata at the Jardin des Plantes, Paris

Scientific classification
- Kingdom: Plantae
- Clade: Tracheophytes
- Clade: Angiosperms
- Clade: Eudicots
- Clade: Asterids
- Order: Gentianales
- Family: Rubiaceae
- Genus: Psychotria
- Species: P. punctata

Binomial name
- Psychotria punctata Vatke

Synonyms
- Apomuria punctata (Vatke) Bremek; Uragoga punctata (Vatke) Kuntze; Psychotria bacteriophila Valeton; Psychotria pachyclada K.Schum. & K.Krause

= Psychotria punctata =

Species of plant

Psychotria punctata, the dotted wild coffee, is a species of plants in the family Rubiaceae.

== Distribution ==
This species can be found from Southern Somalia to Mozambique and Comoros.
