= Psychotria rhonhofiae =

Conservation status
- Data Deficient (IUCN 3.1)

Scientific classification
- Kingdom: Plantae
- Clade: Tracheophytes
- Clade: Angiosperms
- Clade: Eudicots
- Clade: Asterids
- Order: Gentianales
- Family: Rubiaceae
- Genus: Psychotria
- Species: P. rhonhofiae

Binomial name
- Psychotria rhonhofiae K.Krause

Species of plant

Psychotria rhonhofiae is a species of flowering plant in the family Rubiaceae. It is endemic to Ecuador. It was named after Arnold (1875–1948) and Hertha Schultze-Rhonhof, botanists active in Ecuador in the 1930s.
