= Psychotria forsteriana =

Scientific classification
- Kingdom: Plantae
- Clade: Tracheophytes
- Clade: Angiosperms
- Clade: Eudicots
- Clade: Asterids
- Order: Gentianales
- Family: Rubiaceae
- Genus: Psychotria
- Species: P. forsteriana

Binomial name
- Psychotria forsteriana A.Gray

Species of plant

Psychotria forsteriana is a South American rainforest understory shrub from the family Rubiaceae.
