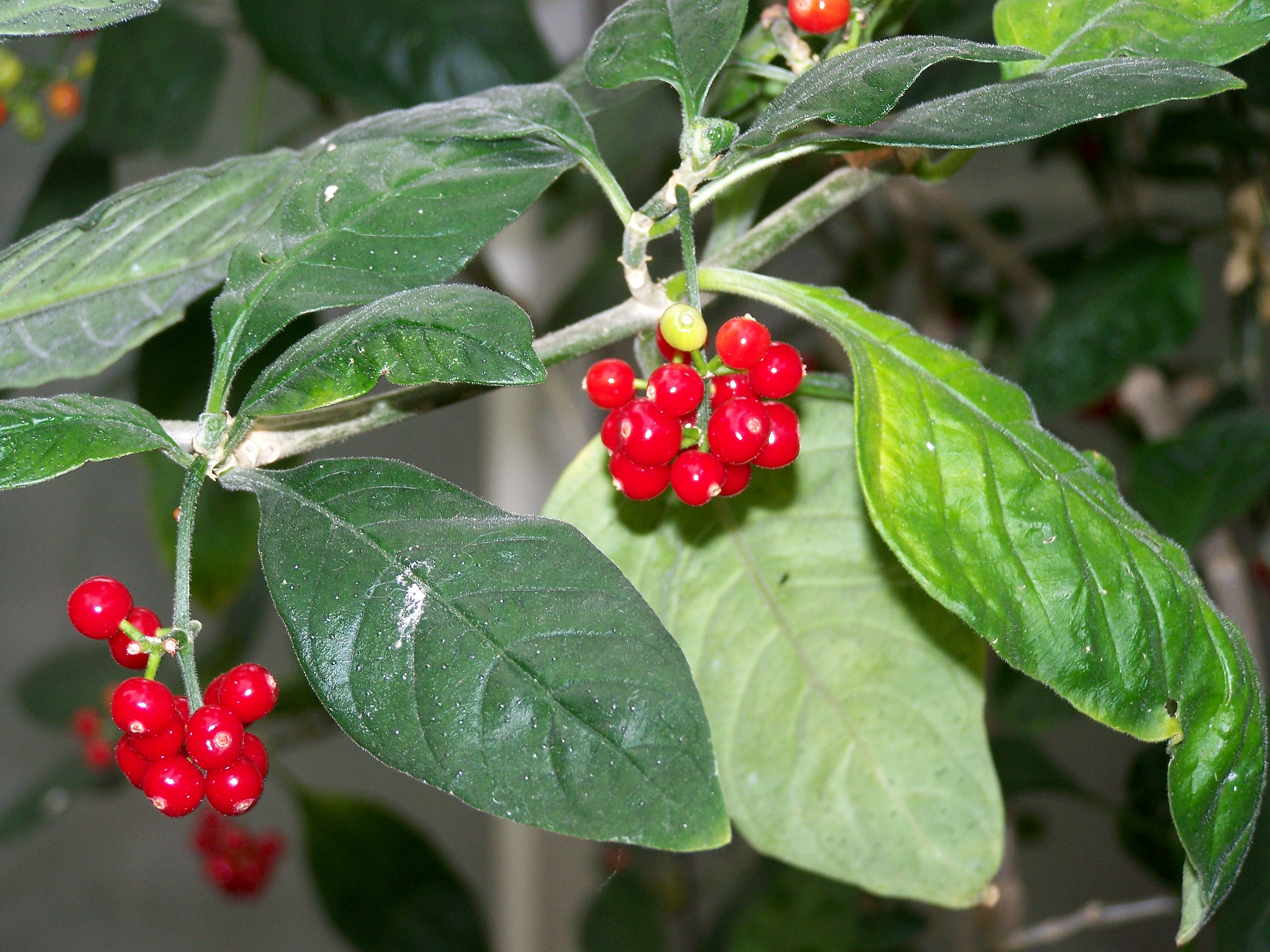
- Psychotria punctata

Scientific classification
- Kingdom: Plantae
- Clade: Tracheophytes
- Clade: Angiosperms
- Clade: Eudicots
- Clade: Asterids
- Order: Gentianales
- Family: Rubiaceae
- Subfamily: Rubioideae
- Tribe: Psychotrieae
- Genus: Psychotria; L.

Type species
- Psychotria asiatica L.

Synonyms
- 45 synonyms: Antherura Lour.; Apomuria Bremek. Aucubaephyllum; Ahlb. Baldingera; Dennst. Callicocca; Schreb. Calycodendron; A.C.Sm. Camptopus; Hook.f. Cephaelis; Sw. Chesnea; Scop. Chicoinaea; Comm. ex DC. Coddingtonia; S.Bowdich Codonocalyx; Miers ex Lindl. Cremocarpon; Boivin ex Baill. Delpechia; Montrouz. Douarrea; Montrouz. Dychotria; Raf. Eumorphanthus; A.C.Sm. Eurhotia; Neck. Furcatella; Baum.-Bod. Galvania; Vand. Gamotopea; Bremek. Grumilea; Gaertn. Hylacium; P.Beauv. Macrocalyx; Miers ex Lindl. Mapouria; Aubl. Megalopus; K.Schum. Myrstiphylla; Raf. Myrstiphyllum; P.Browne Naletonia; Bremek. Petagomoa; Bremek. Pleureia; Raf. Polyozus; Lour. Psathura; Comm. ex A.Juss. Psychotrion; St.-Lag. Psychotrophum; P.Browne Pyragra; Bremek. Ronabia; St.-Lag. Stellia; Noronha Straussia; A.Gray Sulcanux; Raf. Suteria; DC. Tapogomea; Aubl. Trevirania; Heynh. Trigonopyren; Bremek.

= Psychotria =

Genus of flowering plants

Psychotria is a large genus of flowering plants in the coffee family Rubiaceae, with over 1,600 species. The genus has a pantropical distribution and members of the genus are small understorey trees in tropical forests. Some species are endangered or facing extinction due to deforestation, especially species of central Africa and the Pacific.

Many species, including Psychotria viridis, produce the psychedelic chemical dimethyltryptamine (DMT).

== Selected species ==
- Psychotria abdita Standl.
- Psychotria acutiflora DC.
- Psychotria adamsonii
- Psychotria alsophila
- Psychotria angustata
- Psychotria atricaulis
- Psychotria beddomei
- Psychotria bimbiensis
- Psychotria bryonicola
- Psychotria camerunensis
- Psychotria capensis
- Psychotria carronis
- Psychotria carthagenensis
- Psychotria cathetoneura
- Psychotria cernua
- Psychotria chalconeura
- Psychotria chimboracensis
- Psychotria clarendonensis
- Psychotria clusioides
- Psychotria colorata
- Psychotria congesta
- Psychotria cookei
- Psychotria crassipetala
- Psychotria cuneifolia
- Psychotria cyathicalyx
- Psychotria dallachiana
- Psychotria dasyophthalma
- Psychotria densinervia
- Psychotria deverdiana
- Psychotria dolichantha
- Psychotria domatiata
- Psychotria dubia
- Psychotria dura
- Psychotria elachistantha
- Psychotria expansa
- Psychotria fernandopoensis
- Psychotria foetens
- Psychotria forsteriana
- Psychotria franchetiana
- Psychotria fusiformis
- Psychotria gardneri
- Psychotria glandulifera
- Psychotria globicephala
- Psychotria grandiflora
- Psychotria grantii
- Psychotria greenwelliae
- Psychotria grumilia
- Psychotria guerkeana
- Psychotria hanoverensis
- Psychotria hobdyi
- Psychotria insularum
- Psychotria lanceifolia
- Psychotria ligustrifolia
- Psychotria longipetiolata
- Psychotria loniceroides
- Psychotria macrocarpa
- Psychotria marchionica
- Psychotria marginata
- Psychotria mariana
- Psychotria mariniana
- Psychotria megalopus
- Psychotria megistantha
- Psychotria minimicalyx
- Psychotria moseskemei
- Psychotria nervosa
- Psychotria ngotphamii
- Psychotria peteri
- Psychotria petitii
- Psychotria plicata
- Psychotria plurivenia
- Psychotria podocarpa
- Psychotria pseudoplatyphylla
- Psychotria punctata
- Psychotria raivavaensis
- Psychotria rhonhofiae
- Psychotria rimbachii
- Psychotria rostrata
- Psychotria rufipilis
- Psychotria saloiana
- Psychotria siphonophora
- Psychotria sodiroi
- Psychotria sordida
- Psychotria speciosa
- Psychotria srilankensis
- Psychotria tahitensis
- Psychotria taitensis
- Psychotria tenuifolia
- Psychotria trichocalyx
- Psychotria tubuaiensis
- Psychotria viridis
- Psychotria waasii
- Psychotria woytkowskii
- Psychotria yaoundensis
- Psychotria zombamontana

== Formerly placed here ==
- Psychotria elata = Palicourea elata
- Psychotria poeppigiana = Palicourea tomentosa

== Image gallery ==
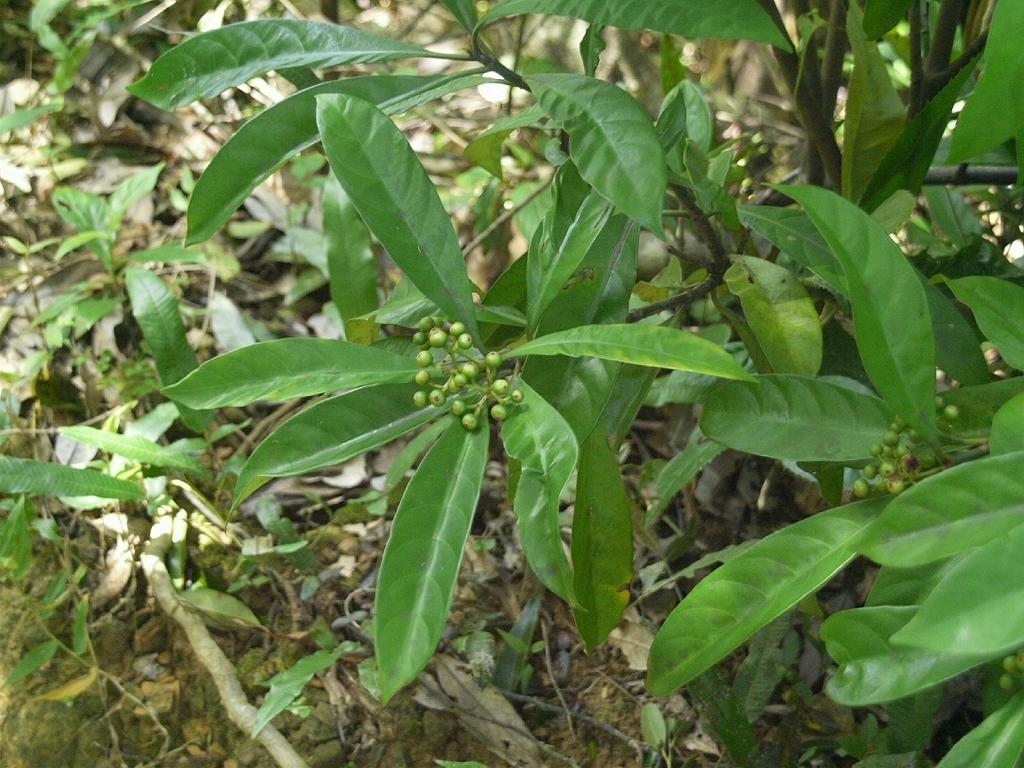
Psychotria asiatica

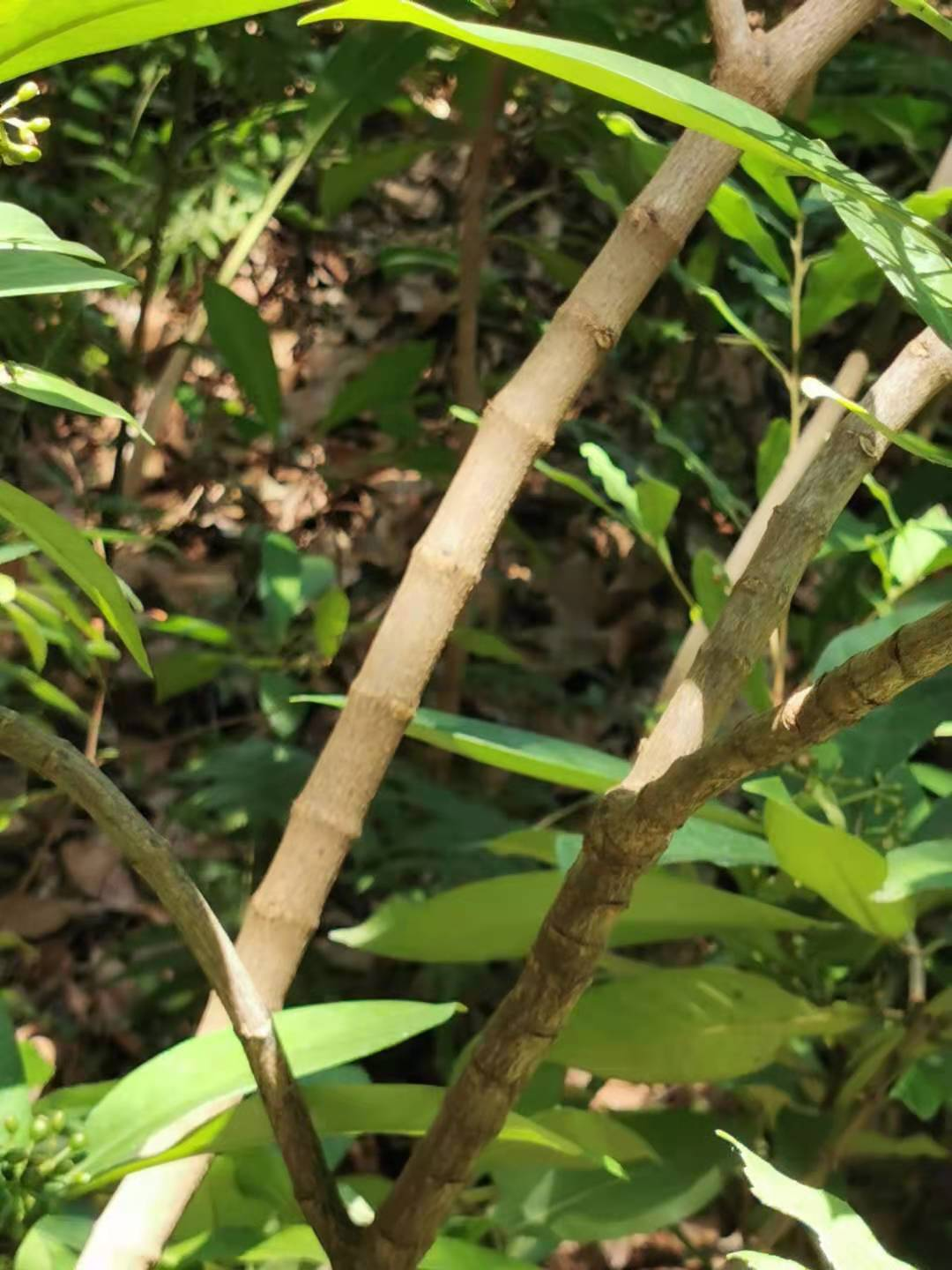
Many nodes on the branches are the main feature of Psychotria asiatica

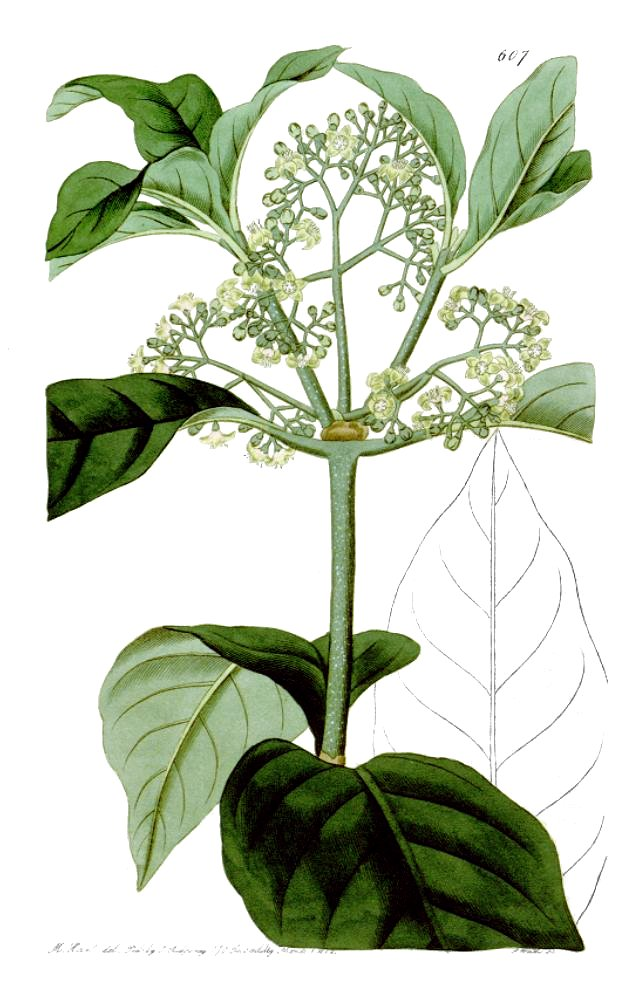
Psychotria elliptica

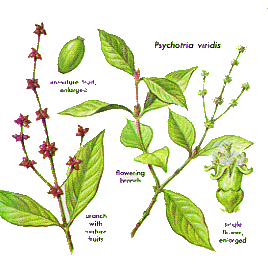
Psychotria viridis

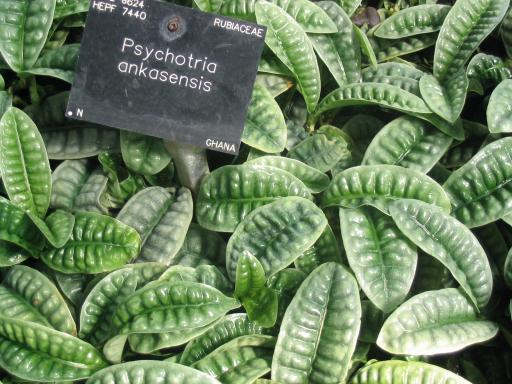
Psychotria ankasensis

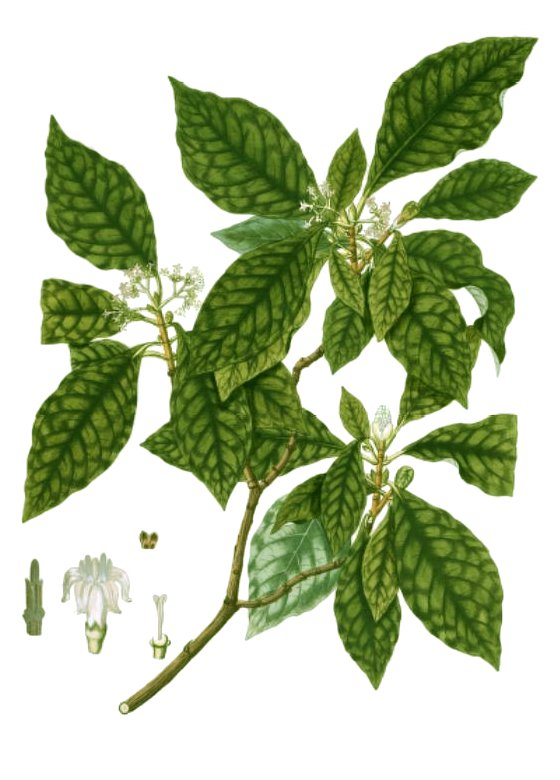
Psychotria nervosa

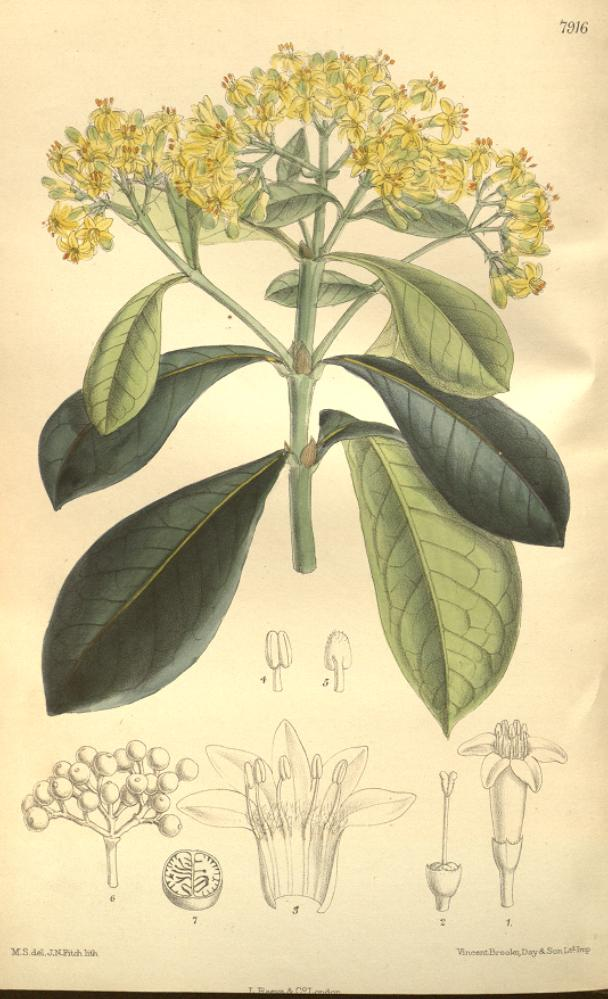
Psychotria capensis

== See also ==
- List of the largest genera of flowering plants
