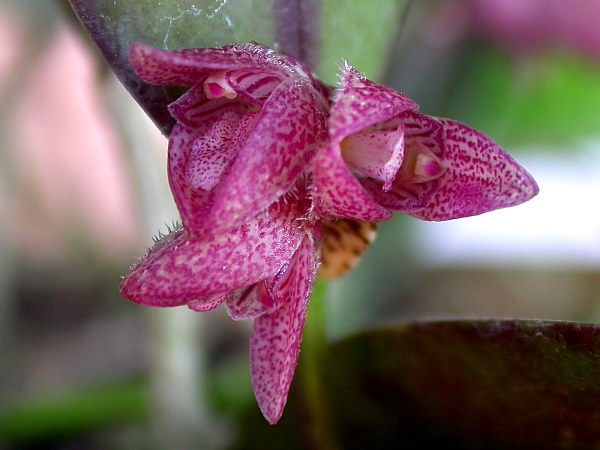

Scientific classification
- Kingdom: Plantae
- Clade: Embryophytes
- Clade: Tracheophytes
- Clade: Spermatophytes
- Clade: Angiosperms
- Clade: Monocots
- Order: Asparagales
- Family: Orchidaceae
- Subfamily: Epidendroideae
- Genus: Acianthera
- Species: A. spilantha

Binomial name
- Acianthera spilantha (Barb.Rodr.) Luer (2007)

Synonyms
- Pleurothallis spilantha Barb.Rodr. (1881) (Basionym); Myoxanthus spilanthus (Barb.Rodr.) Luer (1986); Pleurothallis paspaliformis Loefgr. (1918)

= Acianthera spilantha =

Species of orchid

Acianthera spilantha is a species of orchid.
