= Acianthera scalpricaulis =

Scientific classification
- Kingdom: Plantae
- Clade: Tracheophytes
- Clade: Angiosperms
- Clade: Monocots
- Order: Asparagales
- Family: Orchidaceae
- Subfamily: Epidendroideae
- Genus: Acianthera
- Species: A. scalpricaulis

Binomial name
- Acianthera scalpricaulis (Luer) Pridgeon & M.W.Chase

Synonyms
- Pleurothallis scalpricaulis Luer

Species of plant

Acianthera scalpricaulis is a species of orchid plant native to Ecuador.
