= Acianthera aculeata =

Scientific classification
- Kingdom: Plantae
- Clade: Tracheophytes
- Clade: Angiosperms
- Clade: Monocots
- Order: Asparagales
- Family: Orchidaceae
- Subfamily: Epidendroideae
- Genus: Acianthera
- Species: A. aculeata

Binomial name
- Acianthera aculeata (Luer & Hirtz) Luer

Synonyms
- Pleurothallis aculeata Luer & Hirtz

Species of orchid

Acianthera aculeata is a species of orchid native to Ecuador.
