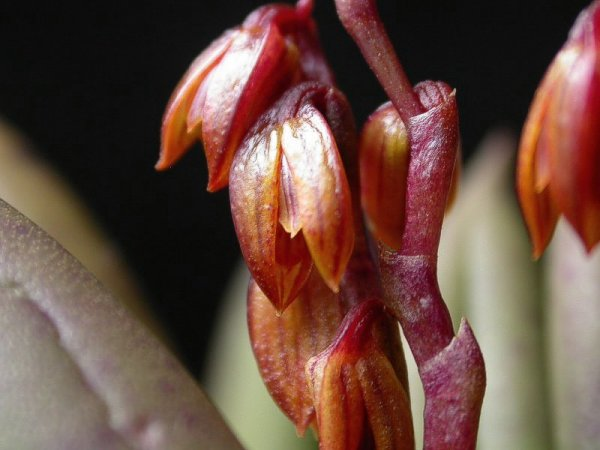

Scientific classification
- Kingdom: Plantae
- Clade: Tracheophytes
- Clade: Angiosperms
- Clade: Monocots
- Order: Asparagales
- Family: Orchidaceae
- Subfamily: Epidendroideae
- Genus: Acianthera
- Species: A. johannensis

Binomial name
- Acianthera johannensis (Barb.Rodr.) Pridgeon & M.W. Chase (2001)

Synonyms
- Pleurothallis johannensis Barb.Rodr. (1881) (basionym)

= Acianthera johannensis =

Species of orchid

Acianthera johannensis is a species of orchid.
