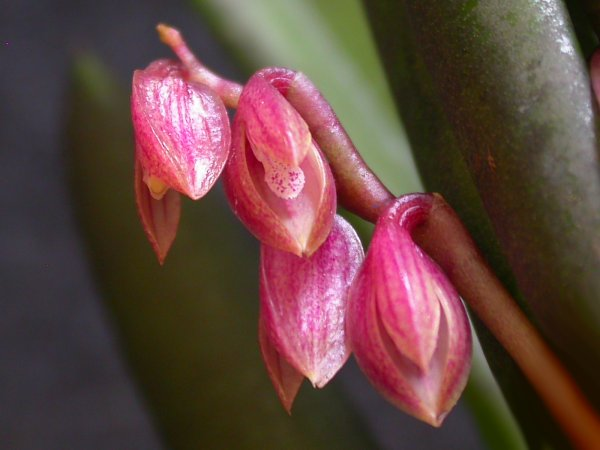

Scientific classification
- Kingdom: Plantae
- Clade: Tracheophytes
- Clade: Angiosperms
- Clade: Monocots
- Order: Asparagales
- Family: Orchidaceae
- Subfamily: Epidendroideae
- Genus: Acianthera
- Species: A. fabiobarrosii

Binomial name
- Acianthera fabiobarrosii (Borba & Semir) F. Barros & F. Pinheiro (2002)

Synonyms
- Pleurothallis fabiobarrosii Borba & Semir (2000) (Basionym)

= Acianthera fabiobarrosii =

Species of orchid

Acianthera fabiobarrosii is a species of orchid.
