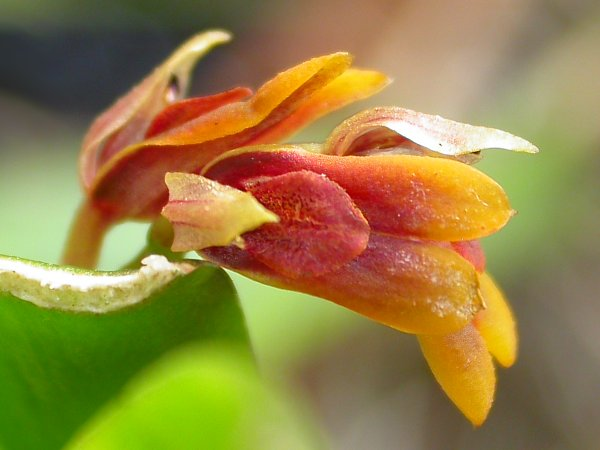

Scientific classification
- Kingdom: Plantae
- Clade: Tracheophytes
- Clade: Angiosperms
- Clade: Monocots
- Order: Asparagales
- Family: Orchidaceae
- Subfamily: Epidendroideae
- Genus: Acianthera
- Species: A. fockei

Binomial name
- Acianthera fockei (Lindl.) Pridgeon & M.W. Chase (2001)

Synonyms
- Pleurothallis fockei Lindl. (1859) (Basionym); Pleurothallis tricarinata H. Focke (1853); Humboldtia fockei (Lindl.) Kuntze (1891)

= Acianthera fockei =

Species of orchid

Acianthera fockei is a species of orchid.
