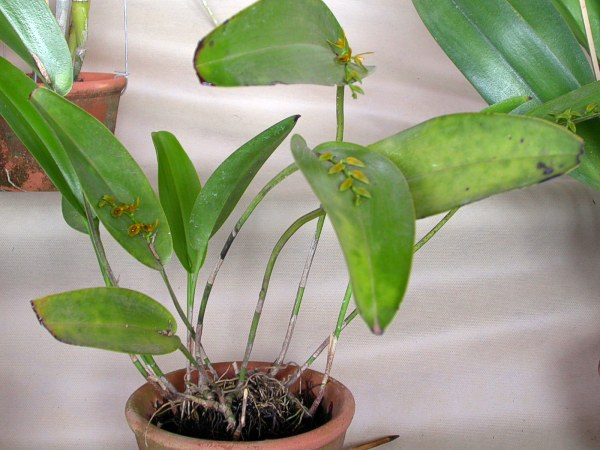

Scientific classification
- Kingdom: Plantae
- Clade: Tracheophytes
- Clade: Angiosperms
- Clade: Monocots
- Order: Asparagales
- Family: Orchidaceae
- Subfamily: Epidendroideae
- Genus: Acianthera
- Species: A. binotii

Binomial name
- Acianthera binotii (Regel) Pridgeon & M.W.Chase

Synonyms
- Pleurothallis binotii Regel

= Acianthera binotii =

Species of orchid

Acianthera binotii is a species of orchid plant native to Brazil.
