= Acianthera aberrans =

Scientific classification
- Kingdom: Plantae
- Clade: Tracheophytes
- Clade: Angiosperms
- Clade: Monocots
- Order: Asparagales
- Family: Orchidaceae
- Subfamily: Epidendroideae
- Genus: Acianthera
- Species: A. aberrans

Binomial name
- Acianthera aberrans (Luer) Pupulin & Bogarín

Synonyms
- Pleurothallis aberrans Luer

Species of plant

Acianthera aberrans is a species of orchid plant native to Costa Rica, Ecuador, Panamá.
