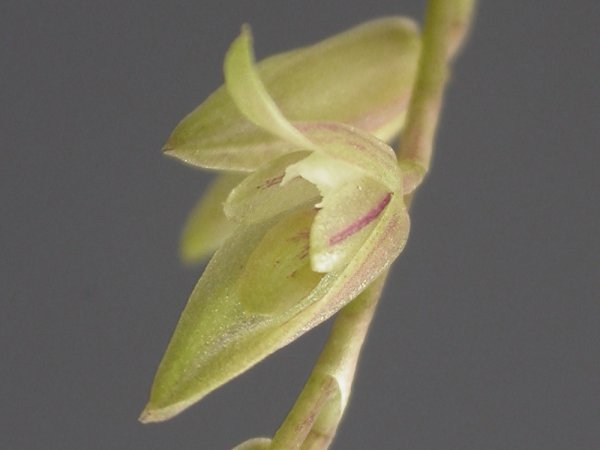
- Flower

Scientific classification
- Kingdom: Plantae
- Clade: Tracheophytes
- Clade: Angiosperms
- Clade: Monocots
- Order: Asparagales
- Family: Orchidaceae
- Subfamily: Epidendroideae
- Genus: Acianthera
- Species: A. gracilis

Binomial name
- Acianthera gracilis (Barb.Rodr.) F.Barros & L.R.S.Guim.

= Acianthera gracilis =

Species of orchid

Acianthera gracilis is a species of orchid endemic to Brazil (Minas Gerais).
