= Acianthera chionopa =

Scientific classification
- Kingdom: Plantae
- Clade: Tracheophytes
- Clade: Angiosperms
- Clade: Monocots
- Order: Asparagales
- Family: Orchidaceae
- Subfamily: Epidendroideae
- Genus: Acianthera
- Species: A. chionopa

Binomial name
- Acianthera chionopa (Luer) Pridgeon & M.W.Chase

Synonyms
- Pleurothallis chionopa Luer

Species of plant

Acianthera chionopa is a species of epiphytic orchid native to Colombia and Ecuador.
