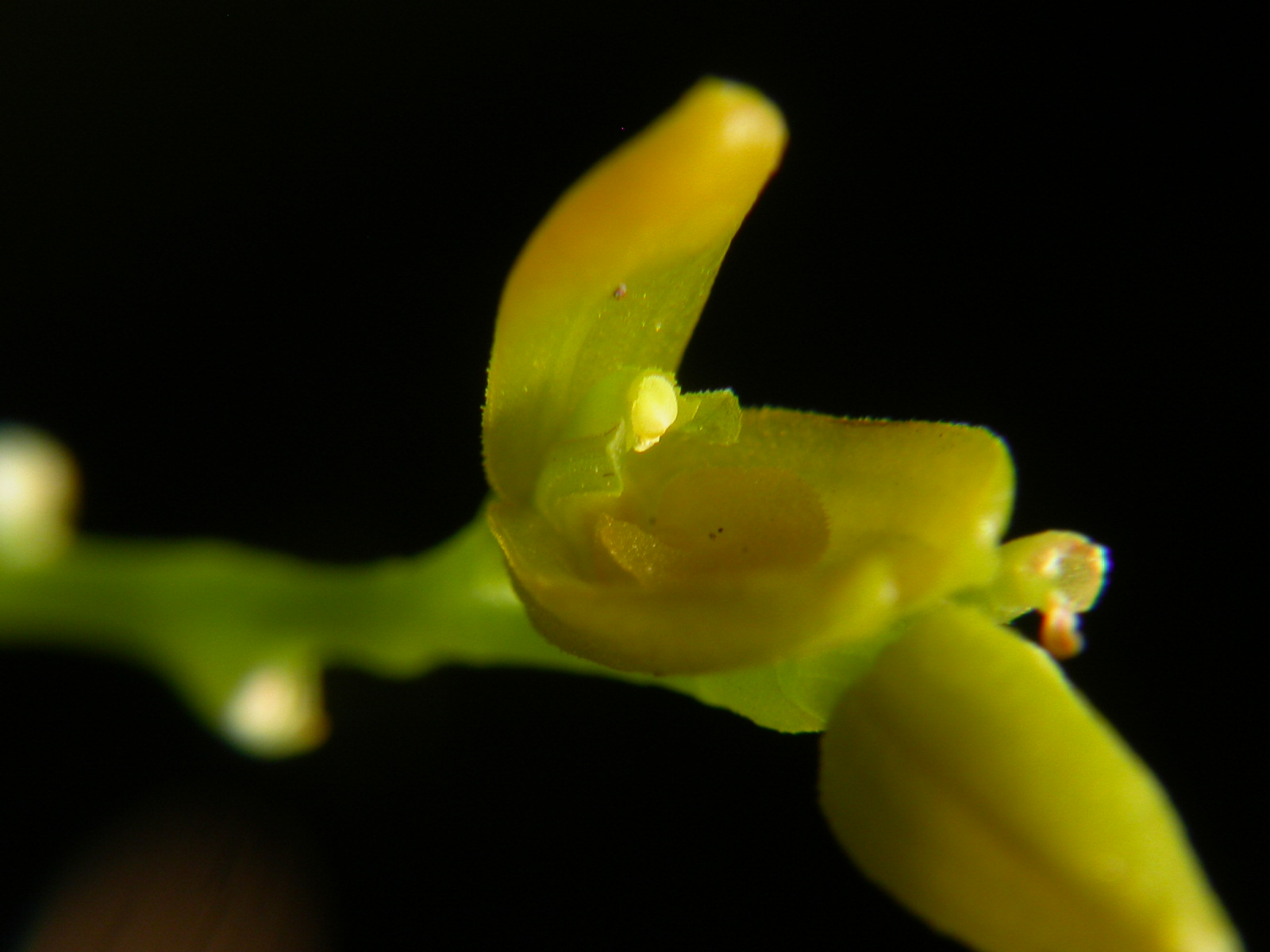

Scientific classification
- Kingdom: Plantae
- Clade: Tracheophytes
- Clade: Angiosperms
- Clade: Monocots
- Order: Asparagales
- Family: Orchidaceae
- Subfamily: Epidendroideae
- Genus: Acianthera
- Species: A. pardipes

Binomial name
- Acianthera pardipes (Rchb.f.) Pridgeon & M.W. Chase (2001)

Synonyms
- Pleurothallis pardipes Rchb.f. (1872) (basionym)

= Acianthera pardipes =

Species of orchid

Acianthera pardipes is a species of orchid found in Brazil in the states Santa Catarina and Rio de Janeiro.
