= Acianthera bragae =

Scientific classification
- Kingdom: Plantae
- Clade: Tracheophytes
- Clade: Angiosperms
- Clade: Monocots
- Order: Asparagales
- Family: Orchidaceae
- Subfamily: Epidendroideae
- Genus: Acianthera
- Species: A. bragae

Binomial name
- Acianthera bragae (Ruschi) F.Barros

Species of orchid

Acianthera bragae is a species of orchid. It is named after Dr. Pedro Ivo Soares Braga, a botanist known for his long-standing work with Amazonian orchids. It forms low, creeping mats only about 2.5 cm tall, with ramicauls spaced roughly 0.5 cm apart. Each inflorescence typically bears two flowers—occasionally one, and rarely three—measuring 1.5 to 2 cm in height. The species is native to southeastern Brazil, growing in montane cloud forests between 700 and 1,000 m elevation, usually on shaded trunks, branches, or decaying wood within five meters of the forest floor. In its natural habitat, it blooms from summer through early autumn.
