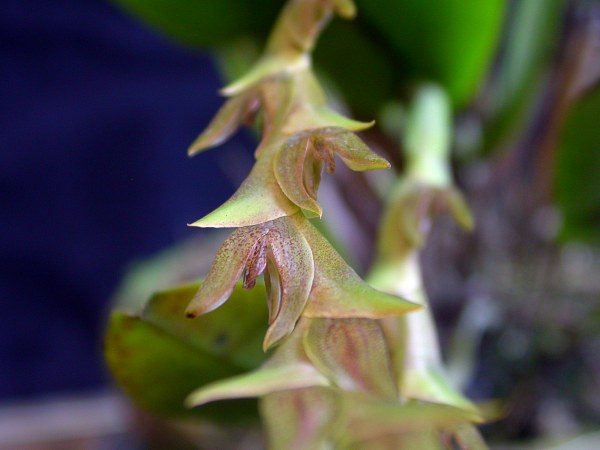

Scientific classification
- Kingdom: Plantae
- Clade: Embryophytes
- Clade: Tracheophytes
- Clade: Angiosperms
- Clade: Monocots
- Order: Asparagales
- Family: Orchidaceae
- Subfamily: Epidendroideae
- Genus: Acianthera
- Species: A. tricarinata

Binomial name
- Acianthera tricarinata (Poepp. & Endl.) Pridgeon & M.W. Chase (2001)

Synonyms
- Pleurothallis tricarinata Poepp. & Endl. (1836) (Basionym); Humboldtia tricarinata (Poepp. & Endl.) Kuntze (1891); Pleurothallis acutangula H. Wendl. & Kraenzl. (1900); Pleurothallis trialata Rolfe (1907); Pleurothallis triptera Schltr. (1922)

= Acianthera tricarinata =

Species of orchid

Acianthera tricarinata is a species of orchid.
