= Acianthera barthelemyi =

Scientific classification
- Kingdom: Plantae
- Clade: Tracheophytes
- Clade: Angiosperms
- Clade: Monocots
- Order: Asparagales
- Family: Orchidaceae
- Subfamily: Epidendroideae
- Genus: Acianthera
- Species: A. barthelemyi

Binomial name
- Acianthera barthelemyi (Luer) Karremans

Synonyms
- Pleurothallis barthelemyi Luer

Species of orchid

Acianthera barthelemyi is a species of orchid plant native to French Guiana.
