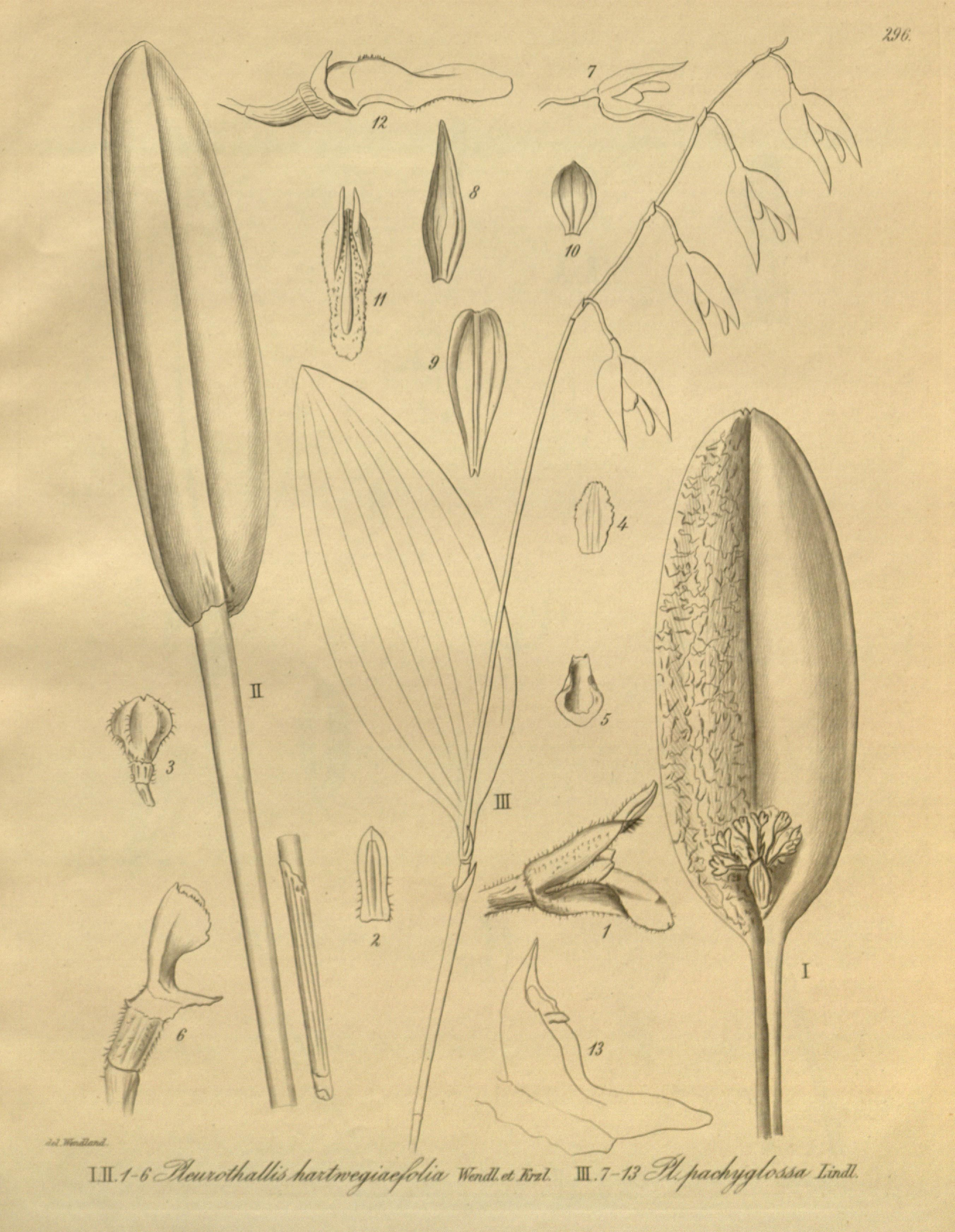

Scientific classification
- Kingdom: Plantae
- Clade: Tracheophytes
- Clade: Angiosperms
- Clade: Monocots
- Order: Asparagales
- Family: Orchidaceae
- Subfamily: Epidendroideae
- Genus: Acianthera
- Species: A. chrysantha

Binomial name
- Acianthera chrysantha (Lindl.) Pridgeon & M.W.Chase

Synonyms
- Pleurothallis chrysantha Lindl.

= Acianthera chrysantha =

Species of plant

Acianthera chrysantha is a species of orchid plant native to Mexico.
