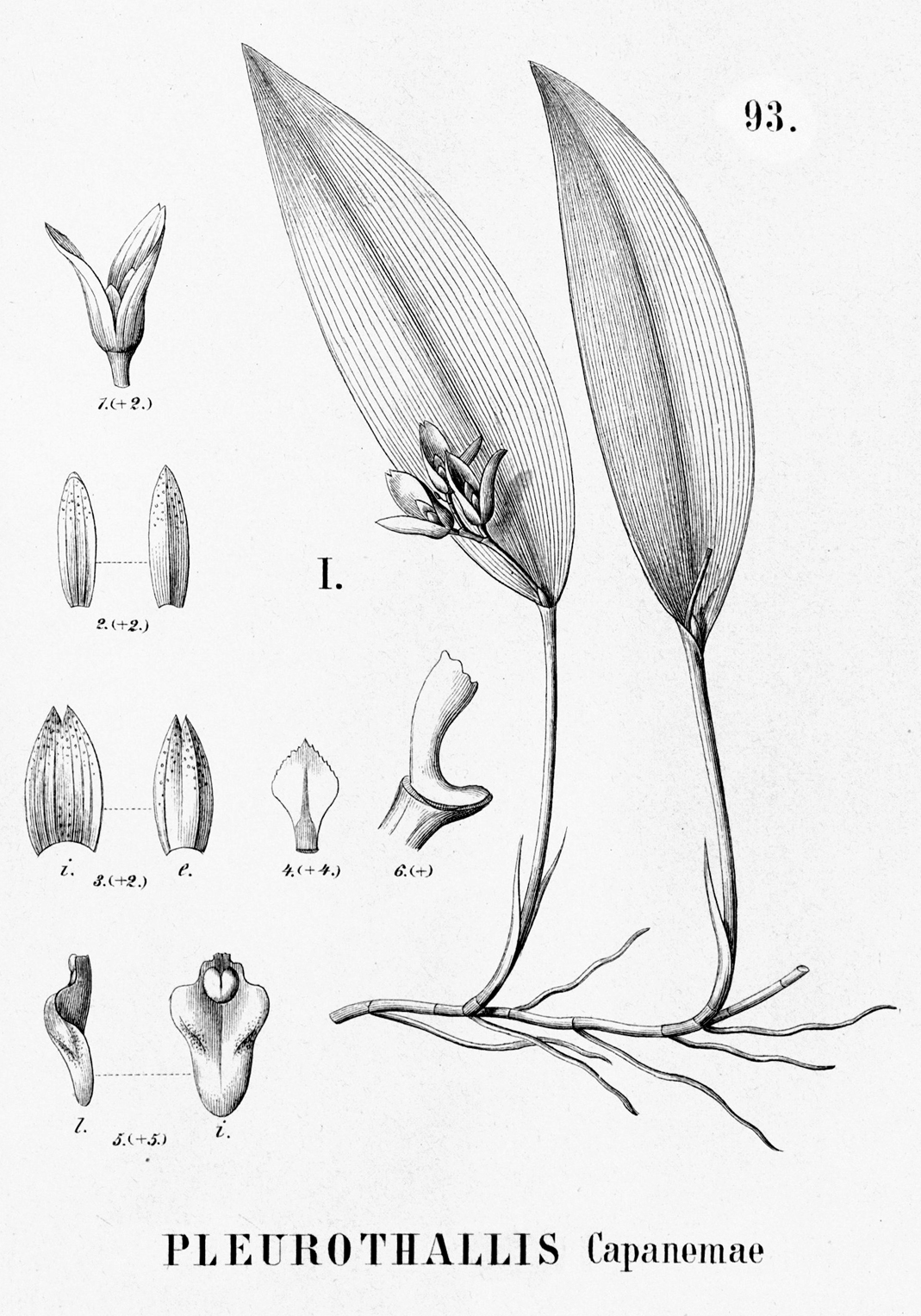
- Acianthera capanemae (as Pleurothallis capanemae) - cutout from Flora Brasiliensis 3-4-93 fig I

Scientific classification
- Kingdom: Plantae
- Clade: Tracheophytes
- Clade: Angiosperms
- Clade: Monocots
- Order: Asparagales
- Family: Orchidaceae
- Subfamily: Epidendroideae
- Genus: Acianthera
- Species: A. capanemae

Binomial name
- Acianthera capanemae (Barb.Rodr.) Pridgeon & M.W.Chase

Synonyms
- Pleurothallis capanemae Barb.Rodr.

= Acianthera capanemae =

Species of orchid

Acianthera capanemae is a species of orchid plant native to Brazil.
