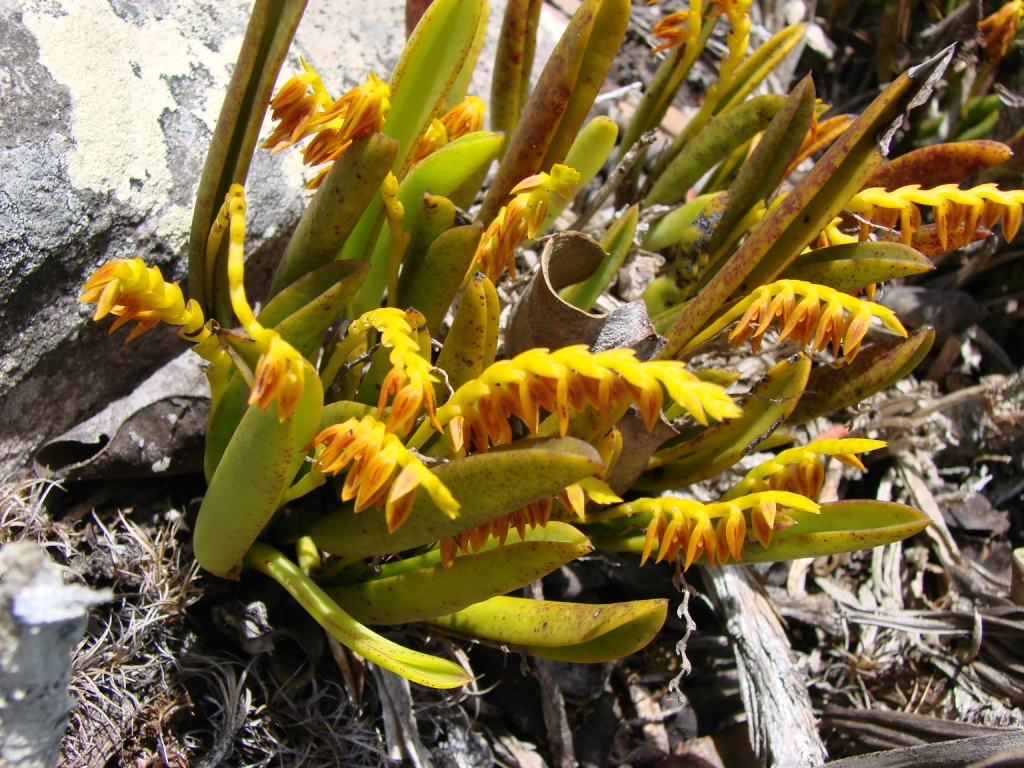

Scientific classification
- Kingdom: Plantae
- Clade: Tracheophytes
- Clade: Angiosperms
- Clade: Monocots
- Order: Asparagales
- Family: Orchidaceae
- Subfamily: Epidendroideae
- Genus: Acianthera
- Species: A. ochreata

Binomial name
- Acianthera ochreata (Lindl.) Pridgeon & M.W.Chase

Synonyms
- Humboltia ochreata (Lindl.) Kuntze; Pleurothallis bahiensis Pabst; Pleurothallis ochreata Lindl.

= Acianthera ochreata =

Species of orchid

Acianthera ochreata is a species of orchid native to eastern Brazil.
