= Acianthera butcheri =

Scientific classification
- Kingdom: Plantae
- Clade: Tracheophytes
- Clade: Angiosperms
- Clade: Monocots
- Order: Asparagales
- Family: Orchidaceae
- Subfamily: Epidendroideae
- Genus: Acianthera
- Species: A. butcheri

Binomial name
- Acianthera butcheri (L.O.Williams) Pridgeon & M.W.Chase

Synonyms
- Pleurothallis butcheri L.O.Williams

Species of plant

Acianthera butcheri is a species of orchid plant native to Panama.
