= Acianthera calypso =

Scientific classification
- Kingdom: Plantae
- Clade: Tracheophytes
- Clade: Angiosperms
- Clade: Monocots
- Order: Asparagales
- Family: Orchidaceae
- Subfamily: Epidendroideae
- Genus: Acianthera
- Species: A. calypso

Binomial name
- Acianthera calypso (Luer) Karremans & Rinc.-González

Synonyms
- Pleurothallis calypso Luer

Species of plant

Acianthera calypso is a species of orchid plant native to Ecuador.
