= Acianthera alainii =

Scientific classification
- Kingdom: Plantae
- Clade: Tracheophytes
- Clade: Angiosperms
- Clade: Monocots
- Order: Asparagales
- Family: Orchidaceae
- Subfamily: Epidendroideae
- Genus: Acianthera
- Species: A. alainii

Binomial name
- Acianthera alainii (Dod) A.Doucette

Synonyms
- Pleurothallis alainii Dod

Species of plant

Acianthera alainii is a species of orchid native to the Dominican Republic.
