= Acianthera sulcata =

Scientific classification
- Kingdom: Plantae
- Clade: Tracheophytes
- Clade: Angiosperms
- Clade: Monocots
- Order: Asparagales
- Family: Orchidaceae
- Subfamily: Epidendroideae
- Genus: Acianthera
- Species: A. sulcata

Binomial name
- Acianthera sulcata (Porsch) F.Barros & V.T.Rodrigues

Synonyms
- Pleurothallis sulcata Porsch

Species of plant

Acianthera sulcata is a species of orchid plant native to Brazil.
