= Acianthera hondurensis =

Conservation status
- Least Concern (IUCN 3.1)

Scientific classification
- Kingdom: Plantae
- Clade: Tracheophytes
- Clade: Angiosperms
- Clade: Monocots
- Order: Asparagales
- Family: Orchidaceae
- Subfamily: Epidendroideae
- Genus: Acianthera
- Species: A. hondurensis

Binomial name
- Acianthera hondurensis (Ames) Pridgeon & M.W. Chase

Species of orchid

Acianthera hondurensis is a species of orchid native to the Atlantic slope of Mexico, Belize and Central America.
