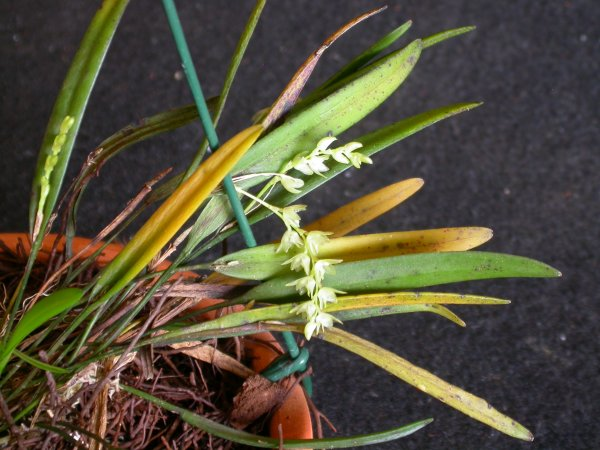

Scientific classification
- Kingdom: Plantae
- Clade: Tracheophytes
- Clade: Angiosperms
- Clade: Monocots
- Order: Asparagales
- Family: Orchidaceae
- Subfamily: Epidendroideae
- Genus: Acianthera
- Species: A. hygrophila

Binomial name
- Acianthera hygrophila (Barb.Rodr.) Pridgeon & M.W.Chase

Synonyms
- Pleurothallis barbacenensis Barb.Rodr.

= Acianthera hygrophila =

Species of orchid

Acianthera hygrophila is a species of orchid plant native to Brazil.
