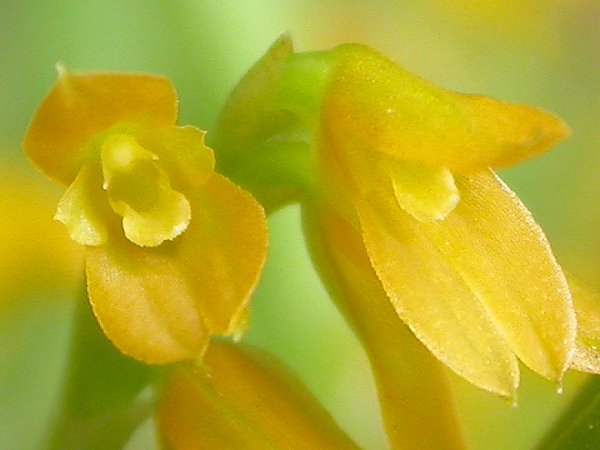

Scientific classification
- Kingdom: Plantae
- Clade: Tracheophytes
- Clade: Angiosperms
- Clade: Monocots
- Order: Asparagales
- Family: Orchidaceae
- Subfamily: Epidendroideae
- Genus: Acianthera
- Species: A. sonderiana

Binomial name
- Acianthera sonderiana (Rchb.f.) Pridgeon & M.W. Chase (2001)

Synonyms
- Pleurothallis sonderiana Rchb.f. (1850) (Basionym); Pleurothallis sonderiana var. longicaulis Barb.Rodr. (1882); Humboldtia sonderiana (Rchb.f.) Kuntze (1891); Specklinia sonderiana (Rchb.f.) F. Barros (1983)

= Acianthera sonderiana =

Species of orchid

Acianthera sonderiana is a species of orchid.
