= Acianthera tokachii =

Scientific classification
- Kingdom: Plantae
- Clade: Tracheophytes
- Clade: Angiosperms
- Clade: Monocots
- Order: Asparagales
- Family: Orchidaceae
- Subfamily: Epidendroideae
- Genus: Acianthera
- Species: A. tokachii

Binomial name
- Acianthera tokachii (Luer) Luer

Synonyms
- Pleurothallis tokachii Luer

Species of plant

Acianthera tokachii is a species of orchid plant native to Peru.
