= Acianthera per-dusenii =

Scientific classification
- Kingdom: Plantae
- Clade: Tracheophytes
- Clade: Angiosperms
- Clade: Monocots
- Order: Asparagales
- Family: Orchidaceae
- Subfamily: Epidendroideae
- Genus: Acianthera
- Species: A. per-dusenii

Binomial name
- Acianthera per-dusenii Hoehne

Synonyms
- Pleurothallis per-dusenii Hoehne

Species of plant

Acianthera per-dusenii is a species of orchid plant native to Panama.
