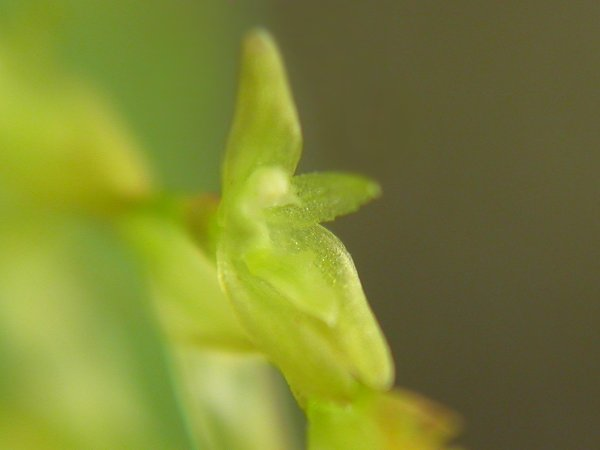

Scientific classification
- Kingdom: Plantae
- Clade: Tracheophytes
- Clade: Angiosperms
- Clade: Monocots
- Order: Asparagales
- Family: Orchidaceae
- Subfamily: Epidendroideae
- Genus: Acianthera
- Species: A. caldensis

Binomial name
- Acianthera caldensis (Hoehne & Schltr.) F.Barros

Synonyms
- Pleurothallis caldensis Hoehne & Schltr.

= Acianthera caldensis =

Species of plant

Acianthera caldensis is a species of orchid plant native to Brazil.
