= Acianthera beyrodtiana =

Scientific classification
- Kingdom: Plantae
- Clade: Tracheophytes
- Clade: Angiosperms
- Clade: Monocots
- Order: Asparagales
- Family: Orchidaceae
- Subfamily: Epidendroideae
- Genus: Acianthera
- Species: A. beyrodtiana

Binomial name
- Acianthera beyrodtiana (Kraenzl.) Karremans

Synonyms
- Pleurothallis beyrodtiana Kraenzl.

Species of orchid

Acianthera beyrodtiana is a species of orchid plant.
