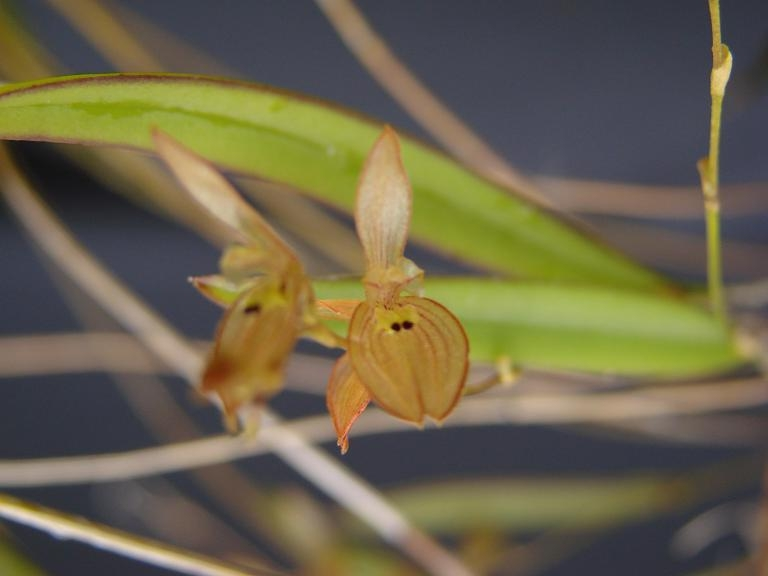

Scientific classification
- Kingdom: Plantae
- Clade: Tracheophytes
- Clade: Angiosperms
- Clade: Monocots
- Order: Asparagales
- Family: Orchidaceae
- Subfamily: Epidendroideae
- Genus: Acianthera
- Species: A. octophrys

Binomial name
- Acianthera octophrys (Rchb.f.) Pridgeon & M.W.Chase

Synonyms
- Pleurothallis octophyrs Rchb.f.; Pleurothallis unguiculata Hoehne

= Acianthera octophrys =

Species of plant

Acianthera octophrys is a species of orchid plant native to Brazil.
