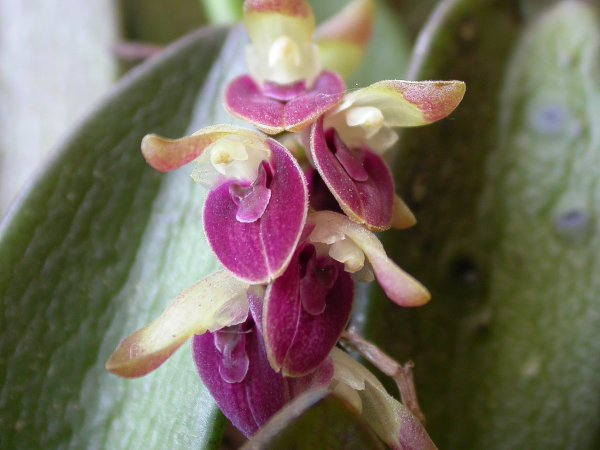

Scientific classification
- Kingdom: Plantae
- Clade: Tracheophytes
- Clade: Angiosperms
- Clade: Monocots
- Order: Asparagales
- Family: Orchidaceae
- Subfamily: Epidendroideae
- Genus: Acianthera
- Species: A. recurva

Binomial name
- Acianthera recurva (Lindl.) Pridgeon & M.W. Chase (2001)

Synonyms
- Pleurothallis recurva Lindl. (1841) (Basionym); Acianthera punctata Scheidw. (1842); Humboldtia acianthera (Lindl.) Kuntze (1891); Humboldtia recurva (Lindl.) Kuntze (1891); Pleurothallis acianthera Lindl. (1859); Pleurothallis albipetala (Barb.Rodr.) Hoehne & Schltr. (1921); Pleurothallis bistuberculata Barb.Rodr. (1881); Pleurothallis curitybensis Kraenzl. (1921); Pleurothallis lamproglossa Schltr. (1918); Pleurothallis leucorhoda Schltr. (1925); Pleurothallis lilacina Barb.Rodr. (1877); Pleurothallis lilacina var. albipetala Barb.Rodr. (1881); Pleurothallis lilacina var. microphylla Barb.Rodr. (1881); Pleurothallis maculata Rolfe (1893); Pleurothallis recurva Lindl. (1841); Pleurothallis recurva var. microphylla (Barb.Rodr.) Garay (1954); Pleurothallis regeliana Rchb.f. (1886); Specklinia recurva (Lindl.) F. Barros (1983)

= Acianthera recurva =

Species of orchid

Acianthera recurva is a species of orchid.
