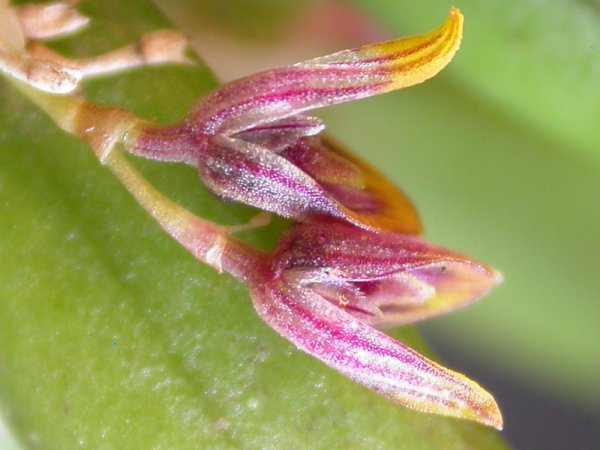

Scientific classification
- Kingdom: Plantae
- Clade: Tracheophytes
- Clade: Angiosperms
- Clade: Monocots
- Order: Asparagales
- Family: Orchidaceae
- Subfamily: Epidendroideae
- Genus: Acianthera
- Species: A. papillosa

Binomial name
- Acianthera papillosa (Lindl.) Pridgeon & M.W. Chase (2001)

Synonyms
- Pleurothallis papillosa Lindl. (1835) (Basionym); Humboldtia papillosa (Lindl.) Kuntze (1891)

= Acianthera papillosa =

Species of orchid

Acianthera papillosa is a species of orchid.
