= Acianthera albopurpurea =

Scientific classification
- Kingdom: Plantae
- Clade: Tracheophytes
- Clade: Angiosperms
- Clade: Monocots
- Order: Asparagales
- Family: Orchidaceae
- Subfamily: Epidendroideae
- Genus: Acianthera
- Species: A. albopurpurea

Binomial name
- Acianthera albopurpurea (Kraenzl.) Chiron & Van den Berg

Synonyms
- Pleurothallis albopurpurea Kraenzl.

Species of plant

Acianthera albopurpurea is a species of orchid plant native to Brazil.
