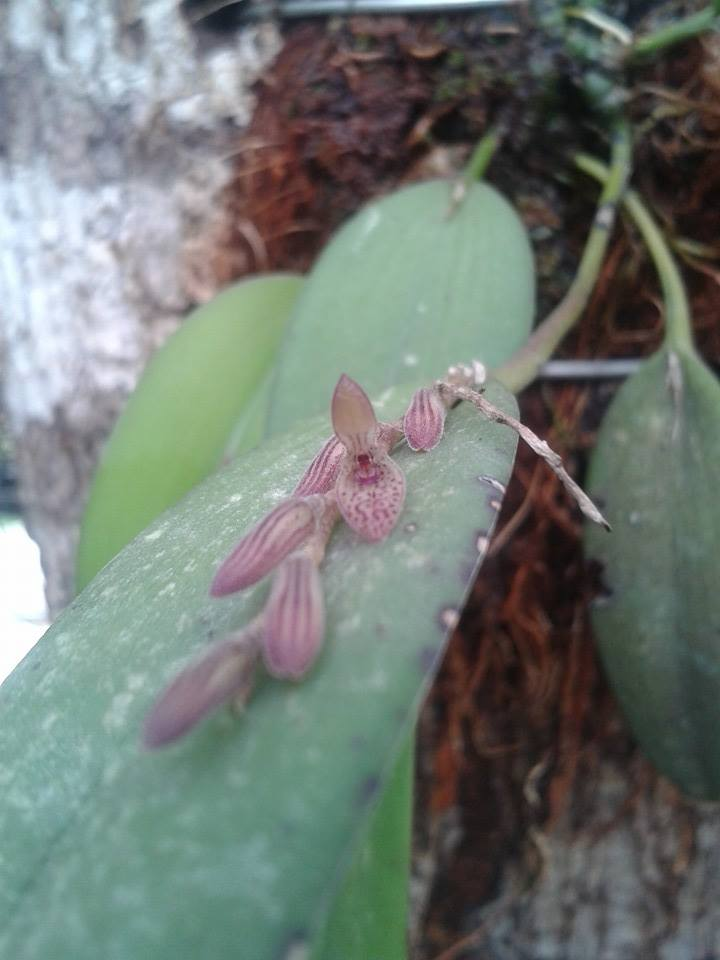

Scientific classification
- Kingdom: Plantae
- Clade: Tracheophytes
- Clade: Angiosperms
- Clade: Monocots
- Order: Asparagales
- Family: Orchidaceae
- Subfamily: Epidendroideae
- Genus: Acianthera
- Species: A. verecunda

Binomial name
- Acianthera verecunda (Schltr.) Pridgeon & M.W.Chase

Synonyms
- Pleurothallis verecunda Schltr.

= Acianthera verecunda =

Species of plant

Acianthera verecunda is a species of orchid plant native to Costa Rica, Ecuador, Guatemala, Nicaragua, and Panama.
