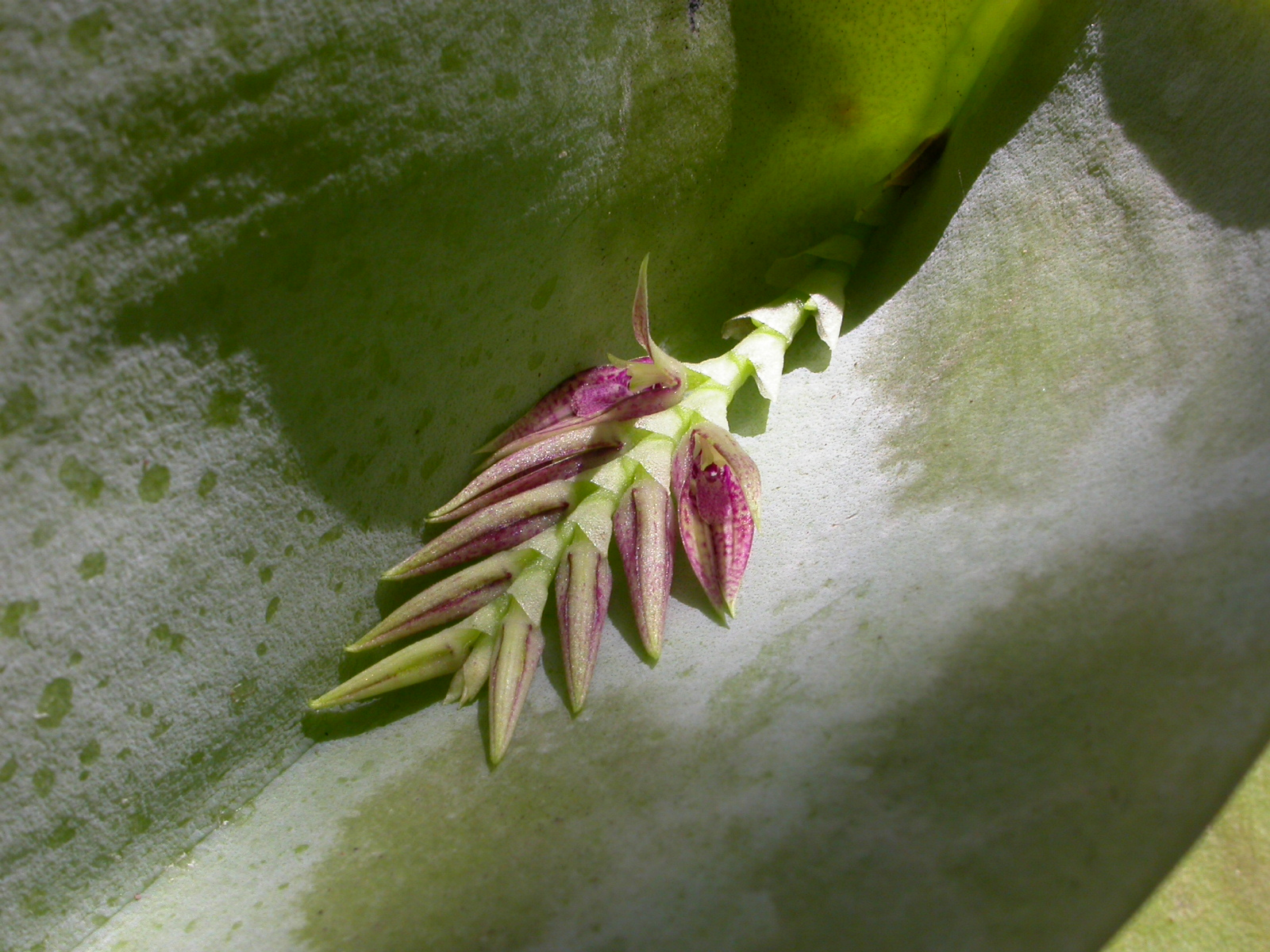

Scientific classification
- Kingdom: Plantae
- Clade: Tracheophytes
- Clade: Angiosperms
- Clade: Monocots
- Order: Asparagales
- Family: Orchidaceae
- Subfamily: Epidendroideae
- Genus: Acianthera
- Species: A. pectinata

Binomial name
- Acianthera pectinata (Lindl.) Pridgeon & M.W. Chase (2001)

Synonyms
- Pleurothallis pectinata Lindl. (1839) (Basionym); Humboldtia pectinata (Lindl.) Kuntze (1891); Pleurothallis pectinata var. major Cogn. (1896)

= Acianthera pectinata =

Species of orchid

Acianthera pectinata is a species of orchid.
