= Acianthera pernambucensis =

Scientific classification
- Kingdom: Plantae
- Clade: Tracheophytes
- Clade: Angiosperms
- Clade: Monocots
- Order: Asparagales
- Family: Orchidaceae
- Subfamily: Epidendroideae
- Genus: Acianthera
- Species: A. pernambucensis

Binomial name
- Acianthera pernambucensis (Rolfe) F.Barros

Synonyms
- Pleurothallis pernambucensis Rolfe

Species of plant

Acianthera pernambucensis is a species of orchid plant native to Brazil.
