= Acianthera biceps =

Scientific classification
- Kingdom: Plantae
- Clade: Tracheophytes
- Clade: Angiosperms
- Clade: Monocots
- Order: Asparagales
- Family: Orchidaceae
- Subfamily: Epidendroideae
- Genus: Acianthera
- Species: A. biceps

Binomial name
- Acianthera biceps (Luer & Hirtz) Luer

Synonyms
- Pleurothallis biceps Luer & Hirtz

Species of orchid

Acianthera biceps is a species of orchid plant native to Ecuador.
