= Acianthera circumplexa =

Scientific classification
- Kingdom: Plantae
- Clade: Embryophytes
- Clade: Tracheophytes
- Clade: Spermatophytes
- Clade: Angiosperms
- Clade: Monocots
- Order: Asparagales
- Family: Orchidaceae
- Subfamily: Epidendroideae
- Genus: Acianthera
- Species: A. circumplexa

Binomial name
- Acianthera circumplexa (Lindl.) Pridgeon & M.W.Chase

Synonyms
- Pleurothallis circumplexa Lindl.

Species of plant

Acianthera circumplexa is a species of orchid plant native to Guatemala.
