= Acianthera angustifolia =

Scientific classification
- Kingdom: Plantae
- Clade: Tracheophytes
- Clade: Angiosperms
- Clade: Monocots
- Order: Asparagales
- Family: Orchidaceae
- Subfamily: Epidendroideae
- Genus: Acianthera
- Species: A. angustifolia

Binomial name
- Acianthera angustifolia (Lindl.) Luer

Synonyms
- Pleurothallis angustifolia Lindl.

Species of orchid

Acianthera angustifolia is a species of orchid plant native to Central America.
