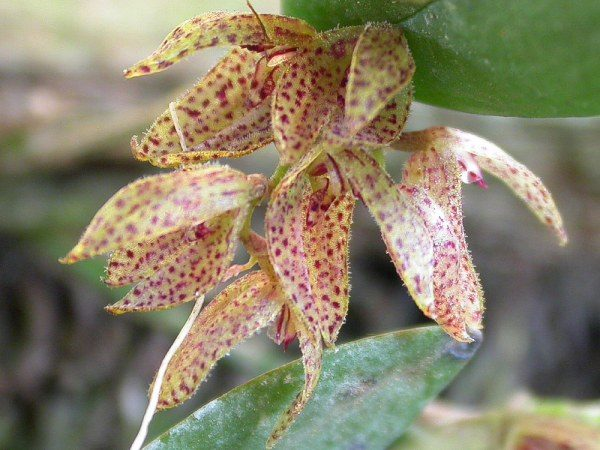

Scientific classification
- Kingdom: Plantae
- Clade: Tracheophytes
- Clade: Angiosperms
- Clade: Monocots
- Order: Asparagales
- Family: Orchidaceae
- Subfamily: Epidendroideae
- Genus: Acianthera
- Species: A. bicornuta

Binomial name
- Acianthera bicornuta (Barb.Rodr.) Pridgeon & M.W. Chase (2001)

Synonyms
- Lepanthes bicornuta Barb.Rodr. (1881) (Basionym); Pleurothallis bicornuta (Barb.Rodr.) Cogn. (1896)

= Acianthera bicornuta =

Species of orchid

== Introduction ==
Acianthera bicornuta is a species of orchid & is native to parts of Central and South America. Known for its delicate and unique flowers, this species is part of the Acianthera genus, which includes a variety of orchids with similar characteristics.
