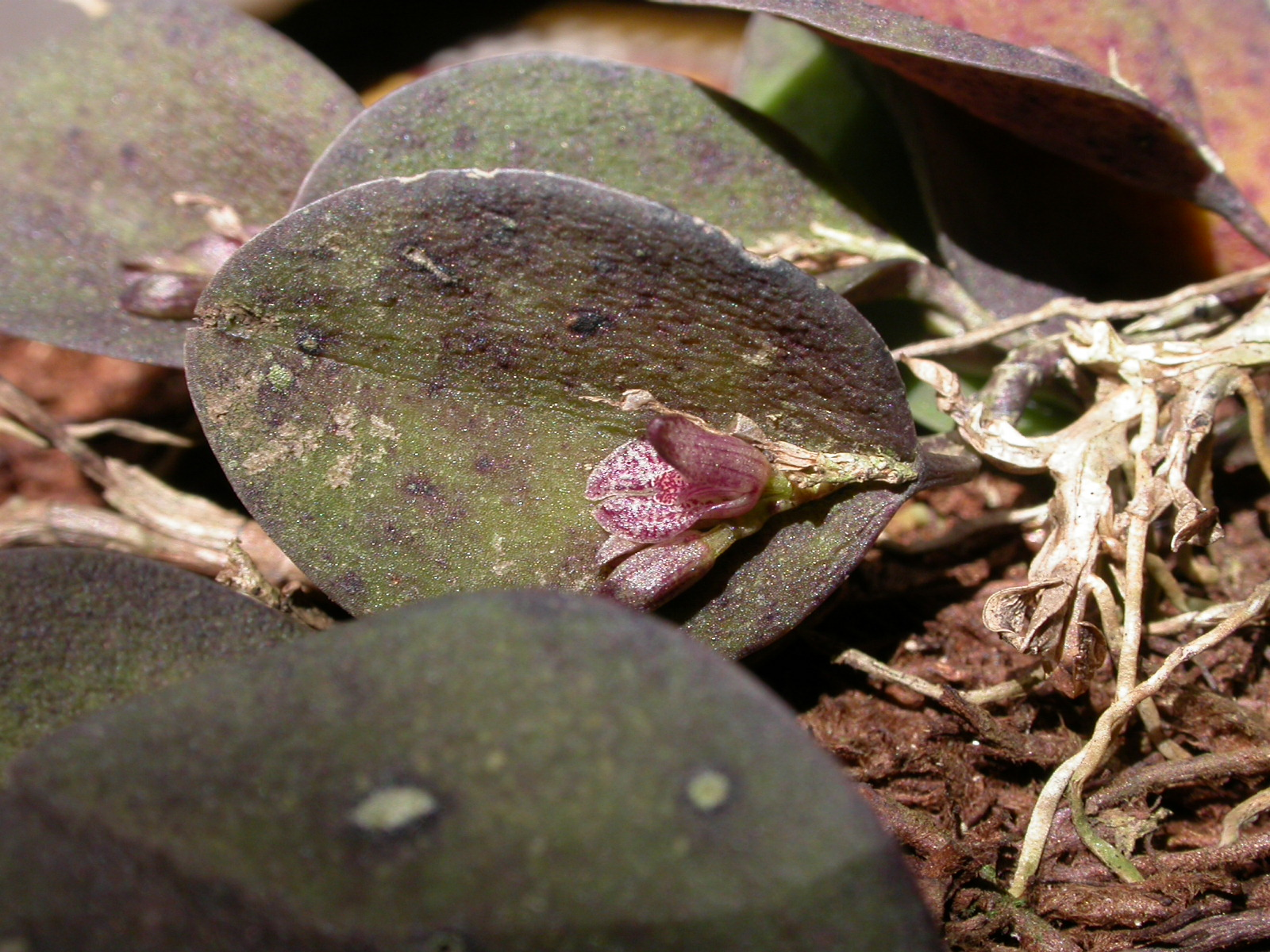

Scientific classification
- Kingdom: Plantae
- Clade: Embryophytes
- Clade: Tracheophytes
- Clade: Angiosperms
- Clade: Monocots
- Order: Asparagales
- Family: Orchidaceae
- Subfamily: Epidendroideae
- Genus: Acianthera
- Species: A. rostellata

Binomial name
- Acianthera rostellata (Lindl.) Pridgeon & M.W. Chase (2001)

Synonyms
- Pleurothallis rostellata Barb.Rodr. (1877) (basionym)

= Acianthera rostellata =

Species of orchid

Acianthera rostellata is a species of orchid.
