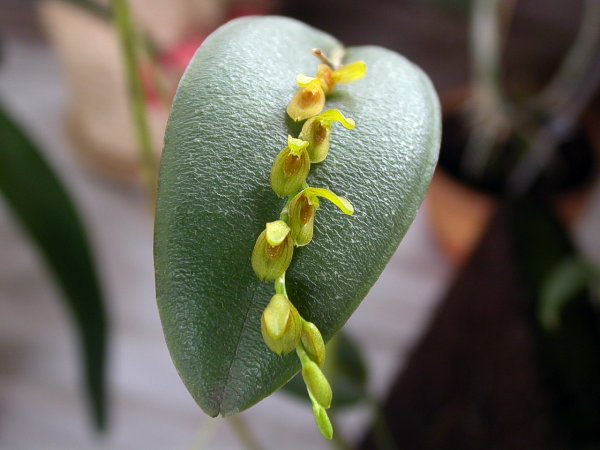

Scientific classification
- Kingdom: Plantae
- Clade: Tracheophytes
- Clade: Angiosperms
- Clade: Monocots
- Order: Asparagales
- Family: Orchidaceae
- Subfamily: Epidendroideae
- Genus: Acianthera
- Species: A. macropoda

Binomial name
- Acianthera macropoda (Barb.Rodr.) Pridgeon & M.W. Chase (2001)

Synonyms
- Pleurothallis macropoda Barb.Rodr. (1881) (Basionym); Pleurothallis macropoda var. laevis Barb.Rodr. (1882)

= Acianthera macropoda =

Species of orchid

Acianthera macropoda is a species of orchid.
