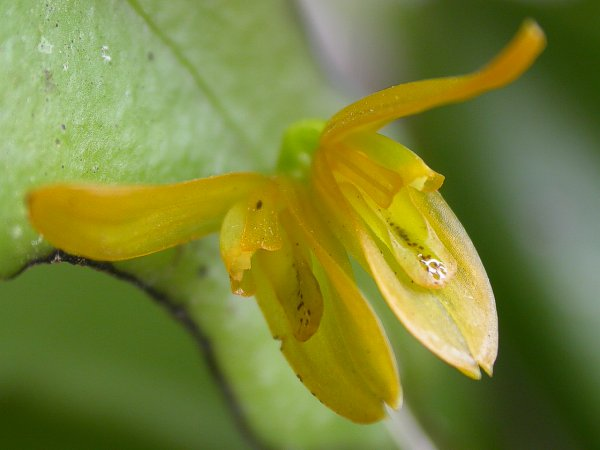
- Acianthera luteola

Scientific classification
- Kingdom: Plantae
- Clade: Tracheophytes
- Clade: Angiosperms
- Clade: Monocots
- Order: Asparagales
- Family: Orchidaceae
- Subfamily: Epidendroideae
- Tribe: Epidendreae
- Subtribe: Pleurothallidinae
- Genus: Acianthera; Scheidw.

Type species
- Acianthera punctata Scheidw.

Synonyms
- Cryptophoranthus Barb.Rodr.; Brenesia Schltr.; Geocalpa Brieger in F.R.R.Schlechter, invalid; Sarracenella Luer; Aberrantia Luer; Didactylus Luer; Unguella Luer; Arthrosia (Luer) Luer; Dondodia Luer; Ogygia Luer

= Acianthera =

Genus of orchids

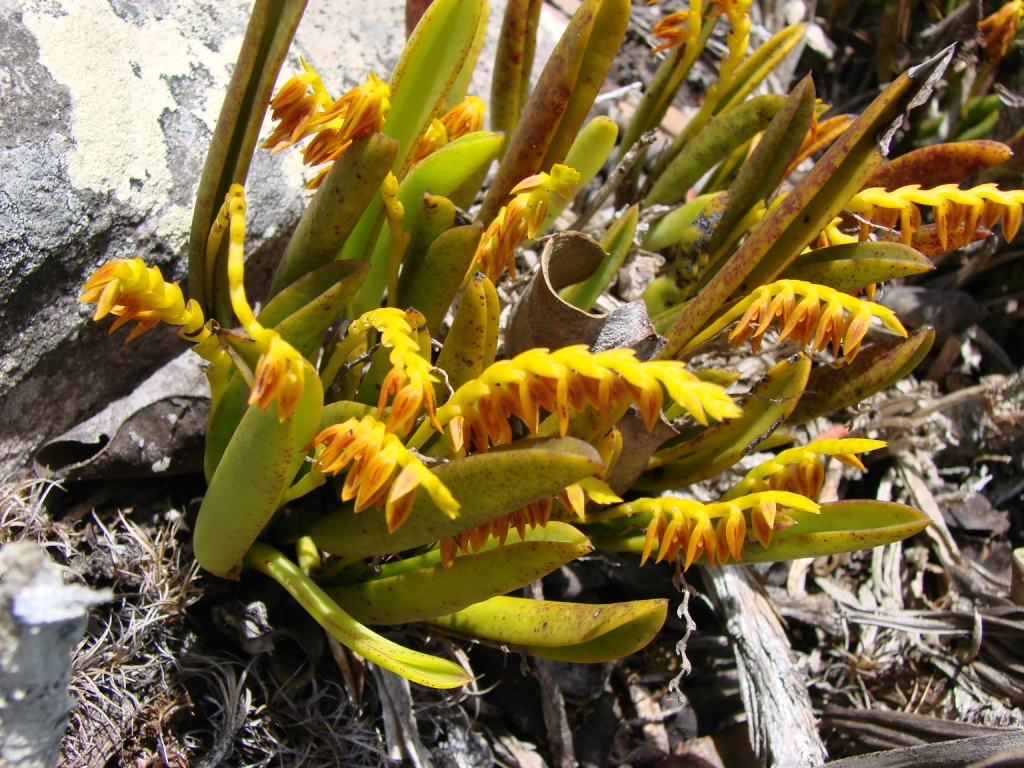
Acianthera ochreata

Acianthera is a genus of orchids native to the tropical parts of the Western Hemisphere, especially Brazil. It was first described in 1842 but was not widely recognized until recently. Most of the species were formerly placed under Pleurothallis subgenus Acianthera. This splitting is a result of recent DNA sequencing.

== Species ==
As of May 2025, Plants of the World Online accepts 302 species within Acianthera:

- Acianthera aberrans (Luer) Pupulin & Bogarín
- Acianthera aculeata (Luer & Hirtz) Luer
- Acianthera acuminatipetala (A.Samp.) Luer
- Acianthera adamantinensis (Brade) F.Barros
- Acianthera adeodata P.Ortiz, O.Pérez & E.Parra
- Acianthera adirii (Brade) Pridgeon & M.W.Chase
- Acianthera aechme (Luer) Pridgeon & M.W.Chase
- Acianthera agathophylla (Rchb.f.) Pridgeon & M.W.Chase
- Acianthera alainii (Dod) A.Doucette
- Acianthera albiflora (Barb.Rodr.) Karremans
- Acianthera albopurpurea (Kraenzl.) Chiron & Van den Berg
- Acianthera alpestris (Sw.) A.Doucette
- Acianthera amandae Campacci & C.R.M.Silva
- Acianthera amaralii (Pabst) F.Barros & L.R.S.Guim.
- Acianthera amsleri Rykacz., Driessen & Kolan.
- Acianthera angustifolia (Lindl.) Luer
- Acianthera angustisepala (Ames & Correll) Pridgeon & M.W.Chase
- Acianthera antennata (Garay) Pridgeon & M.W.Chase
- Acianthera aphthosa (Lindl.) Pridgeon & M.W.Chase
- Acianthera appendiculata (Cogn.) A.Doucette
- Acianthera asaroides (Kraenzl.) Pridgeon & M.W.Chase
- Acianthera atroglossa (Loefgr.) F.Barros & L.R.S.Guim.
- Acianthera atropurpurea (Barb.Rodr.) Chiron & Van den Berg
- Acianthera auriculata (Lindl.) Pridgeon & M.W.Chase
- Acianthera bahorucensis (Luer) A.Doucette
- Acianthera barthelemyi (Luer) Karremans
- Acianthera berlinensis Damian, Chiron, Mitidieri & Rimarachin
- Acianthera beyrodtiana (Kraenzl.) Karremans
- Acianthera bibarbellata (Kraenzl.) F.Barros & L.R.S.Guim.
- Acianthera bicarinata (Lindl.) Pridgeon & M.W.Chase
- Acianthera biceps (Luer & Hirtz) Luer
- Acianthera bicornuta (Barb.Rodr.) Pridgeon & M.W.Chase
- Acianthera bidentata (Lindl.) F.Barros & V.T.Rodrigues
- Acianthera bidentula (Barb.Rodr.) Pridgeon & M.W.Chase
- Acianthera bilobulata Zambrano & Solano
- Acianthera binotii (Regel) Pridgeon & M.W.Chase
- Acianthera bissei (Luer) Luer
- Acianthera boliviana (Rchb.f.) Pridgeon & M.W.Chase
- Acianthera brachiloba (Hoehne) Pridgeon & M.W.Chase
- Acianthera bragae (Ruschi) F.Barros
- Acianthera breedlovei Soto Arenas, Solano & Salazar
- Acianthera breviflora (Lindl.) Luer
- Acianthera brunnescens (Schltr.) Karremans
- Acianthera bryonii Luer
- Acianthera butcheri (L.O.Williams) Pridgeon & M.W.Chase
- Acianthera cabiriae Pupulin, G.A.Rojas & J.D.Zuñiga
- Acianthera cachensis (Ames) Karremans
- Acianthera caldensis (Hoehne & Schltr.) F.Barros
- Acianthera calopedilon Toscano & Luer
- Acianthera calypso (Luer) Karremans & Rinc.-González
- Acianthera capanemae (Barb.Rodr.) Pridgeon & M.W.Chase
- Acianthera caparaoensis (Brade) Pridgeon & M.W.Chase
- Acianthera capillaris (Lindl.) Pridgeon & M.W.Chase
- Acianthera carcinopsis Luer & Sijm
- Acianthera carinata (C.Schweinf.) Luer
- Acianthera catujiensis Campacci & C.R.M.Silva
- Acianthera caymanensis (C.D.Adams) Karremans
- Acianthera cephalopodiglossa Toscano & Luer
- Acianthera cerberus (Luer & R.Vásquez) Pridgeon & M.W.Chase
- Acianthera chamelopoda (Luer) Luer
- Acianthera chionopa (Luer) Pridgeon & M.W.Chase
- Acianthera chrysantha (Lindl.) Pridgeon & M.W.Chase
- Acianthera ciliata (Knowles & Westc.) F.Barros & L.R.S.Guim.
- Acianthera circumplexa (Lindl.) Pridgeon & M.W.Chase
- Acianthera cogniauxiana (Schltr.) Pridgeon & M.W.Chase
- Acianthera compressicaulis (Dod) Pridgeon & M.W.Chase
- Acianthera consatae (Luer & R.Vásquez) Luer
- Acianthera cordatifolia (Dod) Pridgeon & M.W.Chase
- Acianthera cornejoi Luer
- Acianthera costabilis (Luer & R.Vásquez) Luer
- Acianthera costaricensis (Schltr.) Pupulin & Karremans
- Acianthera crassilabia (Ames & C.Schweinf.) Luer
- Acianthera cremasta (Luer & J.Portilla) Luer
- Acianthera crepiniana (Cogn.) Chiron & Van den Berg
- Acianthera crinita (Barb.Rodr.) Pridgeon & M.W.Chase
- Acianthera cryptantha (Barb.Rodr.) Pridgeon & M.W.Chase
- Acianthera cryptophoranthoides (Loefgr.) F.Barros
- Acianthera decipiens (Ames & C.Schweinf.) Pridgeon & M.W.Chase
- Acianthera decurrens (Poepp. & Endl.) Pridgeon & M.W.Chase
- Acianthera denticulata (Cogn.) Karremans
- Acianthera deserta (Luer & R.Vásquez) Luer
- Acianthera dichroa (Rchb.f.) F.Barros & L.R.S.Guim.
- Acianthera discophylla (Luer & Carnevali) Luer
- Acianthera dodsonii (Luer) Karremans & Rinc.-González
- Acianthera duartei (Hoehne) Pridgeon & M.W.Chase
- Acianthera dubbeldamii Luer & Sijm
- Acianthera dutrae (Pabst) C.N.Gonç. & Waechter
- Acianthera echinocarpa (C.Schweinf.) A.Doucette
- Acianthera echinosa Luer & Toscano
- Acianthera ellipsophylla (L.O.Williams) Pridgeon & M.W.Chase
- Acianthera erebatensis (Carnevali & G.A.Romero) Luer
- Acianthera ericae Luer
- Acianthera erinacea (Rchb.f.) A.Doucette
- Acianthera erosa (Urb.) A.Doucette
- Acianthera erythrogramma (Luer & Carnevali) Luer
- Acianthera esmeraldae (Luer & Hirtz) Luer
- Acianthera exarticulata (Barb.Rodr.) Pridgeon & M.W.Chase
- Acianthera exdrasii (Luer & Toscano) Luer
- Acianthera eximia (L.O.Williams) Solano
- Acianthera fabiobarrosii (Borba & Semir) F.Barros & F.Pinheiro
- Acianthera fecunda Pupulin, G.A.Rojas & J.D.Zuñiga
- Acianthera fenestrata (Barb.Rodr.) Pridgeon & M.W.Chase
- Acianthera fernandezii Luer
- Acianthera fockei (Lindl.) Pridgeon & M.W.Chase
- Acianthera foetens (Lindl.) Chiron & Van den Berg
- Acianthera fornograndensis L.Kollmann & A.P.Fontana
- Acianthera freyi (Luer) F.Barros & V.T.Rodrigues
- Acianthera fumioi (T.Hashim.) Luer
- Acianthera garciae (Luer) Pridgeon & M.W.Chase
- Acianthera geminicaulina (Ames) Pridgeon & M.W.Chase
- Acianthera gigantea (Lindl.) A.Doucette
- Acianthera glanduligera (Lindl.) Luer
- Acianthera glumacea (Lindl.) Pridgeon & M.W.Chase
- Acianthera gouveiae (A.Samp.) F.Barros & L.R.S.Guim.
- Acianthera gracilis (Barb.Rodr.) F.Barros & L.R.S.Guim.
- Acianthera gracilisepala (Brade) Luer
- Acianthera gradeae Chiron & Benelli
- Acianthera granitica (Luer & G.A.Romero) Luer
- Acianthera greenwoodii Soto Arenas
- Acianthera hamata Pupulin & G.A.Rojas
- Acianthera hartwegiifolia (H.Wendl. & Kraenzl.) Solano & Soto Arenas
- Acianthera hastulata (Rchb.f. & Warm.) Karremans
- Acianthera hatschbachii (Schltr.) Chiron & Van den Berg
- Acianthera heliconioides (Luer & R.Vásquez) Pridgeon & M.W.Chase
- Acianthera heliconiscapa (Hoehne) F.Barros
- Acianthera henrici (Schltr.) Luer
- Acianthera heringeri (Hoehne) F.Barros
- Acianthera herrerae (Luer) Solano & Soto Arenas
- Acianthera herzogii (Schltr.) Baumbach
- Acianthera heteropetala (Luer) Pridgeon & M.W.Chase
- Acianthera hintonii (L.O.Williams) A.Doucette
- Acianthera hirsutula (Fawc. & Rendle) Pridgeon & M.W.Chase
- Acianthera hirtipes (Schltr.) Rojas-Alv. & Karremans
- Acianthera hirtzii (Luer) Karremans & Rinc.-González
- Acianthera hoffmannseggiana (Rchb.f.) F.Barros
- Acianthera hondurensis (Ames) Pridgeon & M.W.Chase
- Acianthera hygrophila (Barb.Rodr.) Pridgeon & M.W.Chase
- Acianthera hystrix (Kraenzl.) F.Barros
- Acianthera imitator Toscano, Luer & L.Kollmann
- Acianthera inaequalis (Lindl.) F.Barros & L.R.S.Guim.
- Acianthera johannensis (Barb.Rodr.) Pridgeon & M.W.Chase
- Acianthera johnsonii (Ames) Pridgeon & M.W.Chase
- Acianthera jordanensis (Brade) F.Barros
- Acianthera juxtaposita (Luer) Luer
- Acianthera kateora (Garay) Karremans & Rinc.-González
- Acianthera kegelii (Rchb.f.) Luer
- Acianthera klingelfusii Luer, Toscano & Baptista
- Acianthera klotzschiana (Rchb.f.) Pridgeon & M.W.Chase
- Acianthera krahnii Luer & Vásquez
- Acianthera lamia (Luer) Pridgeon & M.W.Chase
- Acianthera langeana (Kraenzl.) Pridgeon & M.W.Chase
- Acianthera lappago (Luer) A.Doucette
- Acianthera laxa (Sw.) A.Doucette
- Acianthera lepidota (L.O.Williams) Pridgeon & M.W.Chase
- Acianthera leptotifolia (Barb.Rodr.) Pridgeon & M.W.Chase
- Acianthera limae (Porto & Brade) Pridgeon & M.W.Chase
- Acianthera litensis (Luer & Hirtz) Luer
- Acianthera lojae (Schltr.) Luer
- Acianthera lueri Kolan. & Szlach.
- Acianthera luteola (Lindl.) Pridgeon & M.W.Chase
- Acianthera macilenta Luer & Hirtz
- Acianthera macropoda (Barb.Rodr.) Pridgeon & M.W.Chase
- Acianthera macuconensis (Barb.Rodr.) F.Barros
- Acianthera maculiglossa Chiron & N.Sanson
- Acianthera madisonii (Luer) Pridgeon & M.W.Chase
- Acianthera magalhanesii (Pabst) F.Barros
- Acianthera majakoluckae Soto Arenas & Solano
- Acianthera malachantha (Rchb.f.) Pridgeon & M.W.Chase
- Acianthera marleniae Damian, Chiron & Mitidieri
- Acianthera marquesii Luer & Toscano
- Acianthera marumbyana (Garay) Luer
- Acianthera melachila (Barb.Rodr.) Luer
- Acianthera melanochthoda (Luer & Hirtz) Pridgeon & M.W.Chase
- Acianthera melanoglossa (Luer & R.Escobar) Luer
- Acianthera mendozae Luer
- Acianthera mexiae (Luer) Pridgeon & M.W.Chase
- Acianthera micrantha (Barb.Rodr.) Pridgeon & M.W.Chase
- Acianthera minima (Cogn.) F.Barros
- Acianthera minuta (Rolfe) Karremans
- Acianthera miqueliana (H.Focke) Pridgeon & M.W.Chase
- Acianthera modestissima (Rchb.f. & Warm.) Pridgeon & M.W.Chase
- Acianthera monophylla (Hook.) Karremans
- Acianthera montana (Barb.Rodr.) F.Barros & L.R.S.Guim.
- Acianthera morenoi (Luer) Pridgeon & M.W.Chase
- Acianthera morilloi (Carnevali & I.Ramírez) Luer
- Acianthera moronae (Luer & Hirtz) Luer
- Acianthera murex (Rchb.f.) Luer
- Acianthera murexoidea (Pabst) Pridgeon & M.W.Chase
- Acianthera muscicola (Barb.Rodr.) Pridgeon & M.W.Chase
- Acianthera muscosa (Barb.Rodr.) Pridgeon & M.W.Chase
- Acianthera myrticola (Barb.Rodr.) F.Barros & L.R.S.Guim.
- Acianthera nellyae (P.Ortiz) Karremans
- Acianthera nemorosa (Barb.Rodr.) F.Barros
- Acianthera nikoleae A.Doucette & J.Portilla
- Acianthera obscura (A.Rich. & Galeotti) Pridgeon & M.W.Chase
- Acianthera ochreata (Lindl.) Pridgeon & M.W.Chase
- Acianthera octophrys (Rchb.f.) Pridgeon & M.W.Chase
- Acianthera odontotepala (Rchb.f.) Luer
- Acianthera ofella (Luer) Pridgeon & M.W.Chase
- Acianthera oligantha (Barb.Rodr.) F.Barros
- Acianthera omissa (Luer) Pridgeon & M.W.Chase
- Acianthera oricola (H.Stenzel) Karremans, Chiron & Van den Berg
- Acianthera oscitans (Ames) Pridgeon & M.W.Chase
- Acianthera pacayana (Schltr.) Solano & Soto Arenas
- Acianthera panduripetala (Barb.Rodr.) Pridgeon & M.W.Chase
- Acianthera pantasmi (Rchb.f.) Pridgeon & M.W.Chase
- Acianthera pantasmoides (C.Schweinf.) Pridgeon & M.W.Chase
- Acianthera papillosa (Lindl.) Pridgeon & M.W.Chase
- Acianthera paradoxa (Luer & Dalström) Karremans
- Acianthera pardipes (Rchb.f.) Pridgeon & M.W.Chase
- Acianthera pariaensis (Carnevali & G.A.Romero) Carnevali & G.A.Romero
- Acianthera parva (Rolfe) F.Barros & L.R.S.Guim.
- Acianthera pavimentata (Rchb.f.) Pridgeon & M.W.Chase
- Acianthera pazii Luer
- Acianthera pectinata (Lindl.) Pridgeon & M.W.Chase
- Acianthera pendens (Dod) A.Doucette
- Acianthera per-dusenii (Hoehne) F.Barros & L.R.S.Guim.
- Acianthera pernambucensis (Rolfe) F.Barros
- Acianthera phoenicoptera (Carnevali & G.A.Romero) Luer
- Acianthera phrynoglossa (Luer & Hirtz) A.Doucette
- Acianthera platystachys (Regel) Chiron & Van den Berg
- Acianthera pollardiana Solano
- Acianthera polystachya (Ruiz & Pav.) Pupulin
- Acianthera portilloi (Luer & R.Escobar) Karremans & Rinc.-González
- Acianthera privigna (Luer) A.Doucette
- Acianthera prognatha (Luer & R.Escobar) Pridgeon & M.W.Chase
- Acianthera prolifera (Herb. ex Lindl.) Pridgeon & M.W.Chase
- Acianthera prostrata (Lindl.) A.Doucette
- Acianthera pubescens (Lindl.) Pridgeon & M.W.Chase
- Acianthera punctatiflora (Luer) Pridgeon & M.W.Chase
- Acianthera punicea (Luer) Pridgeon & M.W.Chase
- Acianthera purpurascens (Luer & Hirtz) Karremans
- Acianthera purpureoviolacea (Cogn.) F.Barros
- Acianthera pustulata Zambrano & Solano
- Acianthera quadricristata (Luer & Hirtz) Luer
- Acianthera quadriserrata (Luer) Pridgeon & M.W.Chase
- Acianthera quisqueyana (Dod) A.Doucette
- Acianthera ramosa (Barb.Rodr.) F.Barros
- Acianthera recurva (Lindl.) Pridgeon & M.W.Chase
- Acianthera rinkei Luer
- Acianthera rodolfovasquezii Damian
- Acianthera rodrigoi (Luer) Luer
- Acianthera rodriguesii (Cogn.) Pridgeon & M.W.Chase
- Acianthera rostellata (Barb.Rodr.) Luer
- Acianthera rubroviridis (Lindl.) Pridgeon & M.W.Chase
- Acianthera ruizii Damian
- Acianthera sandaliorum (G.A.Romero & Carnevali) Luer
- Acianthera saraca-taquerensis Campacci & J.B.F.Silva
- Acianthera sarcosepala (Carnevali & I.Ramírez) Carnevali & G.A.Romero
- Acianthera saundersiana (Rchb.f.) Pridgeon & M.W.Chase
- Acianthera saurocephala (G.Lodd.) Pridgeon & M.W.Chase
- Acianthera scabripes (Lindl.) Karremans
- Acianthera scalpricaulis (Luer) Pridgeon & M.W.Chase
- Acianthera serpentula (Barb.Rodr.) F.Barros
- Acianthera serratifolia Rinc.-González & Karremans
- Acianthera serrulata (Barb.Rodr.) Karremans
- Acianthera serrulatipetala (Barb.Rodr.) Pridgeon & M.W.Chase
- Acianthera sicaria (Lindl.) Pridgeon & M.W.Chase
- Acianthera sicariopsis (Luer) Pridgeon & M.W.Chase
- Acianthera sicula (Luer & R.Vásquez) Luer
- Acianthera sigmoidea (Ames & C.Schweinf.) A.Doucette
- Acianthera silvae (Luer & Toscano) Luer
- Acianthera similis (Schltr.) Karremans, Chiron & Van den Berg
- Acianthera simpliciflora (Dod) A.Doucette
- Acianthera sonderiana (Rchb.f.) Pridgeon & M.W.Chase
- Acianthera sotoana Solano
- Acianthera stenzelii Luer
- Acianthera strupifolia (Lindl.) Pridgeon & M.W.Chase
- Acianthera subrotundifolia (Cogn.) F.Barros & V.T.Rodrigues
- Acianthera sudae J.Ponert, Chumová, Mandáková & P.Trávn.
- Acianthera sulcata (Porsch) F.Barros & V.T.Rodrigues
- Acianthera sulphurea (Barb.Rodr.) F.Barros & V.T.Rodrigues
- Acianthera tanyae Luer & Cornejo
- Acianthera teres (Lindl.) Borba
- Acianthera testifolia (Sw.) Solano
- Acianthera thysana (Luer & J.Portilla) Karremans
- Acianthera tikalensis (Correll & C.Schweinf.) Pridgeon & M.W.Chase
- Acianthera toachica (Luer & Dodson) Luer
- Acianthera tokachii (Luer) Luer
- Acianthera translucida (Barb.Rodr.) Luer
- Acianthera tricarinata (Poepp. & Endl.) Pridgeon & M.W.Chase
- Acianthera trichophora (Lindl.) A.Doucette
- Acianthera tristis (Barb.Rodr.) Pridgeon & M.W.Chase
- Acianthera tunguraguae (F.Lehm. & Kraenzl.) A.Doucette
- Acianthera unguicallosa (Ames & C.Schweinf.) Solano
- Acianthera variegata (Barb.Rodr.) Campacci
- Acianthera venulosa Luer
- Acianthera verecunda (Schltr.) Pridgeon & M.W.Chase
- Acianthera villahermosae Sierra-Ariza, Rinc.-González & Karremans
- Acianthera violacea (A.Rich. & Galeotti) Pridgeon & M.W.Chase
- Acianthera violaceomaculata (Hoehne) Pridgeon & M.W.Chase
- Acianthera viridis (Luer & Hirtz) Luer
- Acianthera wageneriana (Klotzsch) Pridgeon & M.W.Chase
- Acianthera wawraeana (Barb.Rodr.) F.Barros & V.T.Rodrigues
- Acianthera welsiae-windischiae (Pabst) Pridgeon & M.W.Chase
- Acianthera wilsonii (Lindl.) Pridgeon & M.W.Chase
- Acianthera wyvern (Luer & R.Escobar) Pridgeon & M.W.Chase
- Acianthera yauaperyensis (Barb.Rodr.) Pridgeon & M.W.Chase
- Acianthera zumbae (Luer & Hirtz) Luer
