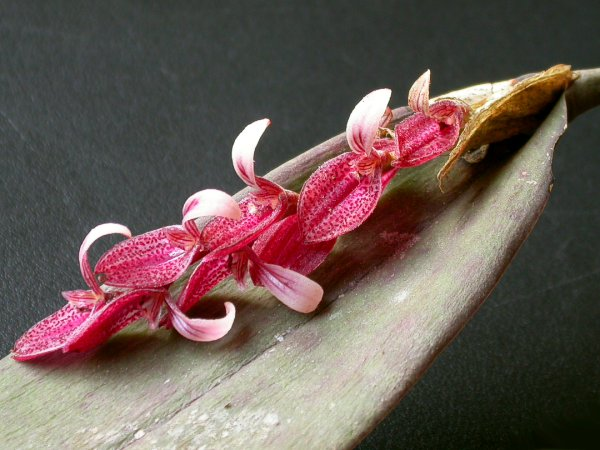

Scientific classification
- Kingdom: Plantae
- Clade: Tracheophytes
- Clade: Angiosperms
- Clade: Monocots
- Order: Asparagales
- Family: Orchidaceae
- Subfamily: Epidendroideae
- Genus: Acianthera
- Species: A. strupifolia

Binomial name
- Acianthera strupifolia (Lindl.) Pridgeon & M.W. Chase (2001)

Synonyms
- Pleurothallis strupifolia Lindl. (1839) (Basionym); Pleurothallis bicolor Lindl. (1842); Pleurothallis hookeri Regel (1881); Humboldtia strupifolia (Lindl.) Kuntze (1891); Restrepia liebmanniana Kraenzl. (1920); Pleurothallis glaucophylla Hoehne (1927)

= Acianthera strupifolia =

Species of orchid

Acianthera strupifolia is a species of orchid.
