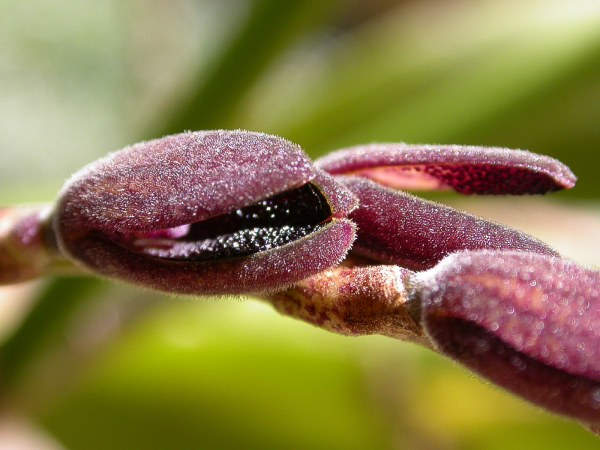

Scientific classification
- Kingdom: Plantae
- Clade: Tracheophytes
- Clade: Angiosperms
- Clade: Monocots
- Order: Asparagales
- Family: Orchidaceae
- Subfamily: Epidendroideae
- Genus: Acianthera
- Species: A. saurocephala

Binomial name
- Acianthera saurocephala (Lodd.) Pridgeon & M.W. Chase (2001)

Synonyms
- Pleurothallis saurocephala Lodd. (1830) (Basionym); Humboldtia saurocephala (Lodd.) Kuntze (1891)

= Acianthera saurocephala =

Species of orchid

Acianthera saurocephala is a species of orchid.
