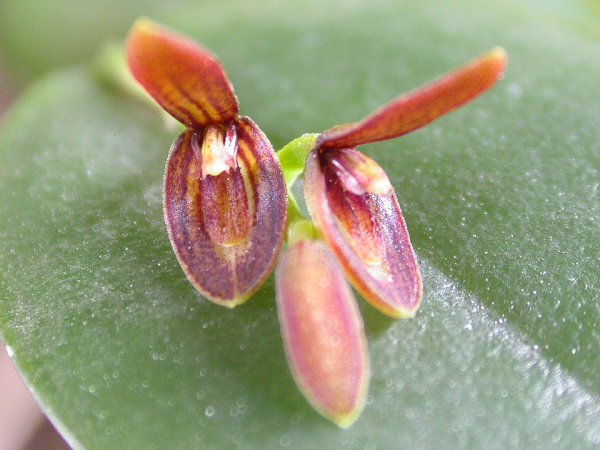

Scientific classification
- Kingdom: Plantae
- Clade: Embryophytes
- Clade: Tracheophytes
- Clade: Angiosperms
- Clade: Monocots
- Order: Asparagales
- Family: Orchidaceae
- Subfamily: Epidendroideae
- Genus: Acianthera
- Species: A. micrantha

Binomial name
- Acianthera micrantha (Barb.Rodr.) Pridgeon & M.W. Chase (2001)

Synonyms
- Pleurothallis micrantha Barb.Rodr. (1881) (basionym)

= Acianthera micrantha =

Species of orchid

Acianthera micrantha is a species of orchid.
