= Acianthera capillaris =

Scientific classification
- Kingdom: Plantae
- Clade: Tracheophytes
- Clade: Angiosperms
- Clade: Monocots
- Order: Asparagales
- Family: Orchidaceae
- Subfamily: Epidendroideae
- Genus: Acianthera
- Species: A. capillaris

Binomial name
- Acianthera capillaris (Lindl.) Pridgeon & M.W.Chase

Synonyms
- Acianthera floribunda (Lindl.) F.Barros; Acianthera longicaulis (Lindl.) Pridgeon & M.W.Chase; Acianthera sieberi (Luer) Pridgeon & M.W.Chase; Arthrosia capillaris (Lindl.) Campacci; Arthrosia floribunda (Lindl.) Luer; Arthrosia longicaulis (Lindl.) Campacci; Humboltia capillaris (Lindl.) Kuntze; Humboltia longicaulis (Lindl.) Kuntze; Pleurothallis capillaris Lindl.; Pleurothallis floribunda (Lindl.) Lindl.; Pleurothallis longicaulis Lindl.; Pleurothallis sieberi Luer; Specklinia capillaris (Lindl.) Luer; Specklinia floribunda Lindl.; Specklinia longicaulis (Lindl.) Luer; Specklinia ophioglossoides Mutel

Species of orchid

Acianthera capillaris is a species of orchid plant native to Bolivia, Brazil, Colombia, Ecuador, Paraguay, Venezuela, the Venezuelan Antilles, and the Windward Islands.
