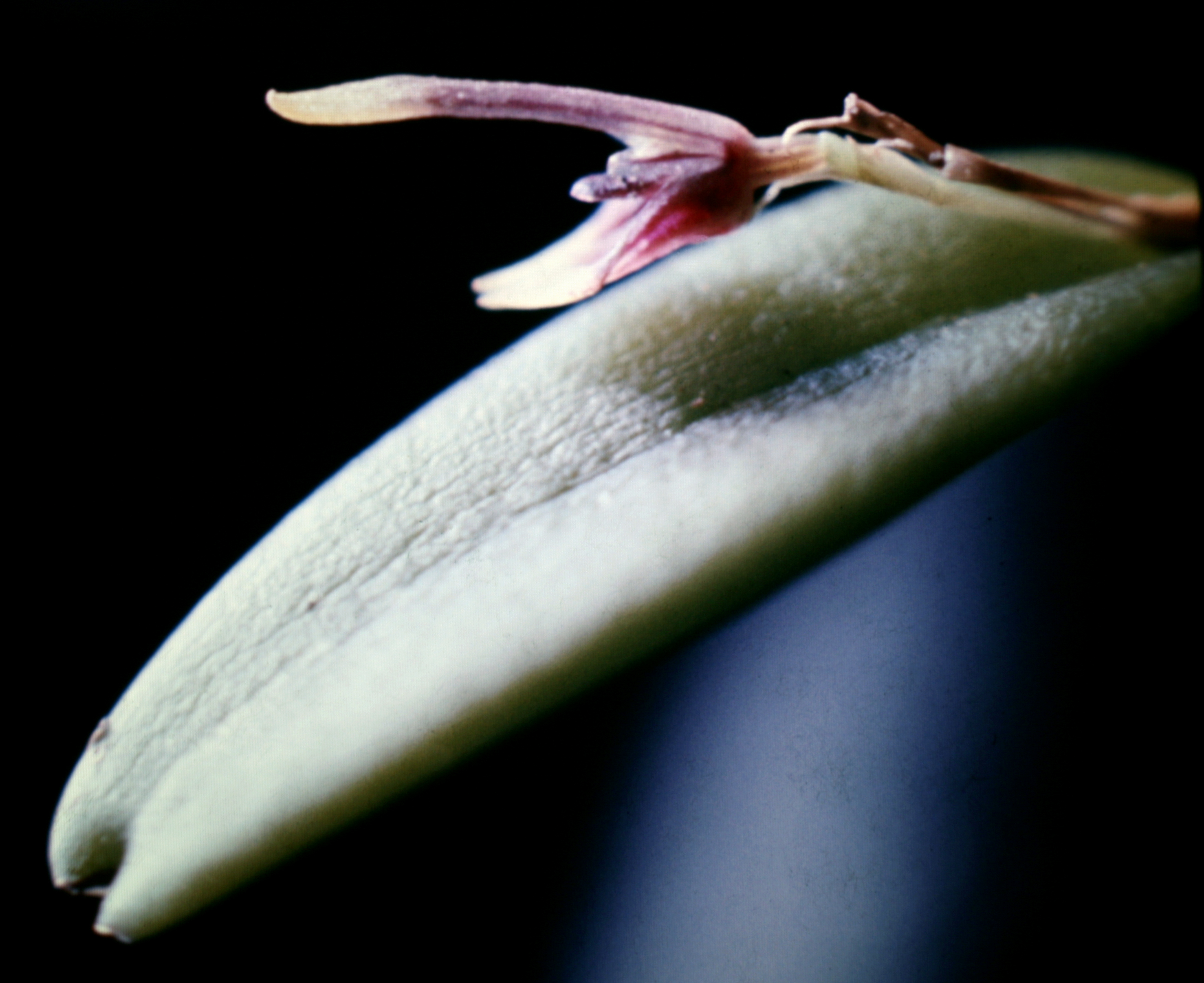

Scientific classification
- Kingdom: Plantae
- Clade: Tracheophytes
- Clade: Angiosperms
- Clade: Monocots
- Order: Asparagales
- Family: Orchidaceae
- Subfamily: Epidendroideae
- Genus: Acianthera
- Species: A. miqueliana

Binomial name
- Acianthera miqueliana (H. Focke) Pridgeon & M.W. Chase (2001)

Synonyms
- Specklinia miqueliana H. Focke (1849) (Basionym); Pleurothallis miqueliana (H. Focke) Lindl. (1859); Stelis miqueliana (H. Focke) Lindl. (1859); Pleurothallis fimbriata Lindl. (1859); Humboldtia fimbriata (Lindl.) Kuntze (1891); Humboldtia miqueliana (H. Focke) Kuntze (1891); Pleurothallis longisepala Barb.Rodr. (1891)

= Acianthera miqueliana =

Species of orchid

Acianthera miqueliana is a species of orchid.
