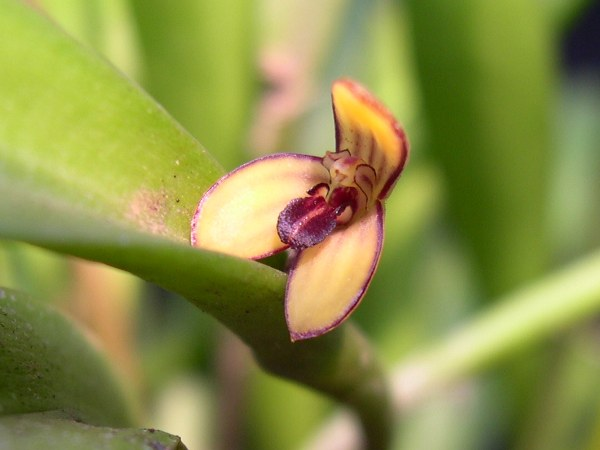

Scientific classification
- Kingdom: Plantae
- Clade: Tracheophytes
- Clade: Angiosperms
- Clade: Monocots
- Order: Asparagales
- Family: Orchidaceae
- Subfamily: Epidendroideae
- Genus: Acianthera
- Species: A. wageneriana

Binomial name
- Acianthera wageneriana (Klotzsch) Pridgeon & M.W.Chase

Synonyms
- Pleurothallis wageneriana Klotzsch; Pleurothallis xylobiochila Kraenzl.

= Acianthera wageneriana =

Species of plant

Acianthera wageneriana is a species of orchid plant native to Bolivia, Brazil South, Colombia, Ecuador, Peru, Venezuela.
