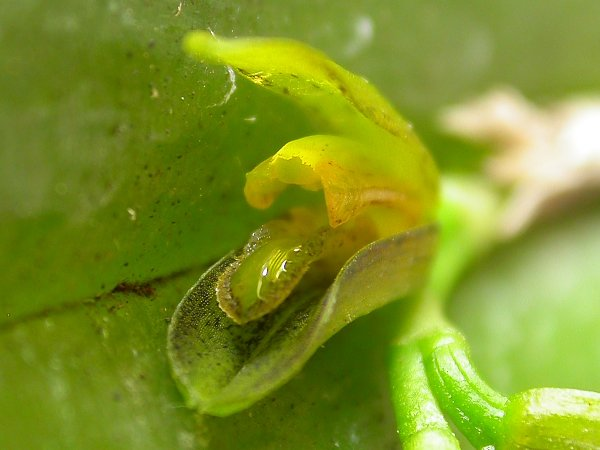

Scientific classification
- Kingdom: Plantae
- Clade: Embryophytes
- Clade: Tracheophytes
- Clade: Angiosperms
- Clade: Monocots
- Order: Asparagales
- Family: Orchidaceae
- Subfamily: Epidendroideae
- Genus: Acianthera
- Species: A. heringeri

Binomial name
- Acianthera heringeri (Hoehne) F. Barros (2003)

Synonyms
- Pleurothallis heringeri Hoehne (1946) (Basionym)

= Acianthera heringeri =

Species of orchid

Acianthera heringeri is a species of orchid.
