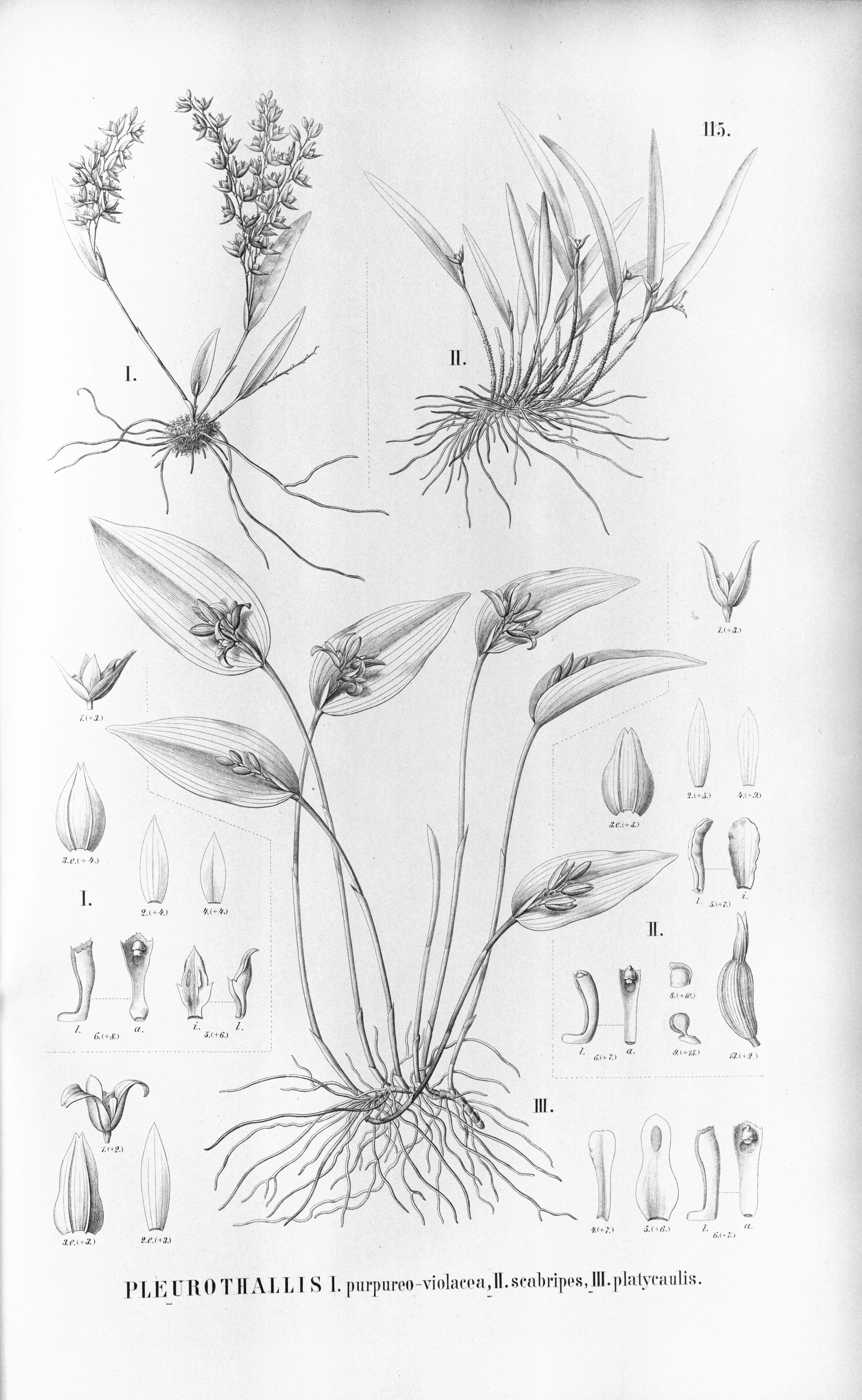

Scientific classification
- Kingdom: Plantae
- Clade: Tracheophytes
- Clade: Angiosperms
- Clade: Monocots
- Order: Asparagales
- Family: Orchidaceae
- Subfamily: Epidendroideae
- Genus: Acianthera
- Species: A. scabripes

Binomial name
- Acianthera scabripes (Lindl.) Karremans

Synonyms
- Pleurothallis scabripes Lindl.

= Acianthera scabripes =

Species of orchid

Acianthera scabripes is a species of orchid plant.
