= Acianthera toachica =

Scientific classification
- Kingdom: Plantae
- Clade: Tracheophytes
- Clade: Angiosperms
- Clade: Monocots
- Order: Asparagales
- Family: Orchidaceae
- Subfamily: Epidendroideae
- Genus: Acianthera
- Species: A. toachica

Binomial name
- Acianthera toachica (Luer & Dodson) Luer

Synonyms
- Pleurothallis toachica Luer & Dodson

Species of plant

Acianthera toachica is a species of orchid plant native to Peru.
