= Acianthera bahorucensis =

Scientific classification
- Kingdom: Plantae
- Clade: Tracheophytes
- Clade: Angiosperms
- Clade: Monocots
- Order: Asparagales
- Family: Orchidaceae
- Subfamily: Epidendroideae
- Genus: Acianthera
- Species: A. bahorucensis

Binomial name
- Acianthera bahorucensis (Luer) A.Doucette

Synonyms
- Pleurothallis bahorucensis Luer

Species of orchid

Acianthera bahorucensis is a species of orchid plant native to the Dominican Republic.
