= Acianthera juxtaposita =

Scientific classification
- Kingdom: Plantae
- Clade: Tracheophytes
- Clade: Angiosperms
- Clade: Monocots
- Order: Asparagales
- Family: Orchidaceae
- Subfamily: Epidendroideae
- Genus: Acianthera
- Species: A. juxtaposita

Binomial name
- Acianthera juxtaposita (Luer) Luer

Synonyms
- Pleurothallis juxtaposita Luer

Species of plant

Acianthera juxtaposita is a species of orchid plant native to Panama.
