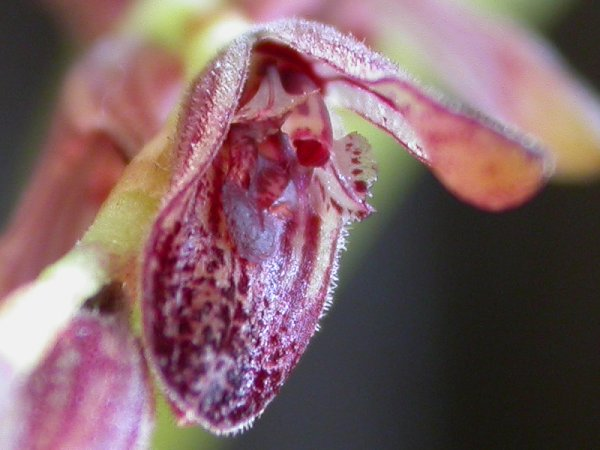

Scientific classification
- Kingdom: Plantae
- Clade: Tracheophytes
- Clade: Angiosperms
- Clade: Monocots
- Order: Asparagales
- Family: Orchidaceae
- Subfamily: Epidendroideae
- Genus: Acianthera
- Species: A. pubescens

Binomial name
- Acianthera pubescens (Lindl.) Pridgeon & M.W. Chase (2001)

Synonyms
- Pleurothallis pubescens Lindl. (1836) (Basionym); Humboldtia bufonis (Klotzsch) Kuntze (1891); Humboldtia pubescens (Lindl.) Kuntze (1891); Humboldtia smithiana (Lindl.) Kuntze (1891); Humboldtia truxillensis (Rchb.f.) Kuntze (1891); Humboldtia vittata (Lindl.) Kuntze (1891); Pleurothallis bourgeaui Kraenzl. (1921); Pleurothallis bufonis Klotzsch (1854); Pleurothallis coriacea Bello (1883); Pleurothallis janeirensis Barb.Rodr. (1881); Pleurothallis janeirensis var. viridicata Barb.Rodr. (1882); Pleurothallis mandibularis Kraenzl. (1920); Pleurothallis picta Hook. (1841); Pleurothallis polystachya A. Rich. & Galeotti (1845); Pleurothallis porphyrantha Kraenzl. (1921); Pleurothallis pubescens Lindl. (1836); Pleurothallis rio-grandensis Barb.Rodr. (1881); Pleurothallis rio-grandensis var. longicaulis Cogn. (1896); Pleurothallis rio-grandensis var. viridicata Barb.Rodr. (1881); Pleurothallis smithiana Lindl. (1843); Pleurothallis smithiana var. viridicata Cogn. (1896); Pleurothallis truxillensis Rchb.f. (1854); Pleurothallis vittata Lindl. (1838)

= Acianthera pubescens =

Species of orchid

Acianthera pubescens is a species of orchid.
