= Acianthera quadriserrata =

Scientific classification
- Kingdom: Plantae
- Clade: Tracheophytes
- Clade: Angiosperms
- Clade: Monocots
- Order: Asparagales
- Family: Orchidaceae
- Subfamily: Epidendroideae
- Genus: Acianthera
- Species: A. quadriserrata

Binomial name
- Acianthera quadriserrata (Luer) Pridgeon & M.W.Chase

Synonyms
- Pleurothallis quadriserrata Luer

Species of plant

Acianthera quadriserrata is a species of orchid plant native to Ecuador .
