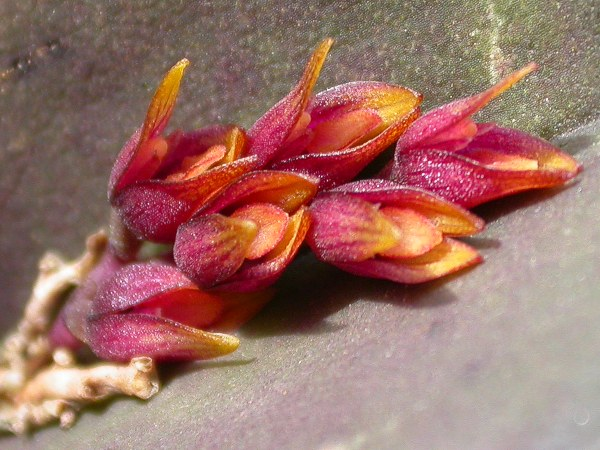

Scientific classification
- Kingdom: Plantae
- Clade: Tracheophytes
- Clade: Angiosperms
- Clade: Monocots
- Order: Asparagales
- Family: Orchidaceae
- Subfamily: Epidendroideae
- Genus: Acianthera
- Species: A. prolifera

Binomial name
- Acianthera prolifera (Herb. ex Lindl.) Pridgeon & M.W. Chase (2001)

Synonyms
- Pleurothallis prolifera Herb. ex Lindl. (1829) (Basionym); Pleurothallis hamosa Barb.Rodr. (1881); Humboldtia prolifera (Herb. ex Lindl.) Kuntze (1891); Pleurothallis hamosa var. longicaulis Cogn. (1906); Pleurothallis lithophila Barb.Rodr. (1907); Acianthera hamosa (Barb.Rodr.) Pridgeon & M.W. Chase (2001)

= Acianthera prolifera =

Species of orchid

Acianthera prolifera is a species of orchid.

It is native to the Atlantic Forest ecoregion in southeastern Brazil.
