= Acianthera viridis =

Scientific classification
- Kingdom: Plantae
- Clade: Tracheophytes
- Clade: Angiosperms
- Clade: Monocots
- Order: Asparagales
- Family: Orchidaceae
- Subfamily: Epidendroideae
- Genus: Acianthera
- Species: A. viridis

Binomial name
- Acianthera viridis (Luer & Hirtz) Luer

Synonyms
- Pleurothallis viridis Luer & Hirtz

Species of plant

Acianthera viridis is a species of orchid plant native to Ecuador.
