= Acianthera fumioi =

Scientific classification
- Kingdom: Plantae
- Clade: Tracheophytes
- Clade: Angiosperms
- Clade: Monocots
- Order: Asparagales
- Family: Orchidaceae
- Subfamily: Epidendroideae
- Genus: Acianthera
- Species: A. fumioi

Binomial name
- Acianthera fumioi (T.Hashim.) Luer

Synonyms
- Pleurothallis fumioi T.Hashim.

Species of plant

Acianthera fumioi is a species of orchid plant native to Peru.
