= Acianthera violaceomaculata =

Scientific classification
- Kingdom: Plantae
- Clade: Tracheophytes
- Clade: Angiosperms
- Clade: Monocots
- Order: Asparagales
- Family: Orchidaceae
- Subfamily: Epidendroideae
- Genus: Acianthera
- Species: A. violaceomaculata

Binomial name
- Acianthera violaceomaculata (Hoehne) Pridgeon & M.W.Chase

Synonyms
- Pleurothallis violaceomaculata Hoehne

Species of plant

Acianthera violaceomaculata is a species of orchid plant native to Brazil.
