= Acianthera quadricristata =

Scientific classification
- Kingdom: Plantae
- Clade: Tracheophytes
- Clade: Angiosperms
- Clade: Monocots
- Order: Asparagales
- Family: Orchidaceae
- Subfamily: Epidendroideae
- Genus: Acianthera
- Species: A. quadricristata

Binomial name
- Acianthera quadricristata (Luer & Hirtz) Luer

Synonyms
- Pleurothallis quadricristata Luer & Hirtz

Species of plant

Acianthera quadricristata is a species of orchid plant native to Ecuador.
