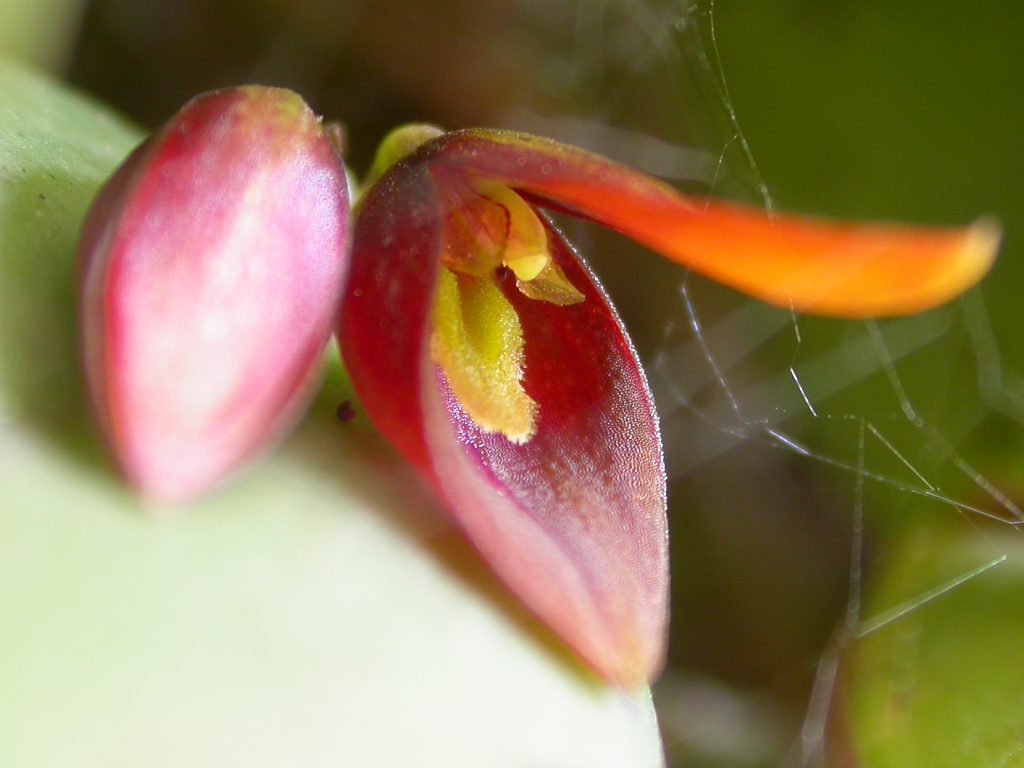

Scientific classification
- Kingdom: Plantae
- Clade: Tracheophytes
- Clade: Angiosperms
- Clade: Monocots
- Order: Asparagales
- Family: Orchidaceae
- Subfamily: Epidendroideae
- Genus: Acianthera
- Species: A. bidentula

Binomial name
- Acianthera bidentula (Barb.Rodr.) Pridgeon & M.W. Chase (2001)

Synonyms
- Pleurothallis bidentula Barb.Rodr. (1881) (Basionym); Pleurothallis vinosa Hoehne & Schltr. (1926)

= Acianthera bidentula =

Species of orchid

Acianthera bidentula is a species of orchid.
