= Acianthera decipiens =

Scientific classification
- Kingdom: Plantae
- Clade: Tracheophytes
- Clade: Angiosperms
- Clade: Monocots
- Order: Asparagales
- Family: Orchidaceae
- Subfamily: Epidendroideae
- Genus: Acianthera
- Species: A. decipiens

Binomial name
- Acianthera decipiens (Ames & C.Schweinf.) Pridgeon & M.W.Chase

Synonyms
- Pleurothallis decipiens Ames & C.Schweinf.

Species of orchid

Acianthera decipiens is a species of orchid plant native to Costa Rica .
