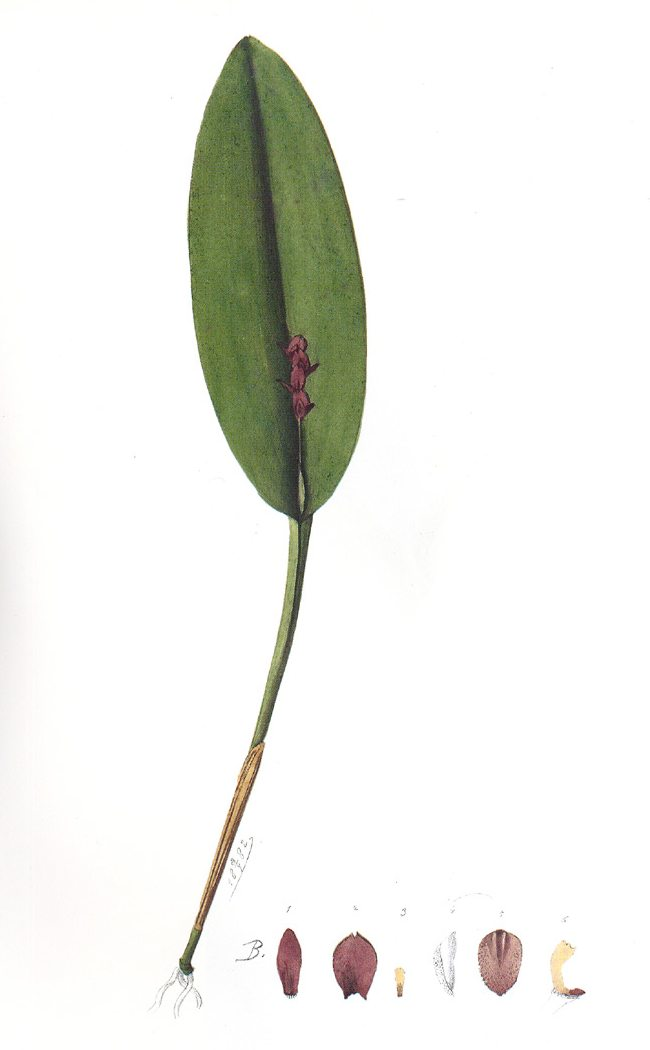

Scientific classification
- Kingdom: Plantae
- Clade: Tracheophytes
- Clade: Angiosperms
- Clade: Monocots
- Order: Asparagales
- Family: Orchidaceae
- Subfamily: Epidendroideae
- Genus: Acianthera
- Species: A. tristis

Binomial name
- Acianthera tristis (Barb.Rodr.) Pridgeon & M.W.Chase

Synonyms
- Pleurothallis tristis Barb.Rodr.

= Acianthera tristis =

Species of plant

Acianthera tristis is a species of orchid plant native to Brazil.

Synonyms of Acianthera tristis are.

Basionym
