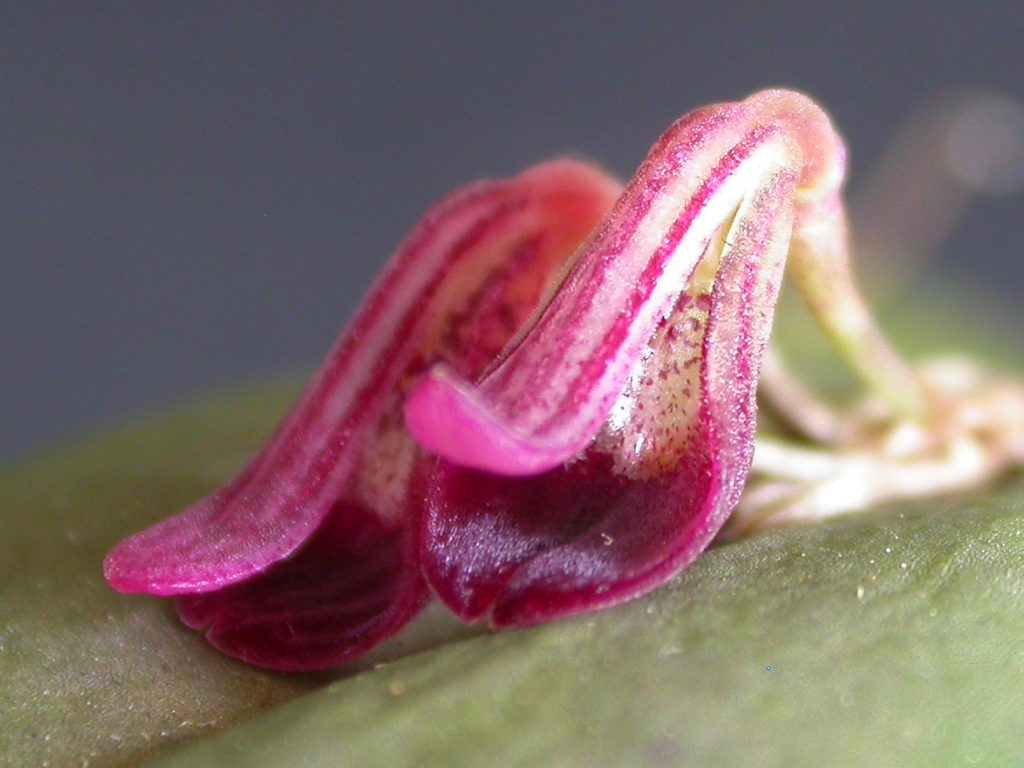

Scientific classification
- Kingdom: Plantae
- Clade: Tracheophytes
- Clade: Angiosperms
- Clade: Monocots
- Order: Asparagales
- Family: Orchidaceae
- Subfamily: Epidendroideae
- Genus: Acianthera
- Species: A. panduripetala

Binomial name
- Acianthera panduripetala (Barb.Rodr.) Pridgeon & M.W. Chase (2001)

Synonyms
- Pleurothallis bidentula Barb.Rodr. (1881) (Basionym); Pleurothallis kraenzliniana Cogn. (1896); Pleurothallis panduripetala var. minor Hoehne (1930)

= Acianthera panduripetala =

Species of orchid

Acianthera panduripetala is a species of orchid.
