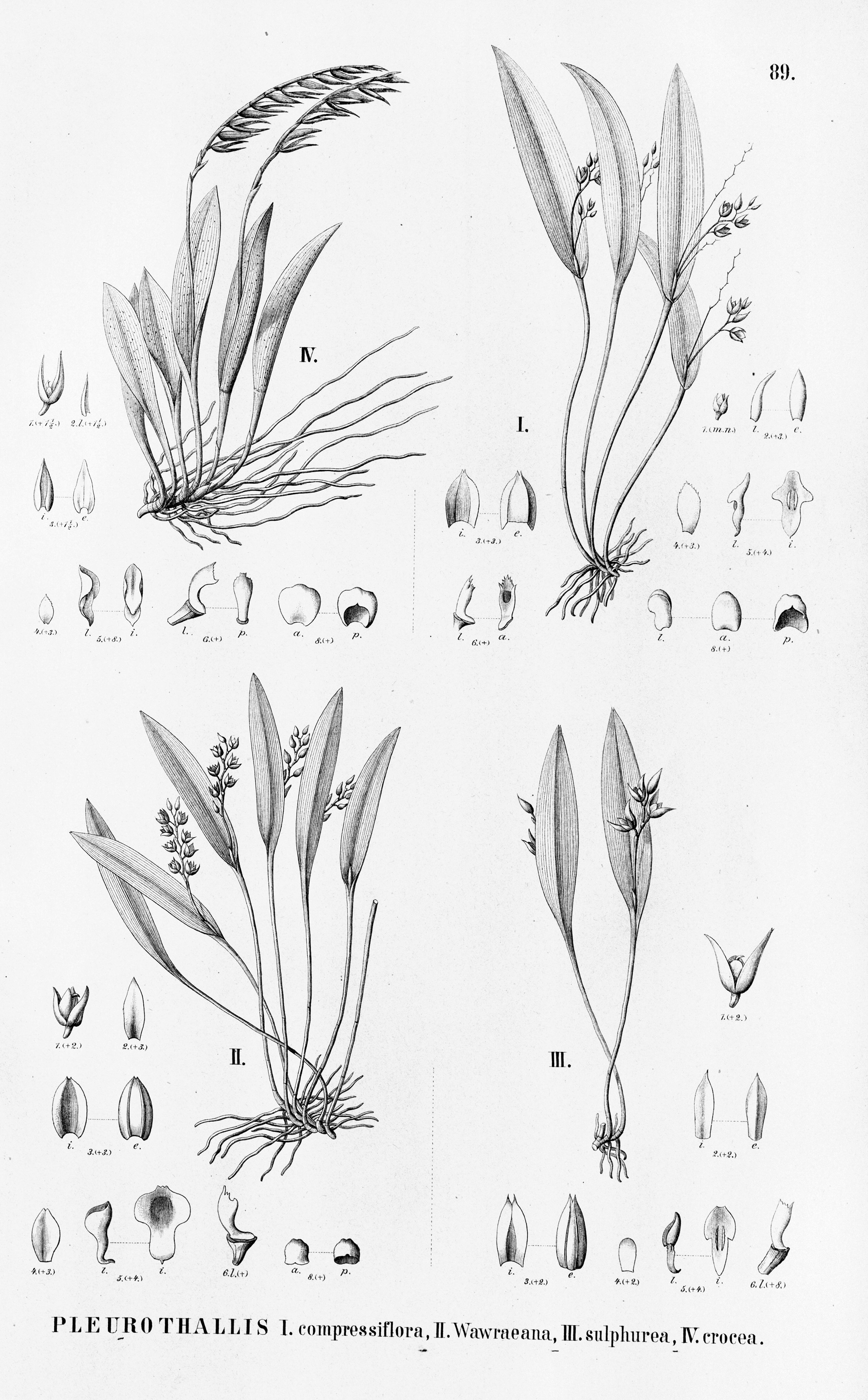

Scientific classification
- Kingdom: Plantae
- Clade: Tracheophytes
- Clade: Angiosperms
- Clade: Monocots
- Order: Asparagales
- Family: Orchidaceae
- Subfamily: Epidendroideae
- Genus: Acianthera
- Species: A. sulphurea

Binomial name
- Acianthera sulphurea (Barb.Rodr.) F.Barros & V.T.Rodrigues

Synonyms
- Pleurothallis sulphurea Barb.Rodr.

= Acianthera sulphurea =

Species of plant

Acianthera sulphurea is a species of orchid plant native to Brazil.
