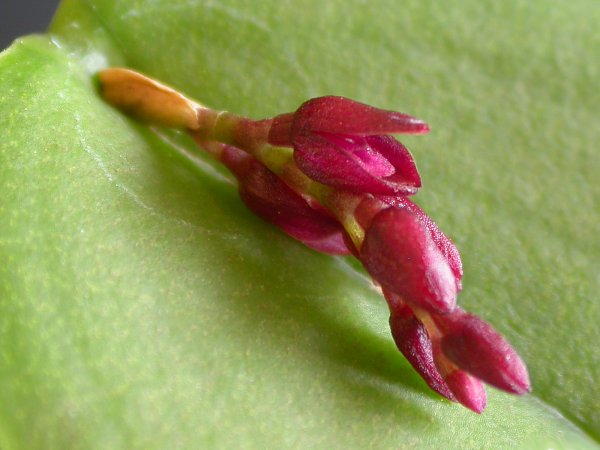

Scientific classification
- Kingdom: Plantae
- Clade: Tracheophytes
- Clade: Angiosperms
- Clade: Monocots
- Order: Asparagales
- Family: Orchidaceae
- Subfamily: Epidendroideae
- Genus: Acianthera
- Species: A. modestissima

Binomial name
- Acianthera modestissima (Rchb.f. & Warm.) Pridgeon & M.W. Chase (2001)

Synonyms
- Pleurothallis modestissima Rchb.f. & Warm. (1881) (Basionym); Humboldtia modestissima (Rchb.f. & Warm.) (1891)

= Acianthera modestissima =

Species of orchid

Acianthera modestissima is a species of orchid. The flower is magenta in color and is very small.
