= Acianthera cerberus =

Scientific classification
- Kingdom: Plantae
- Clade: Tracheophytes
- Clade: Angiosperms
- Clade: Monocots
- Order: Asparagales
- Family: Orchidaceae
- Subfamily: Epidendroideae
- Genus: Acianthera
- Species: A. cerberus

Binomial name
- Acianthera cerberus (Luer & R.Vásquez) Pridgeon & M.W.Chase

Synonyms
- Pleurothallis cerberus Luer & R.Vásquez

Species of plant

Acianthera cerberus is a species of orchid plant native to Bolivia.
