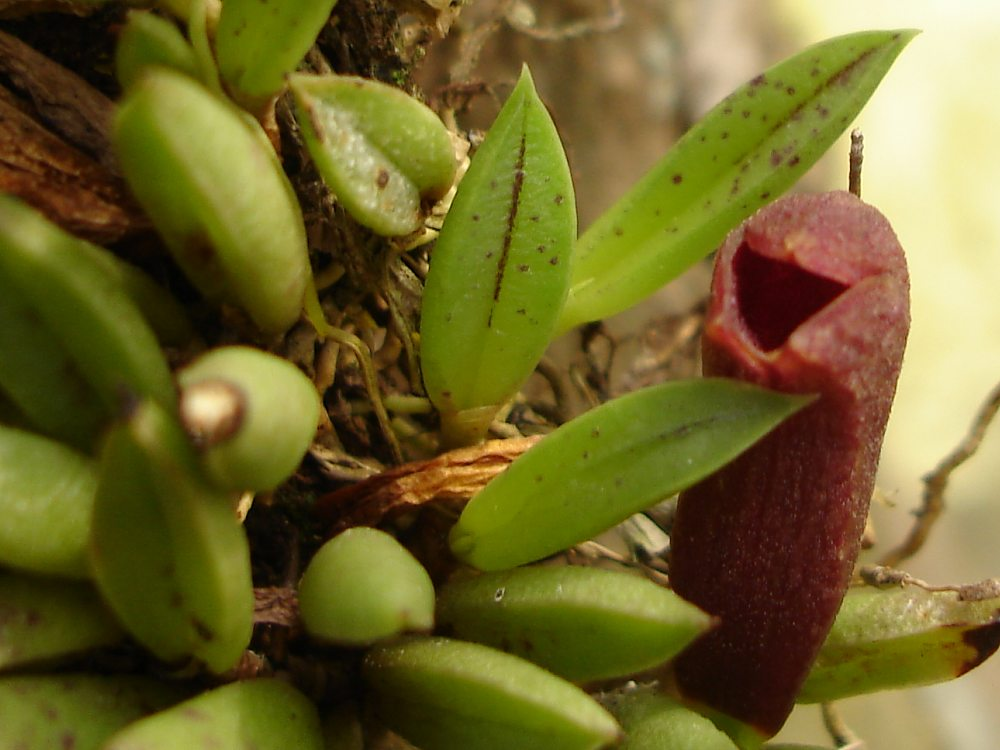

Scientific classification
- Kingdom: Plantae
- Clade: Tracheophytes
- Clade: Angiosperms
- Clade: Monocots
- Order: Asparagales
- Family: Orchidaceae
- Subfamily: Epidendroideae
- Genus: Acianthera
- Species: A. asaroides

Binomial name
- Acianthera asaroides (Kraenzl.) Pridgeon & M.W.Chase

Synonyms
- Pleurothallis asaroides (Kraenzl.) Luer

= Acianthera asaroides =

Species of orchid

Acianthera asaroides is a species of orchid plant.
