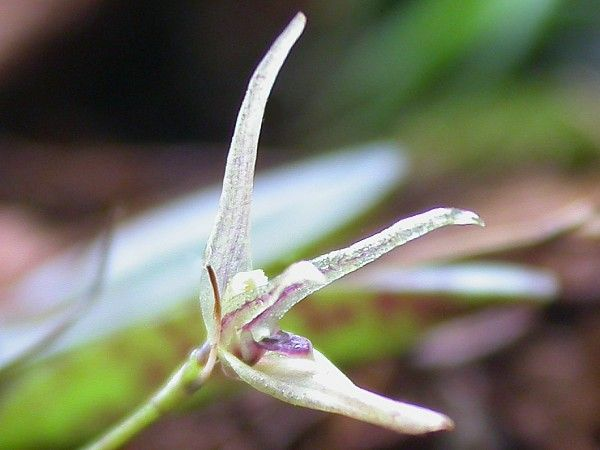

Scientific classification
- Kingdom: Plantae
- Clade: Tracheophytes
- Clade: Angiosperms
- Clade: Monocots
- Order: Asparagales
- Family: Orchidaceae
- Subfamily: Epidendroideae
- Genus: Acianthera
- Species: A. duartei

Binomial name
- Acianthera duartei (Hoehne) Pridgeon & M.W. Chase (2001)

Synonyms
- Pleurothallis duartei Hoehne (1929) (Basionym); Specklinia duartei (Hoehne) Luer (2004); Arthrosia duartei (Hoehne) Luer (2006)

= Acianthera duartei =

Species of orchid

Acianthera duartei is a species of orchid. It is found in Brazil.
