= Acianthera chamelopoda =

Scientific classification
- Kingdom: Plantae
- Clade: Tracheophytes
- Clade: Angiosperms
- Clade: Monocots
- Order: Asparagales
- Family: Orchidaceae
- Subfamily: Epidendroideae
- Genus: Acianthera
- Species: A. chamelopoda

Binomial name
- Acianthera chamelopoda (Luer) Luer

Synonyms
- Pleurothallis chamelopoda Luer

Species of plant

Acianthera chamelopoda is a species of orchid plant native to Colombia.
