= Acianthera brachiloba =

Scientific classification
- Kingdom: Plantae
- Clade: Tracheophytes
- Clade: Angiosperms
- Clade: Monocots
- Order: Asparagales
- Family: Orchidaceae
- Subfamily: Epidendroideae
- Genus: Acianthera
- Species: A. brachiloba

Binomial name
- Acianthera brachiloba (Hoehne) Pridgeon & M.W.Chase

Synonyms
- Pleurothallis brachiloba Hoehne

Species of orchid

Acianthera brachiloba is a species of orchid plant native to Brazil.
