= Acianthera boliviana =

Scientific classification
- Kingdom: Plantae
- Clade: Tracheophytes
- Clade: Angiosperms
- Clade: Monocots
- Order: Asparagales
- Family: Orchidaceae
- Subfamily: Epidendroideae
- Genus: Acianthera
- Species: A. boliviana

Binomial name
- Acianthera boliviana (Rchb.f.) Pridgeon & M.W.Chase

Synonyms
- Pleurothallis boliviana Rchb.f.

Species of orchid

Acianthera boliviana is a species of orchid plant native to Bolivia.
