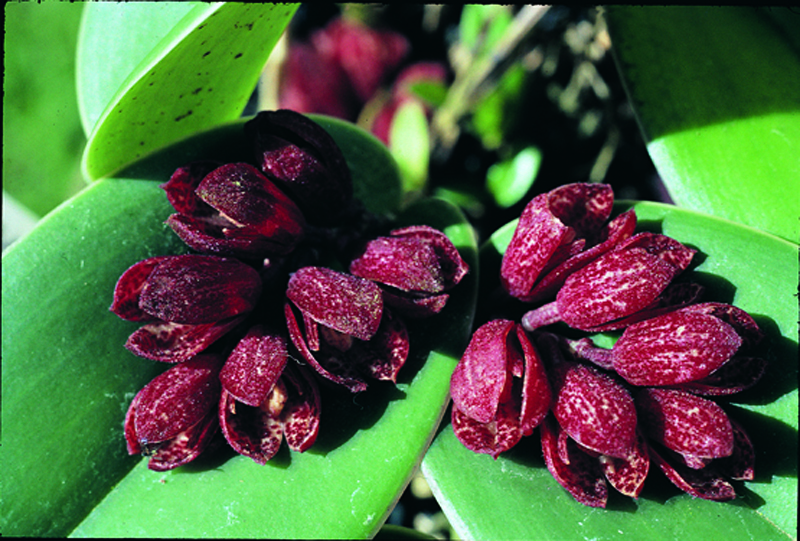

Scientific classification
- Kingdom: Plantae
- Clade: Tracheophytes
- Clade: Angiosperms
- Clade: Monocots
- Order: Asparagales
- Family: Orchidaceae
- Subfamily: Epidendroideae
- Genus: Acianthera
- Species: A. johnsonii

Binomial name
- Acianthera johnsonii (Ames) Pridgeon & M.W.Chase

Synonyms
- Pleurothallis johnsonii Ames

= Acianthera johnsonii =

Species of plant

Acianthera johnsonii is a species of orchid plant native to Belize and Guatemala.
