= Acianthera atroglossa =

Scientific classification
- Kingdom: Plantae
- Clade: Tracheophytes
- Clade: Angiosperms
- Clade: Monocots
- Order: Asparagales
- Family: Orchidaceae
- Subfamily: Epidendroideae
- Genus: Acianthera
- Species: A. atroglossa

Binomial name
- Acianthera atroglossa (Loefgr.) F.Barros & L.R.S.Guim.

Synonyms
- Pleurothallis atroglossa Loefgr.

Species of orchid

Acianthera atroglossa is a species of orchid plant native to Brazil.
