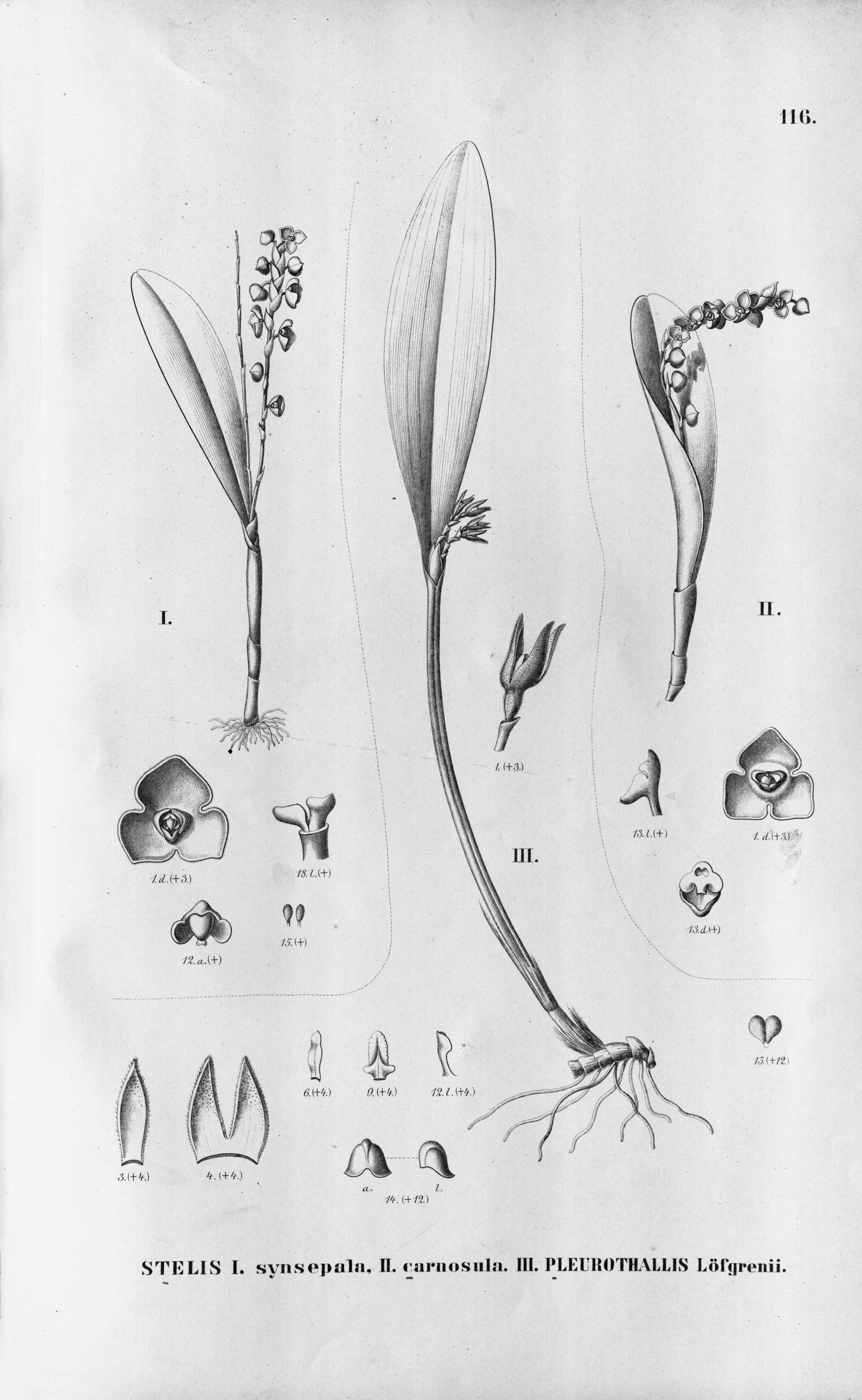
- Illustrations of various parts of Acianthera hoffmannseggiana

Scientific classification
- Kingdom: Plantae
- Clade: Tracheophytes
- Clade: Angiosperms
- Clade: Monocots
- Order: Asparagales
- Family: Orchidaceae
- Subfamily: Epidendroideae
- Genus: Acianthera
- Species: A. hoffmannseggiana

Binomial name
- Acianthera hoffmannseggiana (Rchb.f.) F. Barros (2003)

Synonyms
- Pleurothallis hoffmannseggiana Rchb.f. (1850) (Basionym); Humboldtia hoffmannseggiana (Rchb.f.) Kuntze (1891); Pleurothallis loefgrenii Cogn. (1906)

= Acianthera hoffmannseggiana =

Species of orchid

Acianthera hoffmannseggiana is a species of orchid.
