= Acianthera bidentata =

Scientific classification
- Kingdom: Plantae
- Clade: Tracheophytes
- Clade: Angiosperms
- Clade: Monocots
- Order: Asparagales
- Family: Orchidaceae
- Subfamily: Epidendroideae
- Genus: Acianthera
- Species: A. bidentata

Binomial name
- Acianthera bidentata (Lindl.) F.Barros & V.T.Rodrigues

Synonyms
- Pleurothallis bidentata Lindl.; Humboltia bidentata Lindl. Kuntze

Species of orchid

Acianthera bidentata is a species of orchid plant native to southeast Brazil. It is synonymous with Pleurothallis bidentata and Humboltia bidentata
