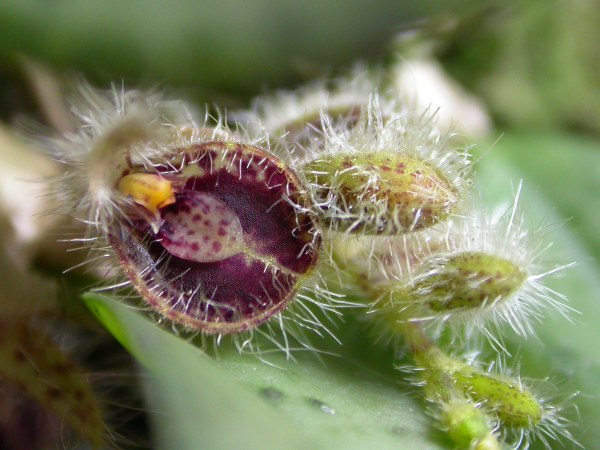

Scientific classification
- Kingdom: Plantae
- Clade: Tracheophytes
- Clade: Angiosperms
- Clade: Monocots
- Order: Asparagales
- Family: Orchidaceae
- Subfamily: Epidendroideae
- Genus: Acianthera
- Species: A. crinita

Binomial name
- Acianthera crinita (Barb.Rodr.) Pridgeon & M.W. Chase (2001)

Synonyms
- Pleurothallis crinita Barb.Rodr. (1877) (Basionym); Lepanthes crinita (Barb.Rodr.) Barb.Rodr. (1881); Lepanthes renipetala Barb.Rodr. (1881); Pleurothallis renipetala (Barb.Rodr.) Cogn. (1896); Pleurothallis renipetala var. grandifolia Cogn. (1896); Pleurothallis renipetala var. intermedia Cogn. (1896); Cryptophoranthus kautskyi Pabst (1976); Specklinia crinita (Barb.Rodr.) F. Barros (1983); Acianthera renipetala (Barb.Rodr.) Luer (2004)

= Acianthera crinita =

Species of orchid

Acianthera crinita is a species of orchid.
