= Acianthera brunnescens =

Scientific classification
- Kingdom: Plantae
- Clade: Tracheophytes
- Clade: Angiosperms
- Clade: Monocots
- Order: Asparagales
- Family: Orchidaceae
- Subfamily: Epidendroideae
- Genus: Acianthera
- Species: A. brunnescens

Binomial name
- Acianthera brunnescens (Schltr.) Karremans

Synonyms
- Pleurothallis brunnescens Schltr.

Species of plant

Acianthera brunnescens is a species of orchid plant native to Costa Rica.
