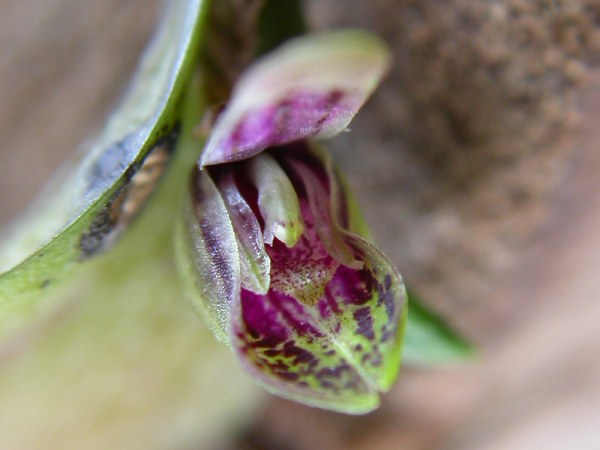

Scientific classification
- Kingdom: Plantae
- Clade: Tracheophytes
- Clade: Angiosperms
- Clade: Monocots
- Order: Asparagales
- Family: Orchidaceae
- Subfamily: Epidendroideae
- Genus: Acianthera
- Species: A. yauaperyensis

Binomial name
- Acianthera yauaperyensis (Barb.Rodr.) Pridgeon & M.W. Chase (2001)

Synonyms
- Pleurothallis yauaperyensis Barb.Rodr. (1891) (Basionym); Pleurothallis consimilis Ames (1922); Acianthera consimilis (Ames) Pridgeon & M.W. Chase (2001)

= Acianthera yauaperyensis =

Species of orchid

Acianthera yauaperyensis is a species of orchid.
