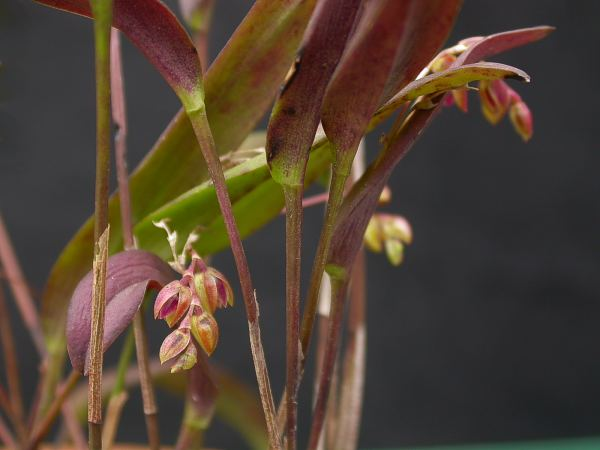

Scientific classification
- Kingdom: Plantae
- Clade: Tracheophytes
- Clade: Angiosperms
- Clade: Monocots
- Order: Asparagales
- Family: Orchidaceae
- Subfamily: Epidendroideae
- Genus: Pleurothallis
- Species: P. auriculata

Binomial name
- Pleurothallis auriculata (Lindl.) Pridgeon & M.W.Chase

Synonyms
- Pleurothallis auriculata Lindl.

= Acianthera auriculata =

Species of orchid

Acianthera auriculata is a species of orchid plant native to Brazil.
