= Charlotte M. Taylor =

U.S. botanist

Charlotte M. Taylor PhD
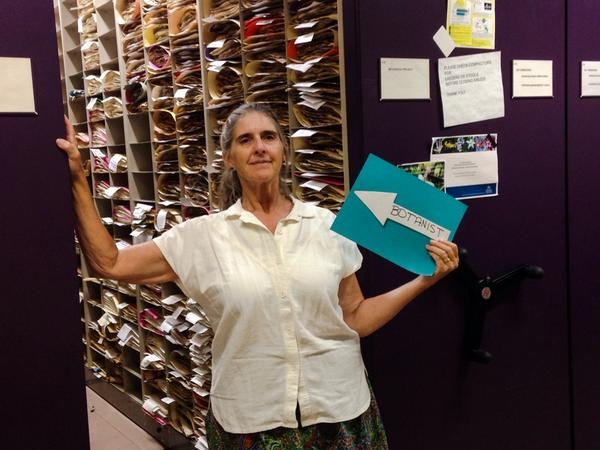
- Dr. Taylor in the Rubiaceae collections of Herbarium at the Missouri Botanical Garden
- Born: 1955; Michigan
- Other names: Charlotte Morley Taylor
- Education: University of Michigan, Duke University
- Scientific career
- Fields: Botany, Systematics, Floristics, Taxonomy
- Institutions: Missouri Botanical Garden, University of Missouri–St. Louis, National Tropical Botanical Garden, University of Puerto Rico in San Juan
- Theses: Ph.D.: "Revision of Palicourea (Rubiaceae) in Mexico and Central America"; M.S.: "A revision of the genus Monnina (Polygalaceae) in Central America"
- Academic advisors: Robert Lynch Wilbur
- Author abbrev. (botany): C.M. Taylor

Dr. Charlotte M. Taylor is a botanist and professor specialising in taxonomy and conservation. She works with the large plant family Rubiaceae, particularly found in the American tropics and in the tribes Palicoureeae and Psychotrieae. This plant family is an economically important group, as it includes plant species used to make coffee and quinine. Taylor also conducts work related to the floristics of Rubiaceae and morphological radiations of the group. Taylor has collected plant samples from many countries across the globe, including Chile, Colombia, Costa Rica, Panama, and the United States of America, and has named many new species known to science from these regions. As of 2023, Taylor has authored 500 land plant species' names, the third-highest number of such names authored by any female scientist. She has 172 publications on Research Gate alone.

== Education ==
Taylor holds a B.S. from the University of Michigan (1978), and an M.S. (1982) and Ph.D. (1987) from Duke University.

== Career ==
In addition to the work mentioned below, Taylor has identified many herbarium specimens at the Missouri Botanical Garden and at other institutions throughout the world.

=== Floras ===
Taylor has spent much of her career authoring floras (full treatments and catalogues), and she has contributed to several large regional floras, including:

- Flora Mesoamericana (12 genera and ca. 850 species)
- Flora of the Venezuelan Guayana (86 genera and 524 species)
- Flora of China (97 genera and ca. 700 species)
- Catalogue Rubiaceae treatments (see citations below)
- Ecuador (ca. 110 genera and 530 species)
- Peru (ca. 110 genera and 600 species)
- Bolivia (ca. 100 genera, 430 species)

=== Overview of taxonomic work ===
Taylor is an active and prolific scholar. By 2015, she had named 278 species. Within the Rubiaceae group, her main focuses are the species in the neotropical genera Palicourea, Notopleura, Carapichea, Faramea, and Coussarea, the species of the pantropical genus Psychotria, and the species of the Madagascar genus Gaertnera. In addition to the numerous plants that she has named, Taylor has also conducted taxonomic work and transferred species names between different genera. For this reason, she is linked as an author to 1,091 plant species name citation records through the International Plant Names Index (IPNI). A full list of all 1,091 records can be viewed here.

=== Rubiaceae projects ===
In addition to her taxonomic work with this family, Taylor maintains two websites related Rubiaceae to the Missouri Botanical Garden website. The Selected Rubiaceae Tribes and Genera website includes taxonomic parts of previously published works related to the family. The content of the website is also incorporated in Tropicos, the online database of taxonomic information about plants maintained and populated by the Missouri Botanical Garden and its scientific staff.

== Personal life ==
Taylor attributes her interest in plants to her parents, who were "serious bird watchers." However, she opted to study plants instead of birds because it afforded her more freedom to keep to her own research schedule.

Taylor is married to Roy E. Gereau, an Assistant Curator at the Missouri Botanical Garden. Gereau's research interests include plant nomenclature, floristics and phytogeography of eastern Africa, plant conservation assessment in eastern Africa and in Africa generally, classification and identification of East African flowering plant genera, and taxonomy and systematics of African Sapindaceae. Taylor and Gereau have published together on botanical topics.

== New species described ==
As of 2015, Taylor had named 278 plant taxa new to science and authored a total of 771 names. This number has increased to 500 by 2023. She has also assigned new names to existing taxa and created new name combinations. The first species that Taylor described was Palicourea spathacea. A combination is a previously published name that is transferred to another name, for example a species transferred to a different genus, or a variety raised to a species, or a subgenus changed to a section, but it keeps the same name. A full list of Taylor's authored names can be viewed through the Tropicos database.

Collapsed list of new species described by Taylor
- Alibertia premontana C.M. Taylor
- Alseis costaricensis C.M. Taylor
- Amphidasya amethystina J.L. Clark & C.M. Taylor
- Amphidasya brevidentata C.M. Taylor
- Amphidasya elegans C.M. Taylor
- Amphidasya panamensis C.M. Taylor
- Appunia megalantha C.M. Taylor & Lorence
- Bouvardia costaricensis C.M. Taylor
- Carapichea verrucosa C.M. Taylor
- Chiococca caputensis Lorence & C.M. Taylor
- Chomelia chiquitensis C.M. Taylor
- Chomelia costaricensis C.M. Taylor
- Chomelia rubra Lorence & C.M. Taylor
- Chomelia torrana C.M. Taylor
- Chomelia venulosa W.C. Burger & C.M. Taylor
- Coussarea acrensis C.M. Taylor
- Coussarea amplifolia C.M. Taylor
- Coussarea antioquiana C.M. Taylor
- Coussarea boliviensis C.M. Taylor
- Coussarea brevipedunculata C.M. Taylor
- Coussarea camposiana C.M. Taylor
- Coussarea cephaeloides C.M. Taylor
- Coussarea cephaëloides C.M. Taylor
- Coussarea dulcifolia D.A. Neill, Cerón & C.M. Taylor
- Coussarea duplex C.M. Taylor
- Coussarea ecuadorensis C.M. Taylor
- Coussarea grandifructa C.M. Taylor
- Coussarea izabalensis C.M. Taylor
- Coussarea linearis C.M. Taylor
- Coussarea loftonii subsp. calimana C.M. Taylor
- Coussarea loftonii subsp. occidentalis C.M. Taylor
- Coussarea maranonensis C.M. Taylor
- Coussarea mexiae C.M. Taylor
- Coussarea nigrescens C.M. Taylor & Hammel
- Coussarea pilosula C.M. Taylor
- Coussarea pilosula C.M. Taylor
- Coussarea pseudopilosula C.M. Taylor
- Coussarea psychotrioides C.M. Taylor & Hammel
- Coussarea resinosa C.M. Taylor
- Coussarea sancti-ciprianii C.M. Taylor
- Coussarea spiciformis C.M. Taylor
- Coussarea spiciformis C.M. Taylor
- Coussarea vasqueziana C.M. Taylor
- Coutarea coutaportloides C.M. Taylor
- Coutarea fuchsioides C.M. Taylor
- Danais antilahimenae C.M. Taylor
- Danais disticha C.M. Taylor
- Danais laciniata C.M. Taylor
- Danais masoalana C.M. Taylor
- Danais rakotovaoi C.M. Taylor
- Danais randrianaivoi C.M. Taylor
- Duroia laevis Devia, C.H. Perss. & C.M. Taylor
- Duroia sancti-ciprianii Devia, C.H. Perss. & C.M. Taylor
- Elaeagia chiriquina C.M. Taylor
- Elaeagia glossostipula C.M. Taylor
- Faramea accumulans C.M. Taylor
- Faramea ampla C.M. Taylor
- Faramea angusta C.M. Taylor
- Faramea areolata C.M. Taylor
- Faramea calimana C.M. Taylor
- Faramea calyptrata C.M. Taylor
- Faramea coffeoides C.M. Taylor
- Faramea colombiana C.M. Taylor
- Faramea condorica C.M. Taylor
- Faramea correae C.M. Taylor
- Faramea cupheoides C.M. Taylor
- Faramea frondosa C.M. Taylor
- Faramea guaramacalensis C.M. Taylor
- Faramea longistipula C.M. Taylor
- Faramea melicoccoides C.M. Taylor
- Faramea monsalveae C.M. Taylor
- Faramea ortiziana C.M. Taylor
- Faramea permagnifolia Dwyer ex C.M. Taylor
- Faramea robusta C.M. Taylor
- Faramea sanblasensis C.M. Taylor
- Faramea schunkeana C.M. Taylor
- Faramea uncinata C.M. Taylor
- Faramea vasquezii C.M. Taylor
- Faramea verticillata C.M. Taylor
- Gaertnera arenarioides C.M. Taylor
- Gaertnera breviflora C.M. Taylor
- Gaertnera hirsuta C.M. Taylor
- Gaertnera laevis C.M. Taylor
- Gaertnera littoralis C.M. Taylor
- Gaertnera malcomberiana C.M. Taylor
- Gaertnera masoalana C.M. Taylor
- Gaertnera nitida C.M. Taylor
- Gaertnera rakotovaoana C.M. Taylor
- Gaertnera razakamalalana C.M. Taylor
- Gaertnera robusta C.M. Taylor
- Gaertnera rubra C.M. Taylor
- Gaertnera sclerophylla C.M. Taylor
- Gaertnera velutina C.M. Taylor
- Gaertnera vernicosa C.M. Taylor
- Gaertnera xerophila C.M. Taylor
- Gonzalagunia mildrediae D.R. Simpson ex C.M. Taylor
- Gonzalagunia osaensis C.M. Taylor
- Gonzalagunia villosa D.R. Simpson ex C.M. Taylor
- Guettarda subcapitata C.M. Taylor
- Hillia grayumii C.M. Taylor
- Hillia oaxacana C.M. Taylor
- Hillia pumila C.M. Taylor
- Hillia rivalis C.M. Taylor
- Hillia subg. Andinae C.M. Taylor
- Hillia subg. Illustres C.M. Taylor
- Hillia subg. Tetrandrae C.M. Taylor
- Hippotis stellata C.M. Taylor & Rova
- Hoffmannia barbillana C.M. Taylor
- Hoffmannia boliviana C.M. Taylor
- Hoffmannia boraginoides Dwyer ex W.C. Burger & C.M. Taylor
- Hoffmannia coriacea C.M. Taylor
- Hoffmannia costaricensis C.M. Taylor
- Hoffmannia formicaria C.M. Taylor
- Hoffmannia hammelii C.M. Taylor
- Hoffmannia limonensis C.M. Taylor
- Hoffmannia micrantha C.M. Taylor
- Hoffmannia pacifica C.M. Taylor
- Hoffmannia pseudovesiculifera C.M. Taylor
- Hoffmannia rivalis C.M. Taylor
- Hoffmannia subcapitata C.M. Taylor
- Hoffmannia tilaranensis C.M. Taylor
- Hoffmannia turrialbana C.M. Taylor
- Hoffmannia veraguensis C.M. Taylor
- Ixora knappiae C.M. Taylor
- Joosia antioquiana C.M. Taylor
- Joosia capitata C.M. Taylor
- Joosia confusa C.M. Taylor
- Joosia frondosa C.M. Taylor
- Ladenbergia franciscana C.M. Taylor
- Malanea campylocarpa C.M. Taylor
- Malanea cylindrica C.M. Taylor
- Malanea ecuadorensis C.M. Taylor
- Manettia longipedicellata C.M. Taylor
- Margaritopsis inconspicua C.M. Taylor
- Monnina ferreyrae C.M. Taylor
- Monnina parasylvatica C.M. Taylor
- Neoblakea ecuadorensis C.M. Taylor
- Notopleura acuta C.M. Taylor
- Notopleura aequatoriana C.M. Taylor
- Notopleura albens C.M. Taylor
- Notopleura amicitiae C.M. Taylor
- Notopleura bahiensis C.M. Taylor
- Notopleura biloba C.M. Taylor
- Notopleura bryophila C.M. Taylor
- Notopleura callejasii C.M. Taylor
- Notopleura capitata C.M. Taylor
- Notopleura cincinalis C.M. Taylor
- Notopleura cocleensis C.M. Taylor
- Notopleura congesta C.M. Taylor
- Notopleura corniculata C.M. Taylor
- Notopleura corymbosa C.M. Taylor
- Notopleura costaricensis C.M. Taylor
- Notopleura cundinamarcana C.M. Taylor
- Notopleura elegans C.M. Taylor
- Notopleura episcandens C.M. Taylor & Lorence
- Notopleura hondurensis C.M. Taylor
- Notopleura hurtadoi C.M. Taylor
- Notopleura hypolaevis C.M. Taylor
- Notopleura iridescens C.M. Taylor
- Notopleura lanosa C.M. Taylor
- Notopleura longiflora C.M. Taylor
- Notopleura longipedunculata C.M. Taylor
- Notopleura montana C.M. Taylor
- Notopleura multinervia C.M. Taylor
- Notopleura nepokroeffiae C.M. Taylor
- Notopleura obtusa C.M. Taylor
- Notopleura pacorana C.M. Taylor
- Notopleura parasiggersiana C.M. Taylor
- Notopleura parvifolia C.M. Taylor
- Notopleura penduliflora C.M. Taylor
- Notopleura pilosula C.M. Taylor
- Notopleura pyramidata C.M. Taylor
- Notopleura recondita Hammel & C.M. Taylor
- Notopleura sanblasensis C.M. Taylor
- Notopleura scarlatina C.M. Taylor
- Notopleura spiciformis C.M. Taylor
- Notopleura steyermarkiana C.M. Taylor
- Notopleura submarginalis C.M. Taylor
- Notopleura torrana C.M. Taylor
- Notopleura triaxillaris C.M. Taylor
- Notopleura tubulistipula C.M. Taylor
- Notopleura vargasiana C.M. Taylor
- Notopleura zarucchiana C.M. Taylor
- Paederia taolagnarensis Razafim. & C.M. Taylor
- Palicourea albaniana C.M. Taylor
- Palicourea albocaerulea C.M. Taylor
- Palicourea anderssoniana C.M. Taylor
- Palicourea andina C.M. Taylor
- Palicourea andina subsp. panamensis C.M. Taylor
- Palicourea anianguana C.M. Taylor
- Palicourea asplundii C.M. Taylor
- Palicourea australis C.M. Taylor
- Palicourea awa C.M. Taylor
- Palicourea azulina C.M. Taylor
- Palicourea azurea C.M. Taylor
- Palicourea bellula C.M. Taylor
- Palicourea betancuriana C.M. Taylor
- Palicourea bullulata C.M. Taylor
- Palicourea cajamarcana C.M. Taylor
- Palicourea calophlebioides C.M. Taylor
- Palicourea canarina C.M. Taylor
- Palicourea candida C.M. Taylor
- Palicourea chignul C.M. Taylor
- Palicourea clerodendroides C.M. Taylor
- Palicourea cogolloi C.M. Taylor
- Palicourea condorica C.M. Taylor
- Palicourea corniculata C.M. Taylor
- Palicourea cornigera C.M. Taylor
- Palicourea crystallina C.M. Taylor
- Palicourea cuspidata subsp. occidentalis C.M. Taylor
- Palicourea cutucuana C.M. Taylor
- Palicourea deviae C.M. Taylor
- Palicourea diminuta C.M. Taylor
- Palicourea dodsoniana C.M. Taylor
- Palicourea eburnea C.M. Taylor
- Palicourea foreroi C.M. Taylor
- Palicourea frontinoensis Cogollo & C.M. Taylor
- Palicourea garcioides C.M. Taylor
- Palicourea gelsemiiflora C.M. Taylor
- Palicourea gemmiflora C.M. Taylor
- Palicourea gentryi C.M. Taylor
- Palicourea glandulifera C.M. Taylor
- Palicourea gomezii C.M. Taylor
- Palicourea grandiceps C.M. Taylor
- Palicourea hammelii C.M. Taylor
- Palicourea harlingii C.M. Taylor
- Palicourea hollinensis C.M. Taylor
- Palicourea hondurensis C.M. Taylor
- Palicourea ianthina C.M. Taylor
- Palicourea jaramilloi C.M. Taylor
- Palicourea jatun-sachensis C.M. Taylor
- Palicourea kahirica C.M. Taylor
- Palicourea lemoniana C.M. Taylor
- Palicourea lewisiorum C.M. Taylor
- Palicourea locellata C.M. Taylor
- Palicourea loxensis C.M. Taylor
- Palicourea lozanoana C.M. Taylor
- Palicourea lugoana C.M. Taylor
- Palicourea luteonivea C.M. Taylor
- Palicourea macarthurorum C.M. Taylor
- Palicourea madidiensis C.M. Taylor
- Palicourea matamana C.M. Taylor
- Palicourea meieri C.M. Taylor
- Palicourea mistratoana C.M. Taylor
- Palicourea murciae C.M. Taylor
- Palicourea neillii C.M. Taylor
- Palicourea orosiana C.M. Taylor
- Palicourea orquidea C.M. Taylor
- Palicourea otongaensis C.M. Taylor
- Palicourea oxapampana C.M. Taylor
- Palicourea pachystipula C.M. Taylor
- Palicourea palaciosii C.M. Taylor
- Palicourea palustris A.C. Gilman & C.M. Taylor
- Palicourea parrana C.M. Taylor
- Palicourea paujilensis C.M. Taylor
- Palicourea pendula C.M. Taylor
- Palicourea pereziana C.M. Taylor
- Palicourea plowmanii D.R. Simpson ex C.M. Taylor
- Palicourea premontana C.M. Taylor
- Palicourea prodiga Standl. ex C.M. Taylor
- Palicourea providenciana J. Sánchez-Gonz. & C.M. Taylor
- Palicourea purpurea C.M. Taylor
- Palicourea quadrifolia subsp. leticiana C.M. Taylor
- Palicourea quadrilateralis C.M. Taylor
- Palicourea quinquepyrena C.M. Taylor
- Palicourea rodriguezii C.M. Taylor
- Palicourea roseofaucis C.M. Taylor
- Palicourea sancti-ciprianii C.M. Taylor
- Palicourea sanluisensis C.M. Taylor
- Palicourea sect. Cephaeloides C.M. Taylor
- Palicourea sect. Chocoanae C.M. Taylor
- Palicourea sect. Crocothyrsae C.M. Taylor
- Palicourea sect. Didymocarpae C.M. Taylor
- Palicourea sect. Grandiflorae C.M. Taylor
- Palicourea sect. Montanae C.M. Taylor
- Palicourea sect. Obovoideae C.M. Taylor
- Palicourea sect. Pseudoamethystinae C.M. Taylor
- Palicourea sect. Psychotrioides C.M. Taylor
- Palicourea shuar C.M. Taylor
- Palicourea simpsonii C.M. Taylor
- Palicourea skotakii C.M. Taylor
- Palicourea smithiana C.M. Taylor
- Palicourea sopkinii C.M. Taylor
- Palicourea spathacea C.M. Taylor
- Palicourea stellata C.M. Taylor
- Palicourea subalatoides C.M. Taylor
- Palicourea subg. Montanae C.M. Taylor
- Palicourea subtomentosa subsp. lojana C.M. Taylor
- Palicourea sucllii C.M. Taylor
- Palicourea tilaranensis C.M. Taylor
- Palicourea topoensis C.M. Taylor
- Palicourea tunquiensis C.M. Taylor
- Palicourea ucayalina C.M. Taylor
- Palicourea ulloana C.M. Taylor
- Palicourea valenzuelana C.M. Taylor
- Palicourea vernicosa C.M. Taylor
- Palicourea vulcanalis Standl. ex C.M. Taylor
- Palicourea yanesha C.M. Taylor
- Palicourea zarucchii C.M. Taylor
- Patima minor C.M. Taylor
- Pentagonia angustifolia C.M. Taylor
- Pentagonia australis C.M. Taylor & Janovec
- Pentagonia dwyeriana C.M. Taylor
- Pentagonia involucrata C.M. Taylor
- Pentagonia lobata C.M. Taylor
- Pentagonia monocaulis C.M. Taylor
- Pentagonia osaensis C.M. Taylor
- Pentagonia sanblasensis C.M. Taylor
- Pittoniotis rotata C.M. Taylor
- Posoqueria chocoana C.M. Taylor
- Posoqueria correana C.M. Taylor
- Posoqueria costaricensis C.M. Taylor
- Posoqueria grandifructa Hammel & C.M. Taylor
- Posoqueria laevis C.M. Taylor
- Posoqueria longifilamentosa C.M. Taylor
- Posoqueria robusta Hammel & C.M. Taylor
- Posoqueria tarairensis C.M. Taylor & Cortés-Ballén
- Psychotria acicularis C.M. Taylor
- Psychotria anisophylla C.M. Taylor
- Psychotria areolata C.M. Taylor
- Psychotria awa C.M. Taylor
- Psychotria burgeri C.M. Taylor
- Psychotria calidicola C.M. Taylor
- Psychotria calyptrata C.M. Taylor
- Psychotria cauligera C.M. Taylor
- Psychotria cenepensis C.M. Taylor
- Psychotria ceronii C.M. Taylor
- Psychotria cerrocoloradensis Dwyer ex C.M. Taylor
- Psychotria chamelaensis C.M. Taylor & Domínguez Licona, Eduardo
- Psychotria chocoana C.M. Taylor
- Psychotria cochabambana C.M. Taylor
- Psychotria convergens C.M. Taylor
- Psychotria cornejoi C.M. Taylor
- Psychotria cutucuana C.M. Taylor
- Psychotria davidsmithiana C.M. Taylor
- Psychotria deneversii C.M. Taylor
- Psychotria diminuta C.M. Taylor
- Psychotria esmeraldana C.M. Taylor
- Psychotria fusiformis C.M. Taylor
- Psychotria gaitalensis C.M. Taylor
- Psychotria grahamii C.M. Taylor
- Psychotria hamiltoniana C.M. Taylor
- Psychotria hemisphaerica Dwyer ex C.M. Taylor
- Psychotria herrerana C.M. Taylor
- Psychotria huampamiensis C.M. Taylor
- Psychotria hypochlorina C.M. Taylor
- Psychotria jefensis Dwyer ex C.M. Taylor
- Psychotria juarezana C.M. Taylor & Lorence
- Psychotria leitana C.M. Taylor
- Psychotria lorenciana C.M. Taylor
- Psychotria matagalpensis C.M. Taylor
- Psychotria maynasana C.M. Taylor
- Psychotria monsalveae C.M. Taylor
- Psychotria montivaga C.M. Taylor
- Psychotria orosioides C.M. Taylor
- Psychotria ortiziana C.M. Taylor
- Psychotria osaensis C.M. Taylor
- Psychotria ovatistipula C.M. Taylor
- Psychotria ownbeyi Standl. ex C.M. Taylor
- Psychotria paeonia C.M. Taylor
- Psychotria pandoana C.M. Taylor
- Psychotria paradichroa C.M. Taylor
- Psychotria paravillosa C.M. Taylor
- Psychotria purpureocapitata Dwyer ex C.M. Taylor
- Psychotria puyoana C.M. Taylor
- Psychotria rhombibractea C.M. Taylor & M.T. Campos
- Psychotria rhombibracteata C.M. Taylor & M.T. Campos
- Psychotria romolerouxiana C.M. Taylor
- Psychotria sacciformis C.M. Taylor
- Psychotria saltatrix C.M. Taylor
- Psychotria sanblasensis C.M. Taylor
- Psychotria sanchezii C.M. Taylor
- Psychotria simiarum subsp. chiapensis C.M. Taylor
- Psychotria sinuata C.M. Taylor
- Psychotria soejartoi C.M. Taylor
- Psychotria sopkinii C.M. Taylor
- Psychotria tapantiensis C.M. Taylor
- Psychotria ucumariana C.M. Taylor
- Psychotria vesiculifera C.M. Taylor
- Raritebe axillare C.M. Taylor
- Remijia uniflora C.M. Taylor
- Rosenbergiodendron reflexum C.M. Taylor & Lorence
- Rudgea grandifructa C.M. Taylor & M. Monsalve
- Rudgea hemisphaerica Dwyer ex C.M. Taylor
- Rudgea laevis C.M. Taylor
- Rudgea mandevillifolia Dwyer ex C.M. Taylor
- Rudgea mcphersonii Dwyer ex C.M. Taylor
- Rudgea sanblasensis C.M. Taylor
- Rustia kosnipatana S. Will & C.M. Taylor
- Sabicea chocoana C.M. Taylor
- Schizocalyx condoricus D.A. Neill & C.M. Taylor
- Schizocalyx truncatus C.M. Taylor
- Schradera obtusifolia C.M. Taylor
- Schradera reticulata C.M. Taylor ex J. Sánchez-Gonz.
- Simira cesariana C.M. Taylor
- Simira hirsuta C.M. Taylor
- Warszewiczia uxpanapensis subsp. meridionalis C.M. Taylor

== Works ==
Selected publications on Palicourea taxonomy

- Taylor, C.M. 1997. Conspectus of the genus Palicourea (Rubiaceae: Psychotrieae) with the description of same new species from Ecuador. Ann. Missouri Bot. Gard. 84: 224-262.
- Taylor, C.M, D.H. Lorence, & R.E. Gereau. 2010. Rubiacearum americanarum magna hama pars XXV: The nocturnally flowering Psychotria domingensis-Coussarea hondensis group plus three other Mesoamerican Psychotria species transfer to Palicourea. Novon 20: 481-492.

Selected Publications on Genera of Palicoureeae and Psychotrieae

- Taylor, C.M. 2001. Overview of the neotropical genus Notopleura (Rubiaceae: Psychotrieae), with the description of some new species. Ann. Missouri Bot. Gard. 88: 478-515.
- Taylor, C.M. 2003. Rubiacearum americanarum magna hama. Pars XIV. New species and a new combination in Notopleura (Psychotrieae) from Central and South America. Novon 13: 228-260.
- Taylor, C.M. 2005. Margaritopsis (Rubiaceae, Psychotrieae) in the Neotropics. Syst. Geogr. Pl. 75: 161-177.
- Taylor, C.M. 2011. The genus Coccochondra (neotropical Rubiaceae) expanded. Pl. Ecol. & Evol. 144(1): 115-118.
- Taylor, C.M. & R.E. Gereau. 2013. The genus Carapichea (Rubiaceae). Ann. Missouri Bot. Gard. 99: 100-127.
- Razafimandimbison, S.G., C.M. Taylor, N. Widstrom, T. Paillier, A. Khobadandeh, B. Bremer. 2014. Phylogeny and generic limits in the sister tribes Psychotrieae and Palicoureeae (Rubiaceae): Evolution of schizocarps in Psychotria and origins of bacterial leaf nodules of the Malagasy species. Amer. J. Bot. 101: 1102-1126.
- Taylor, C.M. 2015. Rubiacearum americanarum magna hama XXXIII: Overview of the new group Palicourea sect. Didymocarpae with four new species and two new subspecies (Palicoureeae). Novon 23: 452-478.
- Taylor, C.M. 2015. Rubiacearum americanarum magna hama XXXIV: Overview of the new group Palicourea sect. Tricephalium with either new species and a new subspecies (Palicoureeae). Novon 24: 55-95.

Selected flora treatments

- Taylor, C.M. 1999. Faramea, Coussarea, Palicourea. In: G. Harling and L. Andersson, eds. Flora of Ecuador 62(3): 134-235, 245-314.
- Taylor, C.M., J.A. Steyermark, P. Delprete, C. Persson, C. Costa, A. Vincentini, & R. Cortés. 2004. Rubiaceae. In: J.A. Steyermark, P.E. Berry, K. Yatskievych, & B.K. Holst, eds. Flora of the Venezuelan Guayana 8:497-847.
- Campos, M.T.V.A., C.M. & Taylor & D. Zappi. 2007. Rubiaceae. In: M. Hopkins et al., Flora of the Ducke Reserve. Rodriguesia 58: 549-616.
- Chen, T., H. Zhu; J.-R. Chen; C.M.Taylor, F. Ehrendorfer, H. Lantz, A.M. Funsten, C. Puff. 2011. Rubiaceae. In: Z.-G. Wu, P.H. Raven, & D.-Y. Hong, dirs. Flora of China 19: 57-368.
- D.H. Lorence, C.M. Taylor, & Collaborators. 2012. Rubiaceae. In: Flora Mesoamericana 4(2): 1-288.
- Taylor, C.M., B.E. Hammel, & D.H. Lorence. 2014. Rubiaceae. In: B.E. Hammel, M.H. Grayum, M.C. Herrera Mora, & N. Zamora, eds. Manual de Plantas de Costa Rica. Volumen VII. Dicotiledóneas (Picramniaceae-Rutaceae). Monogr. Syst. Bot. Missouri Bot. Gard. 129: 464-779.

Selected floristic catalogues

- Taylor, C.M. & A. Pool. 1993. Rubiaceae. In: L. Brako et al., Catalogue of the Flowering Plants and Gymnosperms of Peru. Monogr. Syst. Bot. Missouri Bot. Gard. 45: 1010 1053.
- Taylor, C.M. 1999. Rubiaceae. In P. Jørgensen & S. León, Catalogue of the vascular plants of Ecuador. Monogr. Syst. Bot. Missouri Bot. Gard.75: 855-878.
- Bacigalupo, N.M., E.L. Cabral, & C.M. Taylor. 2008. Rubiaceae. In: F.O. Zuloaga, O. Morrone, & M.J. Belgrano, eds. Católogo de las Plantas Vasculares del Cono Sur. Monogr. Syst. Bot. Missouri Bot. Gard. 107(3): 1871-2920.
- Taylor, C.M. 2011. Rubiaceae. In: A. Idárraga P., R. del C. Ortiz, R. Callejas P., & M. Merello. Flora de Antioquia, Catálogo de las Plantas Vasculares, Vol. 2, Listado de las Plantas Vasculares del Departamento de Antioquia, pp. 822–854. Universidad de Antioquia.
- Taylor, C.M., E. Cabral, & N. Bacigalupo. 2014. Rubiaceae. In: P. Jørgensen, M. Nee, & S. Beck, eds. Catálogo de las Plantas Vasculares de Bolivia. Monogr. Syst. Bot. Missouri Bot. Gard. 127(2): 1140-1171.
