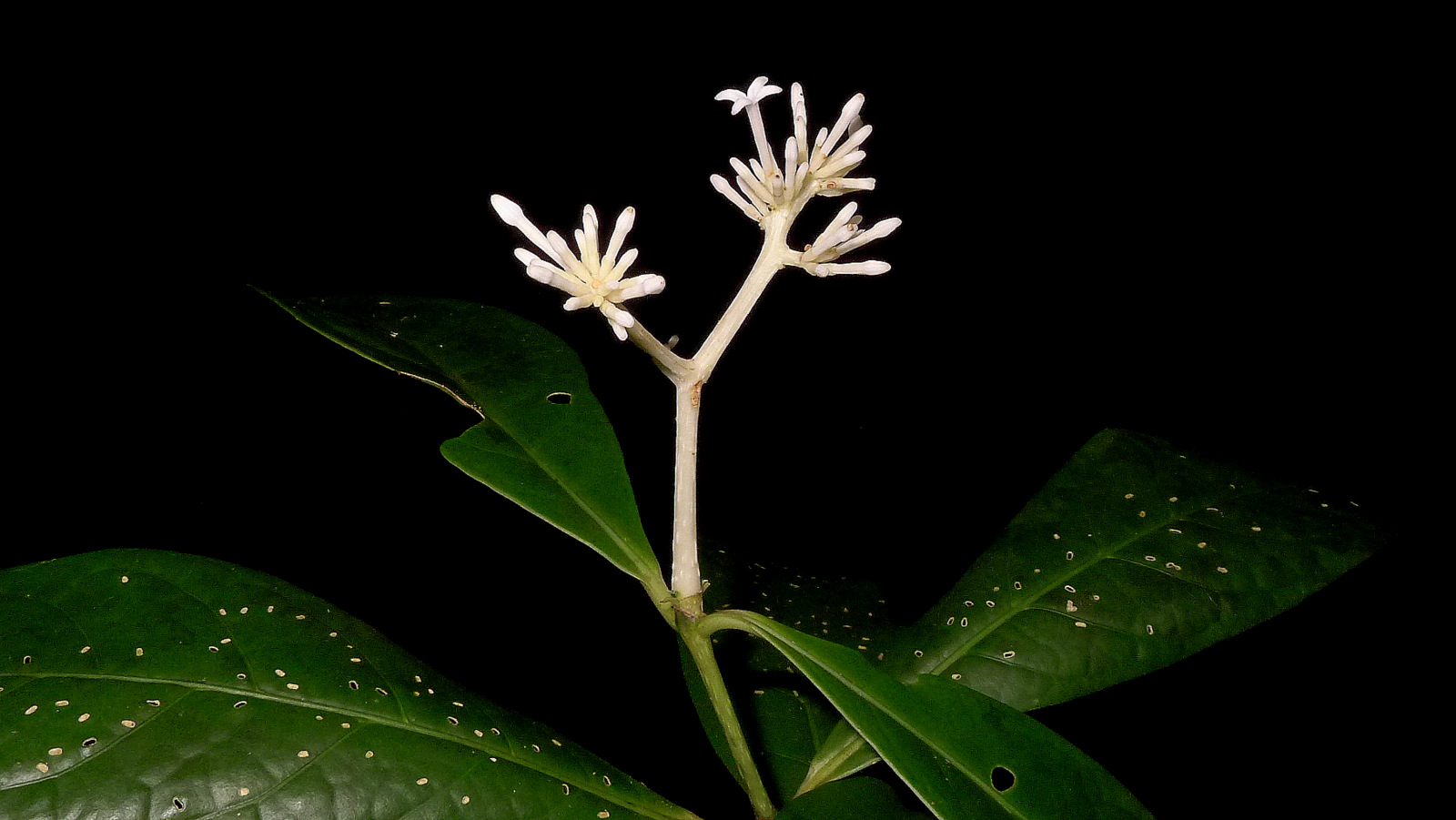
- Coussarea albescens

Scientific classification
- Kingdom: Plantae
- Clade: Tracheophytes
- Clade: Angiosperms
- Clade: Eudicots
- Clade: Asterids
- Order: Gentianales
- Family: Rubiaceae
- Subfamily: Rubioideae
- Tribe: Coussareeae; Hook.f.

Synonyms
- Coccocypseleae Bremek.

= Coussareeae =

Tribe of plants

Coussareeae are a Neotropical clade of morphologically heterogeneous plants in the subfamily Rubioideae of the coffee family (Rubiaceae). The tribe encompasses about 330 species assigned to ten genera: Bradea, Coccocypselum, Coussarea, Cruckshanksia, Declieuxia, Faramea, Heterophyllaea, Hindsia, Oreopolus, and Standleya. Historically, the genera of Coussareeae have rarely been considered closely related, and the widely defined Coussareeae were delimited based on molecular systematics without proposed morphological synapomorphies.

== Genera ==
Currently accepted names

- Bradea Standl. (6 sp)
- Coccocypselum P.Browne (22 sp)
- Coussarea Aubl. (120 sp)
- Cruckshanksia Hook. & Arn. (7 sp)
- Declieuxia Kunth (29 sp)
- Faramea Aubl. (204 sp)
- Heterophyllaea Hook.f. (2 sp)
- Hindsia Benth. ex Lindl. (11 sp)
- Oreopolus Schltdl. (1 sp)
- Standleya Brade (6 sp)

Synonyms

- Antoniana Tussac = Faramea
- Bellardia Schreb. = Coccocypselum
- Billardiera Vahl = Coussarea
- Cococipsilum J.St.-Hil. = Coccocypselum
- Condalia Ruiz & Pav. = Coccocypselum
- Congdonia Jeps. = Declieuxia
- Darluca Raf. = Faramea
- Encopea C.Presl = Faramea
- Evea Aubl. = Faramea
- Froelichia Vahl = Coussarea
- Homaloclados Hook.f. = Faramea
- Lecanosperma Rusby = Heterophyllaea
- Lipostoma D.Don = Coccocypselum
- Macrosiphon Miq. = Hindsia
- Neleixa Raf. = Faramea
- Pecheya Scop. = Coussarea
- Peckeya Raf. = Coussarea
- Potima R.Hedw. = Faramea
- Rotheria Meyen = Cruckshanksia
- Sicelium P.Browne = Coccocypselum
- Sulzeria Roem. & Schult. = Faramea
- Tetramerium C.F.Gaertn. = Faramea
- Thiersia Baill. = Faramea
- Tontanea Aubl. = Coccocypselum
