= Goodenia forrestii =

Scientific classification
- Kingdom: Plantae
- Clade: Tracheophytes
- Clade: Angiosperms
- Clade: Eudicots
- Clade: Asterids
- Order: Asterales
- Family: Goodeniaceae
- Genus: Goodenia
- Species: G. forrestii

Binomial name
- Goodenia forrestii F.Muell.

Synonyms
- Goodenia lasiophylla K.Krause

Species of plant

Goodenia forrestii is a species of flowering plant in the family Goodeniaceae and is endemic to Western Australia. It is an ascending to low-lying herb with elliptic to lance-shaped leaves with teeth on the edges, and racemes of yellow flowers with a brownish centre.

== Description ==
Goodenia forrestii is a hairy, ascending to low-lying herb with stems up to 50 cm (20 in) long. The leaves are elliptic to lance-shaped with the narrower end towards the base, 20–60 mm (0.79–2.36 in) long and 5–20 mm (0.20–0.79 in) wide with teeth on the edges. The flowers are arranged in racemes up to 250 mm (9.8 in) long, the individual flowers on pedicels 15–30 mm (0.59–1.18 in) long with leaf-like bracts at the base. The sepals are lance-shaped, 2.5–3 mm (0.098–0.118 in) long, the corolla yellow with a brownish centre, 12–15 mm (0.47–0.59 in) long. The lower lobes of the corolla are 2.5–3 mm (0.098–0.118 in) long with wings 2–2.5 mm (0.079–0.098 in) wide. Flowering mainly occurs from May to September and the fruit is a more or less spherical capsule about 6 mm (0.24 in) in diameter.

== Taxonomy and naming ==
Goodenia forrestii was first formally described in 1892 by Ferdinand von Mueller in The Victorian Naturalist from specimens collected by Sir John Forrest. The specific epithet (forrestii) honours Forrest.

== Distribution and habitat ==
This goodenia grows in sandy soil in scrub and woodland in the Carnarvon, Gascoyne and Pilbara biogeographic regions in the north-west of Western Australia.

== Conservation status ==
Goodenia forrestii is classified as "not threatened" by the Government of Western Australia Department of Parks and Wildlife.
