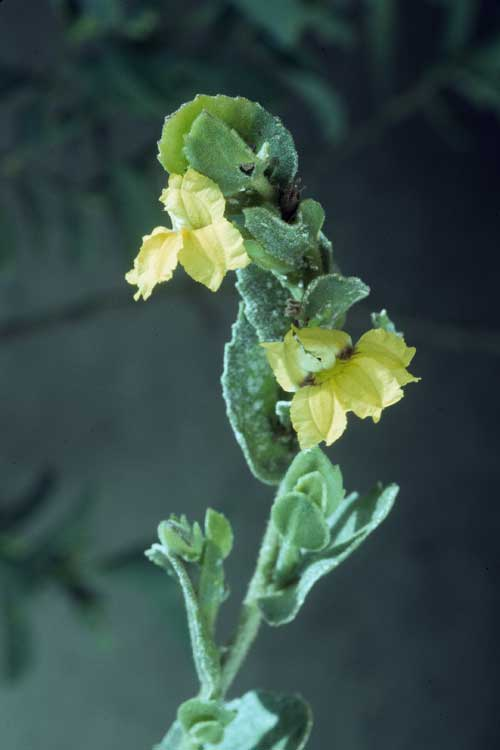
- Goodenia amplexans in the ANBG

Scientific classification
- Kingdom: Plantae
- Clade: Tracheophytes
- Clade: Angiosperms
- Clade: Eudicots
- Clade: Asterids
- Order: Asterales
- Family: Goodeniaceae
- Genus: Goodenia
- Species: G. amplexans

Binomial name
- Goodenia amplexans F.Muell.

Synonyms
- Goodenia amplexans F.Muell. var. amplexans; Goodenia amplexans var. angustifolia K.Krause

= Goodenia amplexans =

Clasping goodenia

Species of plant

Goodenia amplexans, commonly known as clasping goodenia, is a species of flowering plant in the family Goodeniaceae and endemic to South Australia. It is a small shrub with sticky foliage, egg-shaped to oblong or elliptic, stem-clasping leaves with small teeth on the edges, racemes of yellow flowers with leaf-like bracteoles at the base, and elliptic fruit.

== Description ==
Goodenia amplexans is an aromatic, erect undershrub or shrubby herb that typically grows to a height of 100 cm (39 in) and has hairy, sticky foliage. The leaves are arranged in opposite pairs, sessile, stem-clasping, egg-shaped to oblong or elliptic, 30–90 mm (1.2–3.5 in) long and 5–30 mm (0.20–1.18 in) wide with small teeth on the edges. The flowers are arranged in spike-like racemes up to 150 mm (5.9 in) long on a peduncle 1–2 mm (0.039–0.079 in) long with linear to lance-shaped, leaf-like bracteoles 1–2 mm (0.039–0.079 in) long at the base, each flower on a pedicel 2–3 mm (0.079–0.118 in) long. The sepals are lance-shaped, 2.5–3.5 mm (0.098–0.138 in) long and the corolla is yellow, 12–15 mm (0.47–0.59 in) long and glabrous. The lower lobes of the corolla are 3.5–7.5 mm (0.14–0.30 in) long with wings 1–2.5 mm (0.039–0.098 in) wide. Flowering mainly occurs from August to February and the fruit is an elliptic capsule about 6 mm (0.24 in) long.

== Taxonomy and naming ==
Goodenia amplexans was first formally described in 1857 by Ferdinand von Mueller in the Transactions of the Philosophical Institute of Victoria from plants growing on "ridges and gullies near Adelaide". The specific epithet (amplexans) means "embracing", referring to the stem-clasping leaves.

== Distribution and habitat ==
Clasping goodenia grows in forest and woodland and on sea cliffs in the southern Flinders Ranges, the Mount Lofty Ranges and Kangaroo Island in South Australia.
