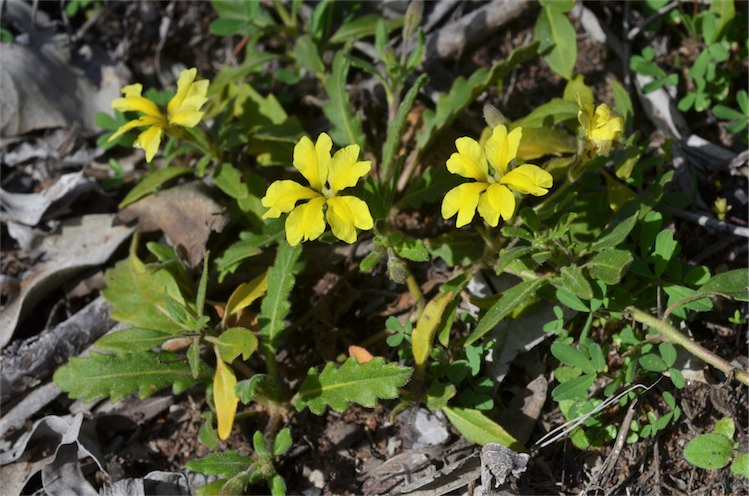
- Near Narrabri

Scientific classification
- Kingdom: Plantae
- Clade: Tracheophytes
- Clade: Angiosperms
- Clade: Eudicots
- Clade: Asterids
- Order: Asterales
- Family: Goodeniaceae
- Genus: Goodenia
- Species: G. cycloptera

Binomial name
- Goodenia cycloptera R.Br.

Synonyms
- List: Goodenia grandiflora var. nicholsonii (F.Muell.) K.Krause; Goodenia mitchellii Benth.; Goodenia mitchellii f. subrotunda Domin nom. inval., nom. nud.; Goodenia mitchellii Benth. var. mitchellii; Goodenia mitchellii var. typica Domin nom. inval.; Goodenia nicholsoni F.Muell. orth. var.; Goodenia nicholsonii F.Muell.

= Goodenia cycloptera =

Species of plant

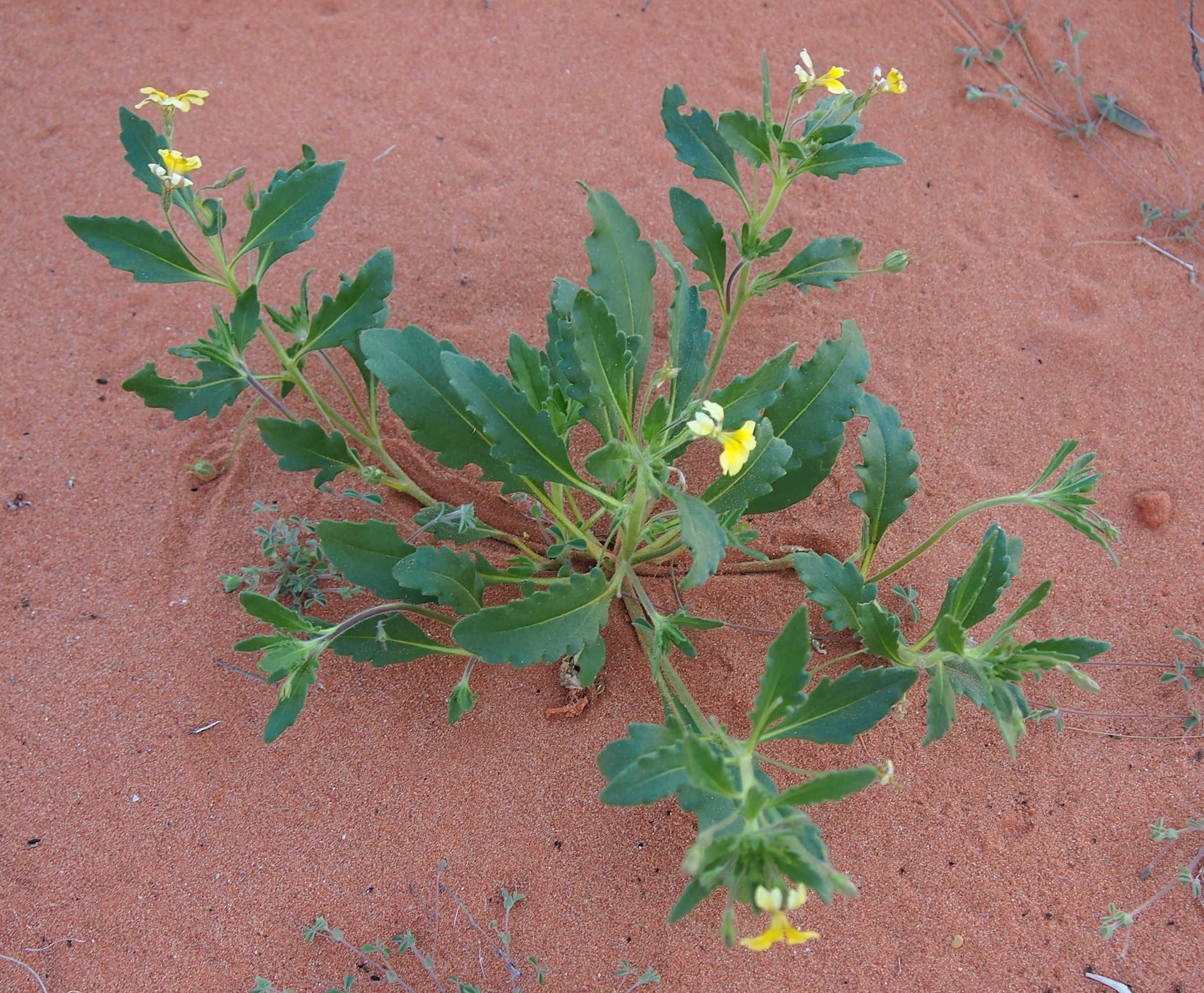
Habit

Goodenia cycloptera is a species of flowering plant in the family Goodeniaceae and is endemic to Australia. It is a widely distributed, perennial or annual herb with wavy or toothed leaves, yellow flowers arranged in leafy racemes and more or less spherical fruit.

== Description ==
Goodenia cycloptera is an ascending or low-lying perennial or annual herb that typically grows to a height of 30 cm (12 in). The leaves at the base of the plant are egg-shaped with the narrower end towards the base to spatula-shaped, 40–100 mm (1.6–3.9 in) long and 10–15 mm (0.39–0.59 in) wide with wavy to toothed edges, but those on the stem are smaller. The flowers are arranged in leafy racemes up to 200 mm (7.9 in) long with leaf-like bracts at the base, each flower on a pedicel 15–50 mm (0.59–1.97 in) long. The sepals are linear to lance-shaped, 2.5–3 mm (0.098–0.118 in) long and the petals are yellow, 10–15 mm (0.39–0.59 in) long. The lower lobes of the corolla are about 4 mm (0.16 in) long with wings about 2–3 mm (0.079–0.118 in) wide. Flowering occurs in most months and the fruit is more or less spherical capsule 6–7 mm (0.24–0.28 in) in diameter.

== Taxonomy and naming ==
Goodenia cycloptera was first formally described in 1849 Robert Brown in the Botanical Index to Charles Sturt's Narrative of an Expedition into Central Australia. The specific epithet (cycloptera) means "circle-winged", referring to the seeds.

== Distribution and habitat ==
Goodenia cycloptera grows in a sandy soils in the drier inland parts of Western Australia, South Australia, the Northern Territory, Queensland and New South Wales.
