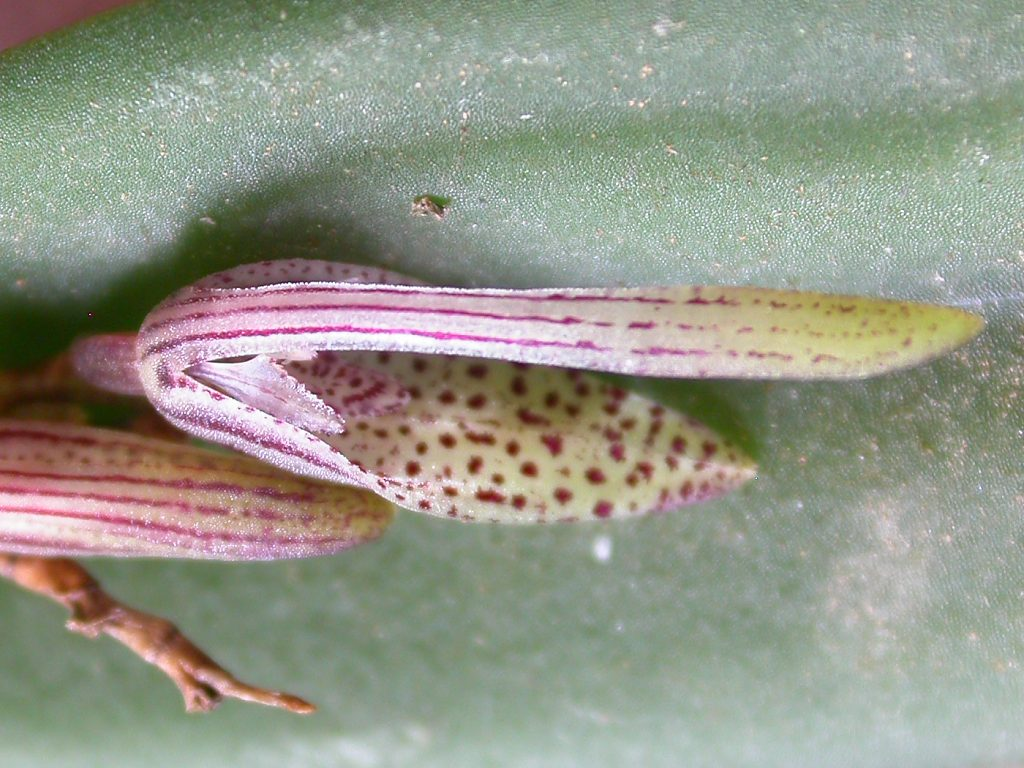

Scientific classification
- Kingdom: Plantae
- Clade: Tracheophytes
- Clade: Angiosperms
- Clade: Monocots
- Order: Asparagales
- Family: Orchidaceae
- Subfamily: Epidendroideae
- Genus: Acianthera
- Species: A. gracilisepala

Binomial name
- Acianthera gracilisepala (Brade) Luer

Synonyms
- Homotypic Synonyms: Pleurothallis gracilisepala Brade; Heterotypic Synonyms: Acianthera antennata (Garay) Pridgeon & M.W.Chase; Pleurothallis antennata Garay

= Acianthera gracilisepala =

Species of orchid

Acianthera gracilisepala is a species of flowering plant in the orchid family, Orchidaceae. It is endemic to South and Southeast Brazil.
