= Philodendron acutifolium =

Scientific classification
- Kingdom: Plantae
- Clade: Tracheophytes
- Clade: Angiosperms
- Clade: Monocots
- Order: Alismatales
- Family: Araceae
- Genus: Philodendron
- Species: P. acutifolium

Binomial name
- Philodendron acutifolium K.Krause

Species of plant

Philodendron acutifolium, the sharp-leaved philodendron, is a species of flowering plant in the family Araceae. It is native to southeastern Colombia, Ecuador, and Peru. An epiphytic climber that can also form clumps, its adaptability has led to its use as an indoor and outdoor ornamental plant.
