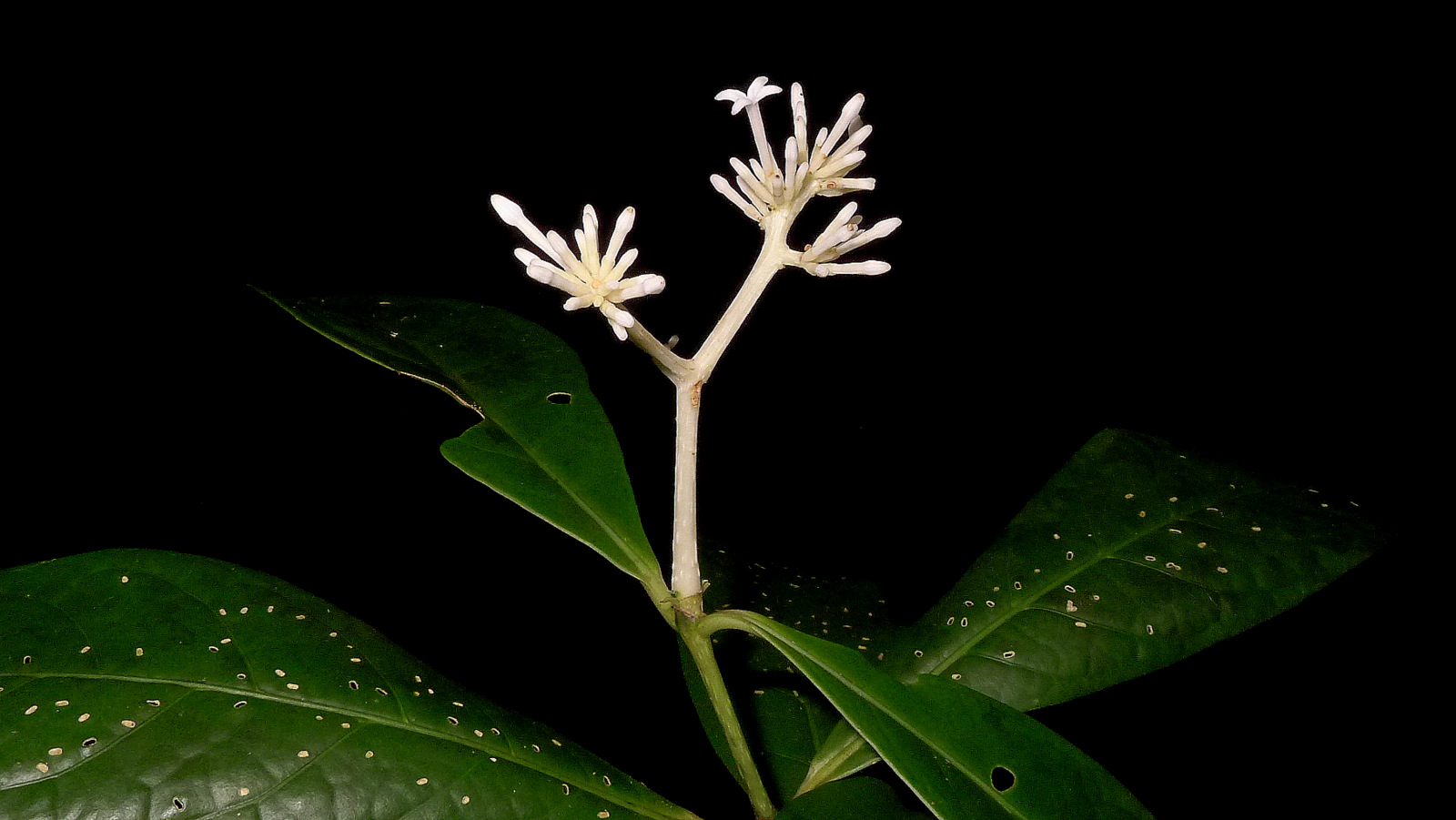
- Coussarea albescens

Scientific classification
- Kingdom: Plantae
- Clade: Embryophytes
- Clade: Tracheophytes
- Clade: Spermatophytes
- Clade: Angiosperms
- Clade: Eudicots
- Clade: Asterids
- Order: Gentianales
- Family: Rubiaceae
- Subfamily: Rubioideae
- Tribe: Coussareeae
- Genus: Coussarea; Aubl.

Type species
- Coussarea violacea Aubl.

Synonyms
- Billardiera Vahl; Froelichia Vahl; Pecheya Scop; Peckeya Raf.

= Coussarea =

Genus of flowering plants

Coussarea is a genus of flowering plants in the family Rubiaceae. The genus is found from southern Mexico to tropical America.

There are about 120 species. They are shrubs and trees with oppositely arranged leaves and large, showy white flowers with four lobes. The flowers are often fragrant.

== Species ==
- Coussarea accedens Müll.Arg.
- Coussarea acuminata (Ruiz & Pav.) Zappi
- Coussarea albescens (DC.) Müll.Arg.
- Coussarea amapaensis Steyerm.
- Coussarea ampla Müll.Arg.
- Coussarea amplifolia C.M.Taylor
- Coussarea andrei M.S.Pereira & M.R.V.Barbosa
- Coussarea antioquiana C.M.Taylor
- Coussarea auriculata Standl.
- Coussarea bahiensis Müll.Arg.
- Coussarea bernardii Steyerm.
- Coussarea biflora (Vell.) Müll.Arg.
- Coussarea bocainae M.Gomes
- Coussarea brevicaulis K.Krause
- Coussarea brevipedunculata C.M.Taylor
- Coussarea capitata (Benth.) Müll.Arg.
- Coussarea caroliana Standl.
- Coussarea catingana Müll.Arg.
- Coussarea cephaeloides C.M.Taylor
- Coussarea cerroazulensis Dwyer & M.V.Hayden
- Coussarea chiapensis Borhidi
- Coussarea coffeoides Müll.Arg.
- Coussarea congestiflora Müll.Arg.
- Coussarea contracta (Walp.) Benth. & Hook.f. ex Müll.Arg.
- Coussarea cuatrecasasii Standl. ex Steyerm.
- Coussarea curvigemma Dwyer
- Coussarea duckei Standl.
- Coussarea dulcifolia D.Neill
- Coussarea duplex C.M.Taylor
- Coussarea durifolia Dwyer
- Coussarea ecuadorensis C.M.Taylor
- Coussarea enneantha Standl.
- Coussarea evoluta Steyerm.
- Coussarea fanshawei Steyerm.
- Coussarea flava Poepp.
- Coussarea friburgensis M.Gomes
- Coussarea frondosa S.Moore
- Coussarea garciae Standl.
- Coussarea graciliflora (Mart.) Müll.Arg.
- Coussarea grandifolia Rusby
- Coussarea grandis Müll.Arg.
- Coussarea granvillei Delprete & B.M.Boom
- Coussarea hallei Steyerm.
- Coussarea hirticalyx Standl.
- Coussarea hyacinthiflora Standl.
- Coussarea hydrangeifolia (Benth.) Benth. & Hook.f. ex Müll.Arg.
- Coussarea ilheotica Müll.Arg.
- Coussarea imitans L.O.Williams
- Coussarea impetiolaris Donn.Sm.
- Coussarea insignis Ducke
- Coussarea janeirensis Standl.
- Coussarea japurana Standl.
- Coussarea klugii Steyerm.
- Coussarea krukovii Standl.
- Coussarea lagoensis Müll.Arg.
- Coussarea lanceolata (Vell.) Müll.Arg.
- Coussarea lasseri Steyerm.
- Coussarea latifolia Standl.
- Coussarea leptoloba (Spreng. ex Benth. & Hook.f.) Müll.Arg.
- Coussarea leptophagma Müll.Arg.
- Coussarea leptopus Müll.Arg.
- Coussarea liesneri Steyerm.
- Coussarea liliiflora Standl.
- Coussarea linearis C.M.Taylor
- Coussarea locuples Standl.
- Coussarea loftonii (Dwyer & M.V.Hayden) Dwyer
- Coussarea longiacuminata Standl.
- Coussarea longiflora (Mart.) Müll.Arg.
- Coussarea longifolia Müll.Arg.
- Coussarea longilaciniata Delprete
- Coussarea machadoana Standl.
- Coussarea macrocalyx Standl.
- Coussarea macrophylla (Mart.) Müll.Arg.
- Coussarea mapourioides Bremek.
- Coussarea megalocarpa Standl.
- Coussarea megistophylla Standl.
- Coussarea meridionalis (Vell.) Müll.Arg.
- Coussarea mexicana Standl.
- Coussarea micrococca Bremek.
- Coussarea moritziana (Benth.) Standl.
- Coussarea nodosa (Benth.) Müll.Arg.
- Coussarea obliqua Standl.
- Coussarea obscura Müll.Arg.
- Coussarea ovalis Standl.
- Coussarea paniculata (Vahl) Standl.
- Coussarea penetantha Standl.
- Coussarea petiolaris (Benth.) Standl.
- Coussarea pilosiflora Standl.
- Coussarea pilosula C.M.Taylor
- Coussarea pittieri Steyerm.
- Coussarea platyphylla Müll.Arg.
- Coussarea procumbens (Vell.) Müll.Arg.
- Coussarea rafa-torresii Borhidi
- Coussarea regnelliana Müll.Arg.
- Coussarea resinosa C.M.Taylor
- Coussarea revoluta Steyerm.
- Coussarea rudgeoides Rusby
- Coussarea sancti-ciprianii C.M.Taylor
- Coussarea schiffneri Zahlbr.
- Coussarea sessilifolia Standl.
- Coussarea speciosa K.Schum. ex Glaziou
- Coussarea spicata Delprete
- Coussarea spiciformis C.M.Taylor
- Coussarea strigosipes Müll.Arg.
- Coussarea surinamensis Bremek.
- Coussarea talamancana Standl.
- Coussarea tenuiflora Standl.
- Coussarea terepaimensis Steyerm.
- Coussarea tortilis Standl.
- Coussarea tricephala Standl.
- Coussarea triflora Müll.Arg.
- Coussarea uniflora Gardner
- Coussarea urbaniana Standl.
- Coussarea urophylla Standl.
- Coussarea vallis Standl. ex Steyerm.
- Coussarea venosa Standl.
- Coussarea veraguensis Dwyer
- Coussarea verticillata Müll.Arg.
- Coussarea violacea Aubl.
- Coussarea viridis Müll.Arg.
