= Palicourea latifolia =

Conservation status
- Least Concern (IUCN 3.1)

Scientific classification
- Kingdom: Plantae
- Clade: Tracheophytes
- Clade: Angiosperms
- Clade: Eudicots
- Clade: Asterids
- Order: Gentianales
- Family: Rubiaceae
- Genus: Palicourea
- Species: P. latifolia

Binomial name
- Palicourea latifolia K.Krause

Species of plant

Palicourea latifolia is a species of flowering plant in the family Rubiaceae, endemic to Peru.
