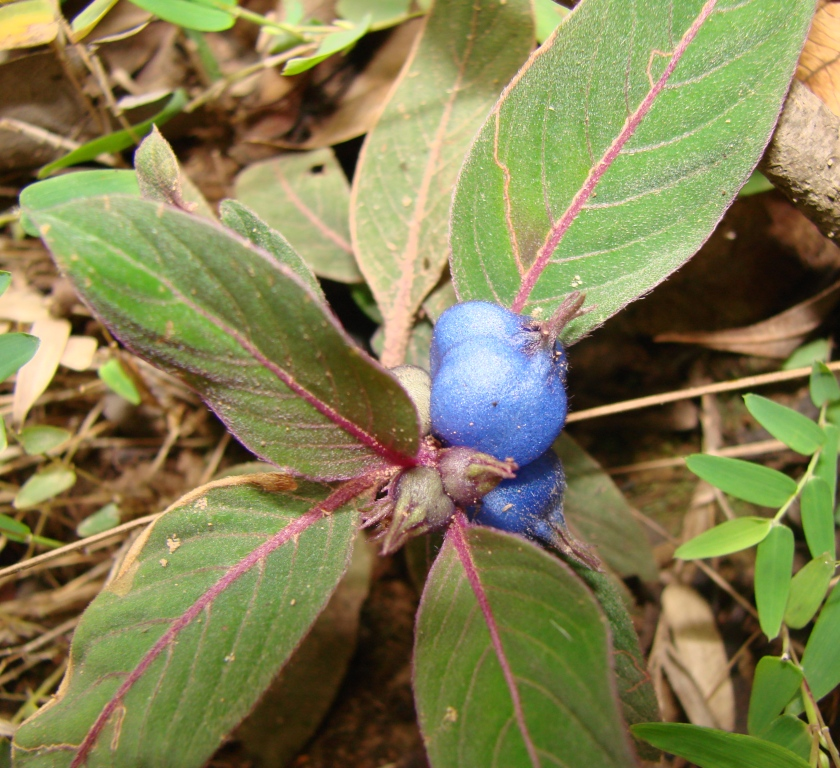
- Coccocypselum lanceolatum

Scientific classification
- Kingdom: Plantae
- Clade: Embryophytes
- Clade: Tracheophytes
- Clade: Angiosperms
- Clade: Eudicots
- Clade: Asterids
- Order: Gentianales
- Family: Rubiaceae
- Subfamily: Rubioideae
- Tribe: Coussareeae
- Genus: Coccocypselum; P.Browne

Type species
- Coccocypselum repens Sw.

Synonyms
- Bellardia Schreb.; Cococipsilum J.St.-Hill.; Condalia Ruiz & Pav.; Lipostoma D.Don; Sicelium P.Browne; Tontanea Aubl.

= Coccocypselum =

Genus of flowering plants in the coffee family

Coccocypselum is a genus of flowering plants in the family Rubiaceae. It is native to Mexico, Central America, the West Indies and South America. All species of the genus Coccocypselum are herbaceous with fleshy, blue or purple fruits, and 4-petaled flowers.

== Species ==
- Coccocypselum anomalum K.Schum. – Brazil
- Coccocypselum aureum (Spreng.) Cham. & Schltdl. – from Cuba and Costa Rica south to Paraguay
- Coccocypselum bahiense C.B.Costa – Brazil (Bahia)
- Coccocypselum brevipetiolatum Steyerm. – Venezuela, Bolivia, Colombia, Peru
- Coccocypselum capitatum (Graham) C.B.Costa & Mamede – Brazil
- Coccocypselum condalia Pers. – from Trinidad and Costa Rica south to Paraguay
- Coccocypselum cordifolium Nees & Mart. – from Cuba and Veracruz (in eastern Mexico) south to Paraguay
- Coccocypselum erythrocephalum Cham. & Schltdl. – Brazil, Paraguay
- Coccocypselum geophiloides Wawra – Brazil
- Coccocypselum glaberrimum Hadac – Cuba
- Coccocypselum glabrifolium Standl. – Brazil
- Coccocypselum guianense (Aubl.) K.Schum. – from Cuba and Tabasco (in southern Mexico) south to Paraguay
- Coccocypselum hasslerianum Chodat – Bolivia, Paraguay, Brazil, Argentina
- Coccocypselum herbaceum P.Browne ex Aubl. – Mexico (Chiapas), Central America, Cuba, Jamaica, Venezuela, Colombia, Hispaniola, Guyana
- Coccocypselum hirsutum Bartl. ex DC. – from Trinidad and Mexico south to Brazil
- Coccocypselum hispidulum (Standl.) Standl. – Costa Rica, Nicaragua, Panama, Colombia
- Coccocypselum lanceolatum (Ruiz & Pav.) Pers. – from Cuba and Guatemala south to Paraguay
- Coccocypselum lymansmithii Standl. – Brazil, Paraguay
- Coccocypselum oblongatum Urb. – Cuba
- Coccocypselum ovatum Cham. & Schltdl. – Brazil (possibly extinct)
- Coccocypselum pedunculare Cham. & Schltdl. – Brazil
- Coccocypselum pulchellum Cham. – Brazil, Argentina
