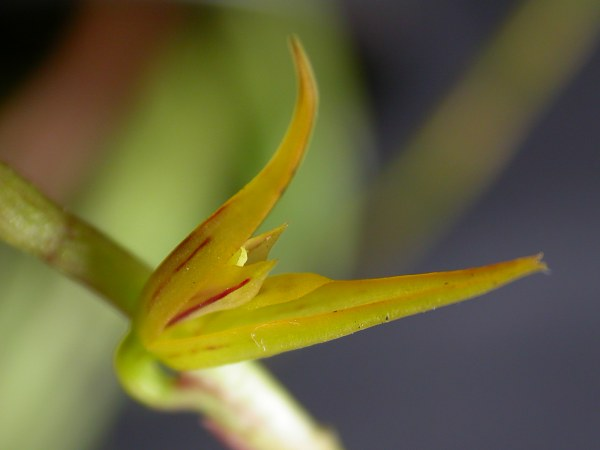

Scientific classification
- Kingdom: Plantae
- Clade: Tracheophytes
- Clade: Angiosperms
- Clade: Monocots
- Order: Asparagales
- Family: Orchidaceae
- Subfamily: Epidendroideae
- Genus: Acianthera
- Species: A. adamantinensis

Binomial name
- Acianthera adamantinensis (Brade) F.Barros (2002)

Synonyms
- Pleurothallis adamantinensis Brade (1939) (Basionym)

= Acianthera adamantinensis =

Species of orchid

Acianthera adamantinensis is a species of flowering plant in the family Orchidaceae. It is endemic to Southeast Brazil.
