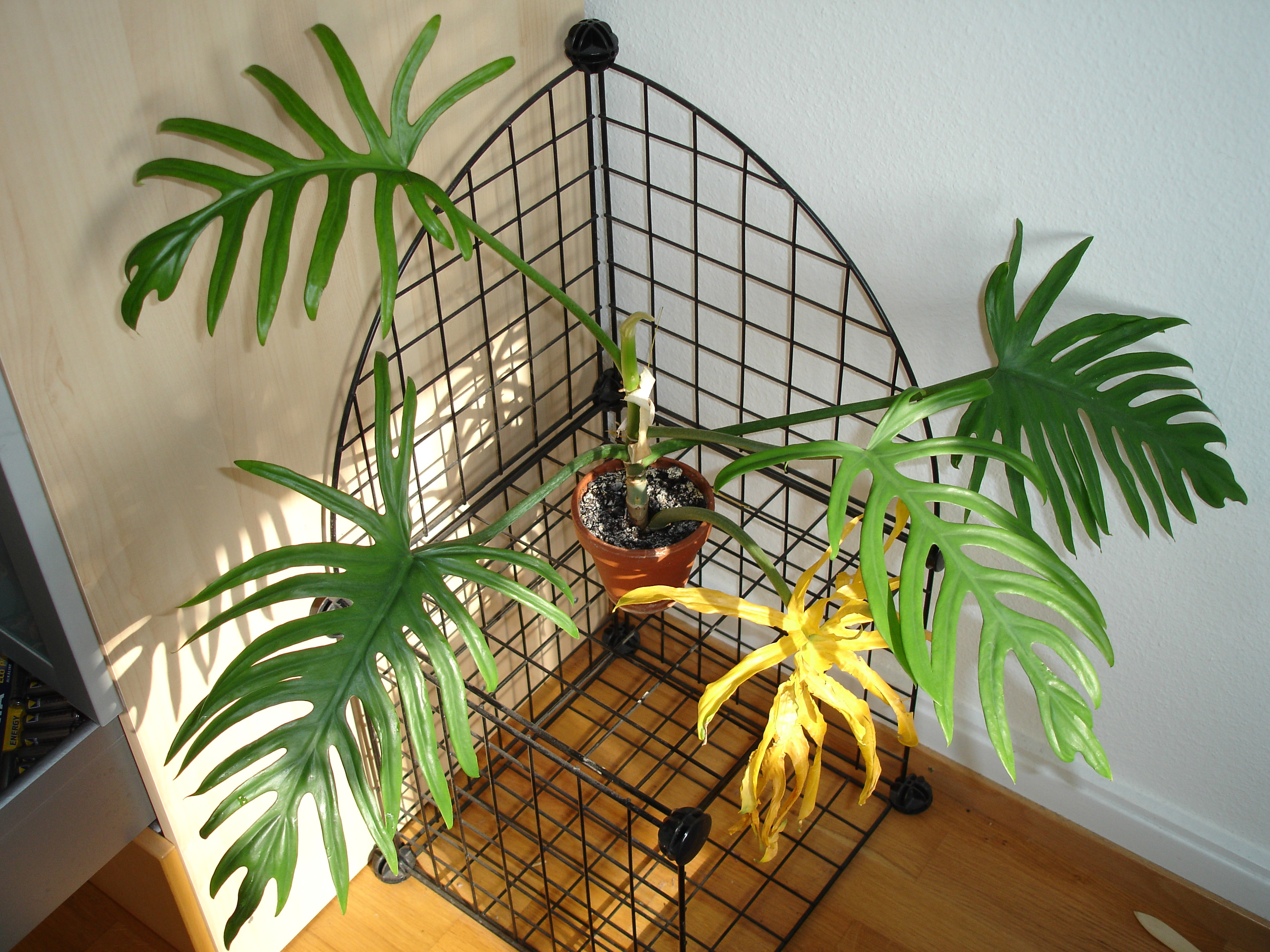
- As a houseplant
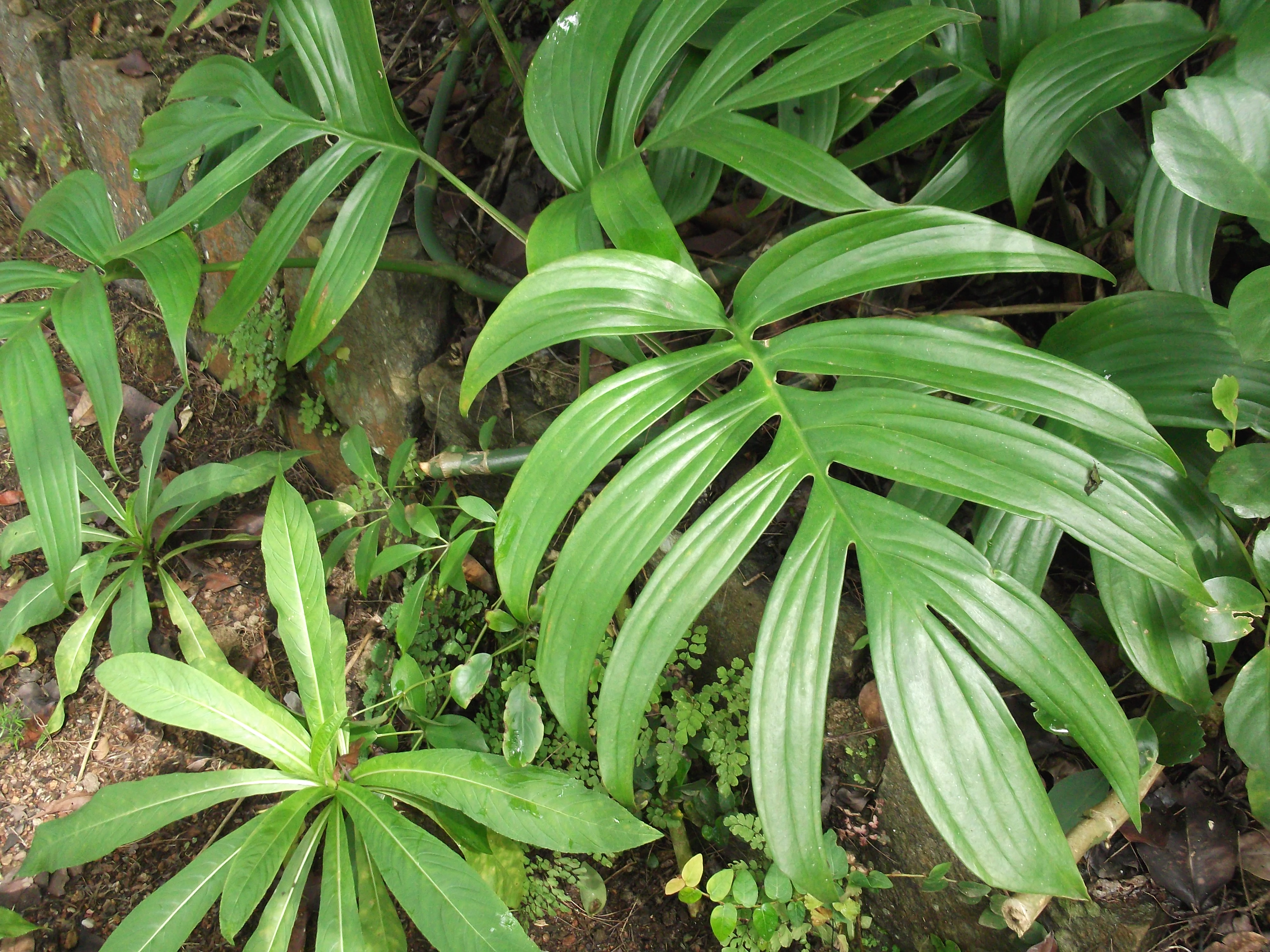

Scientific classification
- Kingdom: Plantae
- Clade: Tracheophytes
- Clade: Angiosperms
- Clade: Monocots
- Order: Alismatales
- Family: Araceae
- Genus: Philodendron
- Species: P. elegans

Binomial name
- Philodendron elegans K.Krause

= Philodendron elegans =

Species of plant

Philodendron elegans is a species of flowering plant in the family Araceae, native to Colombia. A climber capable of reaching 4.6 m (15 ft) as a houseplant, it is can be found clambering up to the canopy in wet tropical forests. It may be available from specialty suppliers.
