= P. candida =

P. candida may refer to:

- Palicourea candida, a plant species endemic to Ecuador
- Partula candida, an extinct gastropod species endemic to French Polynesia
- Piperia candida, the whiteflower rein orchid, slender white piperia or white-flowered piperia, an orchid species native to western North America from Alaska to the San Francisco Bay Area

== See also ==
- Candida (disambiguation)
