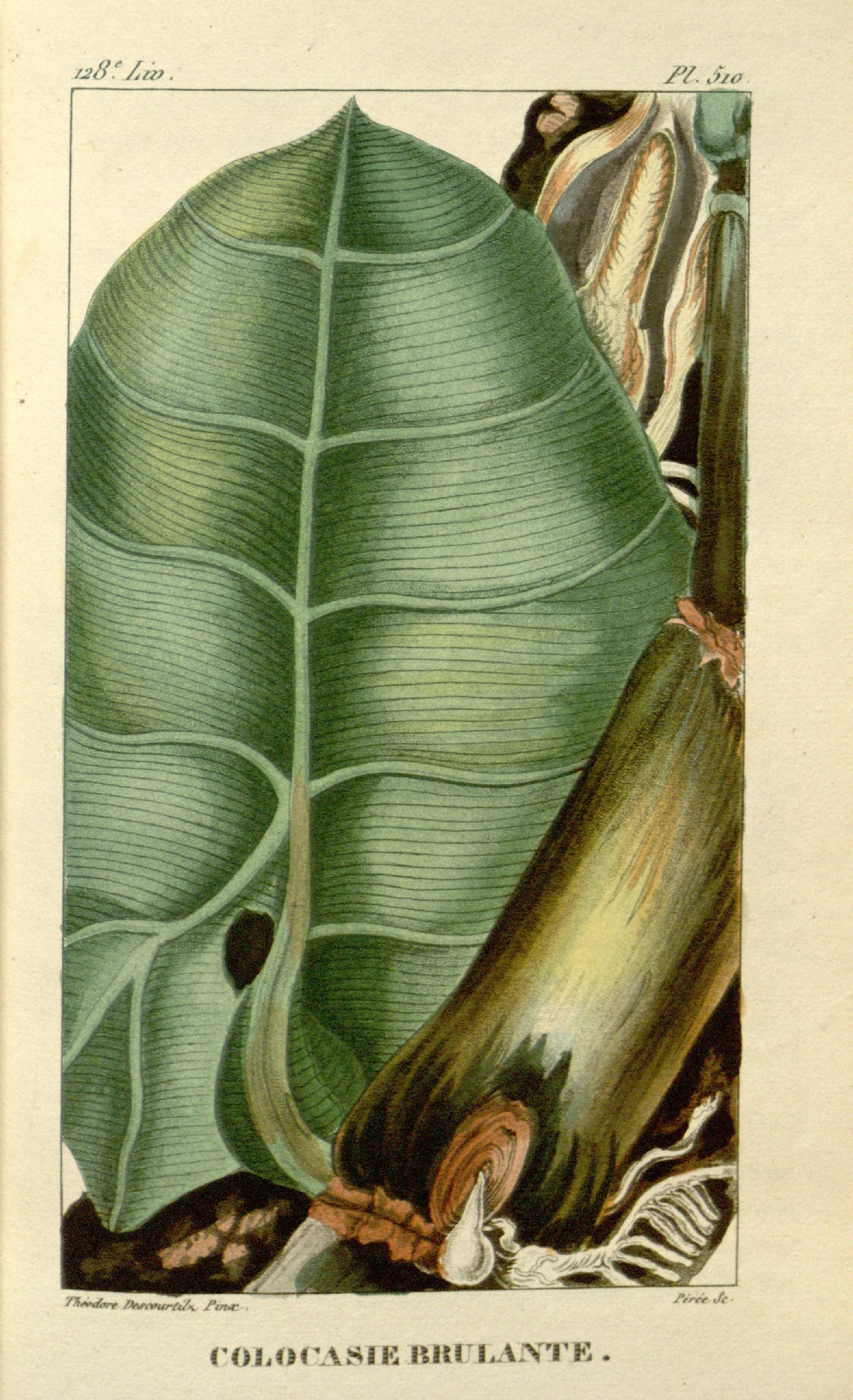

Scientific classification
- Kingdom: Plantae
- Clade: Tracheophytes
- Clade: Angiosperms
- Clade: Monocots
- Order: Alismatales
- Family: Araceae
- Genus: Philodendron
- Species: P. consanguineum

Binomial name
- Philodendron consanguineum Schott, 1856

Synonyms
- Philodendron wrightii Griseb. Philodendron urbanianum K.Krause; Philodendron marginatum Urb. Philodendron krebsii Schott; Philodendron fuertesii K.Krause; Philodendron angustatum Schott

= Philodendron consanguineum =

Species of flowering plant

Philodendron consanguineum, the rascagarganta, is a flowering plant belonging to the genus Philodendron. It was first described by Heinrich Wilhelm Schott.
