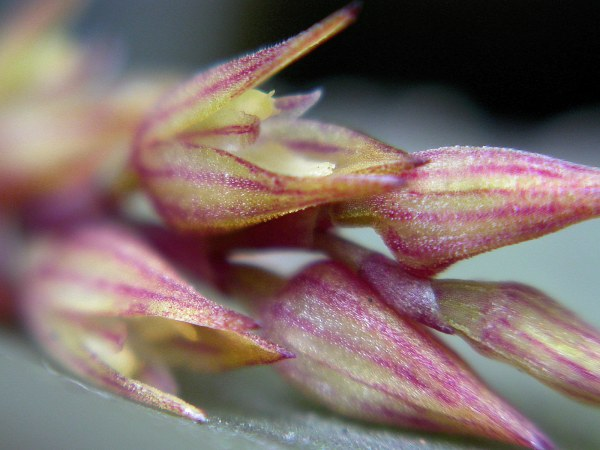

Scientific classification
- Kingdom: Plantae
- Clade: Tracheophytes
- Clade: Angiosperms
- Clade: Monocots
- Order: Asparagales
- Family: Orchidaceae
- Subfamily: Epidendroideae
- Genus: Acianthera
- Species: A. limae

Binomial name
- Acianthera limae (Porto & Brade) Pridgeon & M.W.Chase

Synonyms
- Pleurothallis limae Porto & Brade (1940) (basionym)

= Acianthera limae =

Species of orchid

Acianthera limae is a species of flowering plant in the orchid family, Orchidaceae. It is endemic to Southeast Brazil.
