= Acianthera caparaoensis =

Scientific classification
- Kingdom: Plantae
- Clade: Tracheophytes
- Clade: Angiosperms
- Clade: Monocots
- Order: Asparagales
- Family: Orchidaceae
- Subfamily: Epidendroideae
- Genus: Acianthera
- Species: A. caparaoensis

Binomial name
- Acianthera caparaoensis (Brade) Pridgeon & M.W.Chase

Synonyms
- Pleurothallis caparaoensis Brade; Specklinia caparaoensis (Brade) Luer

Species of orchid

Acianthera caparaoensis is a species of flowering plant in the orchid family, Orchidaceae. It is endemic to Southeast Brazil. It was first formally named Pleurothallis caparoensis in 1943 and transferred to the genus Acianthera in 2001.
