= Palicourea sodiroi =

Conservation status
- Vulnerable (IUCN 3.1)

Scientific classification
- Kingdom: Plantae
- Clade: Tracheophytes
- Clade: Angiosperms
- Clade: Eudicots
- Clade: Asterids
- Order: Gentianales
- Family: Rubiaceae
- Genus: Palicourea
- Species: P. sodiroi

Binomial name
- Palicourea sodiroi Standl.

Species of plant

Palicourea sodiroi is a species of plant in the family Rubiaceae. It is a shrub and grows primarily in wet tropical habitats. It is endemic to Ecuador.

The specific epithet of sodiroi refers to Luis Sodiro (1836–1909), who was an Italian Jesuit priest and a field botanist, who collected many plants in Ecuador.

It was first published in Publ. Field Mus. Nat. Hist., Bot. Ser. vol.22 on page 198 in 1940.
