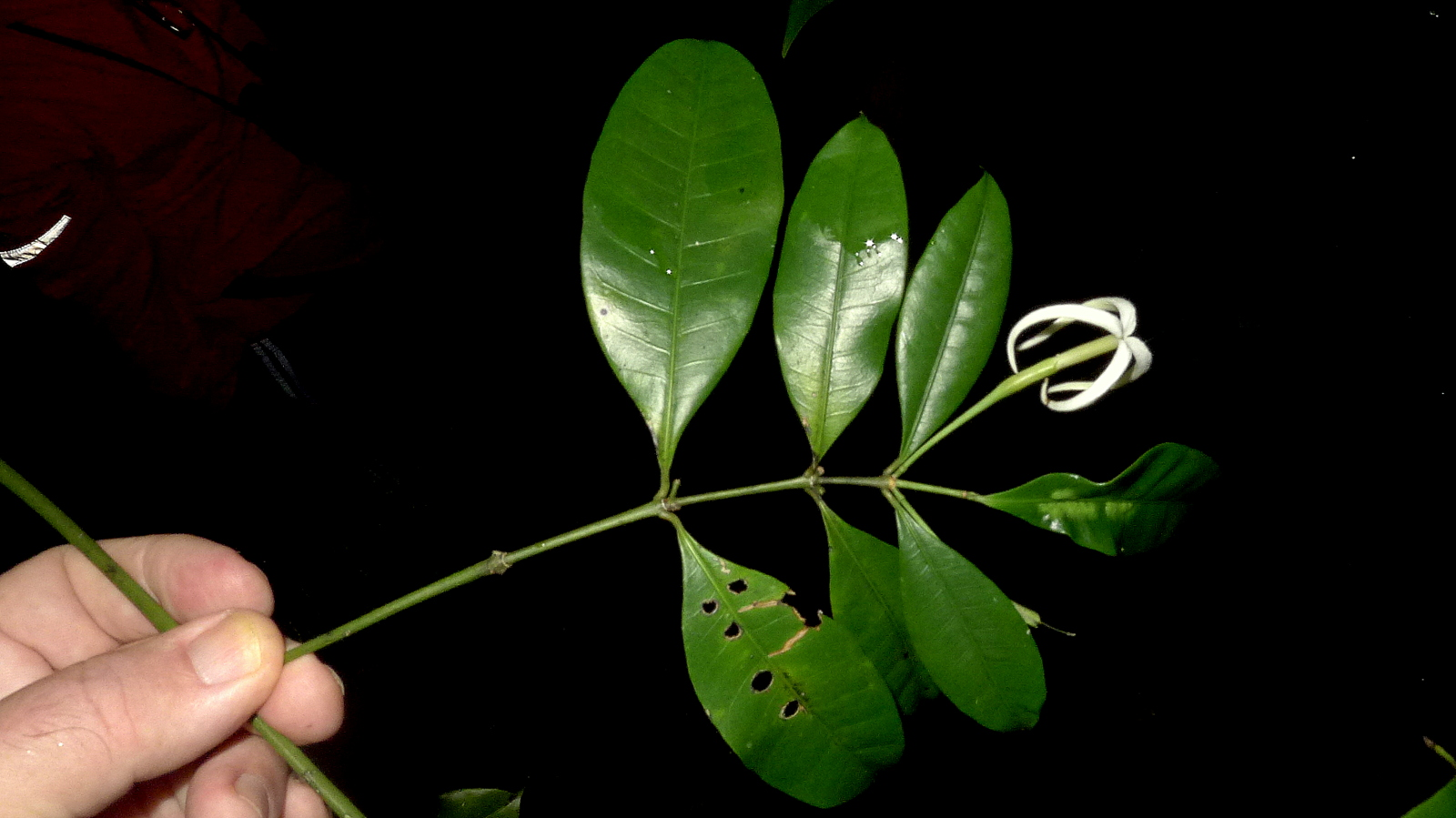
- Faramea biflora

Scientific classification
- Kingdom: Plantae
- Clade: Tracheophytes
- Clade: Angiosperms
- Clade: Eudicots
- Clade: Asterids
- Order: Gentianales
- Family: Rubiaceae
- Subfamily: Rubioideae
- Tribe: Coussareeae
- Genus: Faramea; Aubl.

= Faramea =

Genus of plants

Faramea is a genus of plants in the family Rubiaceae.

Species include:

- F. angusta C. M. Taylor
- F. biflora J. G. Jardim & Zappi
- F. capillipes
- F. exemplaris Standl.
- F. hymenocalyx M. Gomes
- F. luteovirens
- F. nocturna J. G. Jardim & Zappi
- F. oligantha Müll. Arg.
- F. paratiensis M. Gomes
- F. picinguabae M. Gomes
- F. quadricostata
- F. vasquezii C. M. Taylor
