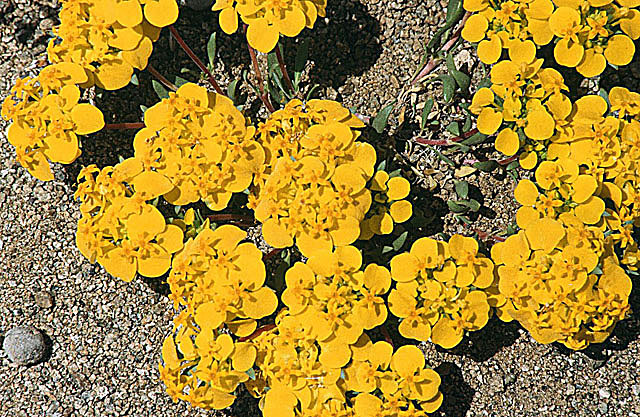
- Cruckshanksia montiana

Scientific classification
- Kingdom: Plantae
- Clade: Tracheophytes
- Clade: Angiosperms
- Clade: Eudicots
- Clade: Asterids
- Order: Gentianales
- Family: Rubiaceae
- Subfamily: Rubioideae
- Tribe: Coussareeae
- Genus: Cruckshanksia; Hook. & Arn.

Type species
- Cruckshanksia hymenodon Hook. & Arn.

Synonyms
- Rotheria Meyen

= Cruckshanksia =

Genus of plants

Cruckshanksia is a genus of flowering plants in the family Rubiaceae. The genus is found in Argentina and Chile.

There are seven species in the genus. They are herbs and shrubs that grow in the Atacama Desert and the Andes. They have yellow or pink flower corollas and white or colored petal-like sepals. Cruckshanksia pumila is an annual species that grows in dry regions and only appears after rare rain events; it is generally seen every three to five years during El Niño.

== Species ==
- Cruckshanksia hymenodon Hook. & Arn.
- Cruckshanksia lithiophila Ricardi
- Cruckshanksia macrantha Phil.
- Cruckshanksia montiana Clos
- Cruckshanksia palmae Clos
- Cruckshanksia pumila Clos
- Cruckshanksia verticillata Phil.
