= Palicourea wilesii =

Conservation status
- Vulnerable (IUCN 2.3)

Scientific classification
- Kingdom: Plantae
- Clade: Tracheophytes
- Clade: Angiosperms
- Clade: Eudicots
- Clade: Asterids
- Order: Gentianales
- Family: Rubiaceae
- Genus: Palicourea
- Species: P. wilesii

Binomial name
- Palicourea wilesii Adams

Species of plant

Palicourea wilesii is a species of plant in the family Rubiaceae. It is endemic to Jamaica. It is threatened by habitat loss.

The species is native to Jamaica. No subspecies are listed in the Catalogue of Life.
