= Palicourea microcarpa =

Conservation status
- Vulnerable (IUCN 2.3)

Scientific classification
- Kingdom: Plantae
- Clade: Tracheophytes
- Clade: Angiosperms
- Clade: Eudicots
- Clade: Asterids
- Order: Gentianales
- Family: Rubiaceae
- Genus: Palicourea
- Species: P. microcarpa

Binomial name
- Palicourea microcarpa (Ruiz & Pav.) Zappi

Synonyms
- Coffea bidentata D.Dietr.; Coffea microcarpa Ruiz & Pav.; Psychotria yungasensis Rusby; Rudgea microcarpa (Ruiz & Pav.) Standl.

Species of plant

Palicourea microcarpa, is a species of flowering plant in the family Rubiaceae. It is native to Bolivia and Peru.

== Conservation ==
Rudgea microcarpa was assessed as "vulnerable" in the 1998 IUCN Red List, where it is said to be native only to Peru. As of March 2023, R. microcarpa was regarded as a synonym of Palicourea microcarpa, which has a wider distribution that includes Bolivia.
