= Declieuxia =

Scientific classification
- Kingdom: Plantae
- Clade: Tracheophytes
- Clade: Angiosperms
- Clade: Eudicots
- Clade: Asterids
- Order: Gentianales
- Family: Rubiaceae
- Subfamily: Rubioideae
- Tribe: Coussareeae
- Genus: Declieuxia; Kunth

Type species
- Declieuxia chiococcoides (syn. of Declieuxia fruticosa) Kunth

Synonyms
- Congdonia Jeps.

Genus of plants

Declieuxia is a genus of flowering plants in the family Rubiaceae. The genus is found in tropical America.

== Species ==
- Declieuxia aspalathoides Müll.Arg.
- Declieuxia cacuminis Müll.Arg.
- Declieuxia coerulea Gardner
- Declieuxia cordigera Mart. ex Zucc.
- Declieuxia dasyphylla K.Schum. ex Steyerm.
- Declieuxia decumbens J.H.Kirkbr.
- Declieuxia deltoidea Müll.Arg.
- Declieuxia diamantinae J.H.Kirkbr.
- Declieuxia diantheroides Standl.
- Declieuxia dusenii Standl.
- Declieuxia fruticosa (Willd. ex Roem. & Schult.) Kuntze
- Declieuxia gracilis J.H.Kirkbr.
- Declieuxia hatschbachii J.H.Kirkbr.
- Declieuxia humilis (Müll.Arg.) J.H.Kirkbr.
- Declieuxia irwinii J.H.Kirkbr.
- Declieuxia juniperina A.St.-Hil.
- Declieuxia lancifolia J.H.Kirkbr.
- Declieuxia leiophylla Müll.Arg.
- Declieuxia lysimachioides Zucc.
- Declieuxia marioides Mart. ex Zucc.
- Declieuxia muscosa A.St.-Hil.
- Declieuxia oenanthoides Mart. ex Zucc.
- Declieuxia passerina Mart. ex Zucc.
- Declieuxia pruinosa Pohl ex DC.
- Declieuxia rhexioides Mart. ex Zucc.
- Declieuxia saturejoides Mart. ex Zucc.
- Declieuxia spergulifolia Mart. ex Zucc.
- Declieuxia tenuiflora (Willd. ex Roem. & Schult.) Steyerm. & J.H.Kirkbr.
- Declieuxia verticillata Müll.Arg.
