= Standleya =

Scientific classification
- Kingdom: Plantae
- Clade: Tracheophytes
- Clade: Angiosperms
- Clade: Eudicots
- Clade: Asterids
- Order: Gentianales
- Family: Rubiaceae
- Genus: Standleya; Brade

Genus of plants

Standleya is a genus of flowering plants belonging to the family Rubiaceae.

It is native to eastern Brazil.

The genus name of Standleya is in honour of Paul Carpenter Standley (1884–1963), an American botanist. It was first described and published in Arq. Mus. Nac. Rio de Janeiro Vol.34 on page 119 in 1932.

== Known species ==
According to Kew:

- Standleya erecta Brade
- Standleya glomerulata J.G.Jardim & C.B.Costa
- Standleya kuhlmannii Brade
- Standleya limae Brade
- Standleya prostrata (K.Schum.) Brade
