= Faramea exemplaris =

Conservation status
- Vulnerable (IUCN 3.1)

Scientific classification
- Kingdom: Plantae
- Clade: Tracheophytes
- Clade: Angiosperms
- Clade: Eudicots
- Clade: Asterids
- Order: Gentianales
- Family: Rubiaceae
- Genus: Faramea
- Species: F. exemplaris

Binomial name
- Faramea exemplaris Standl.

Species of plant

Faramea exemplaris is a species of plant in the family Rubiaceae. It is endemic to Peru.
