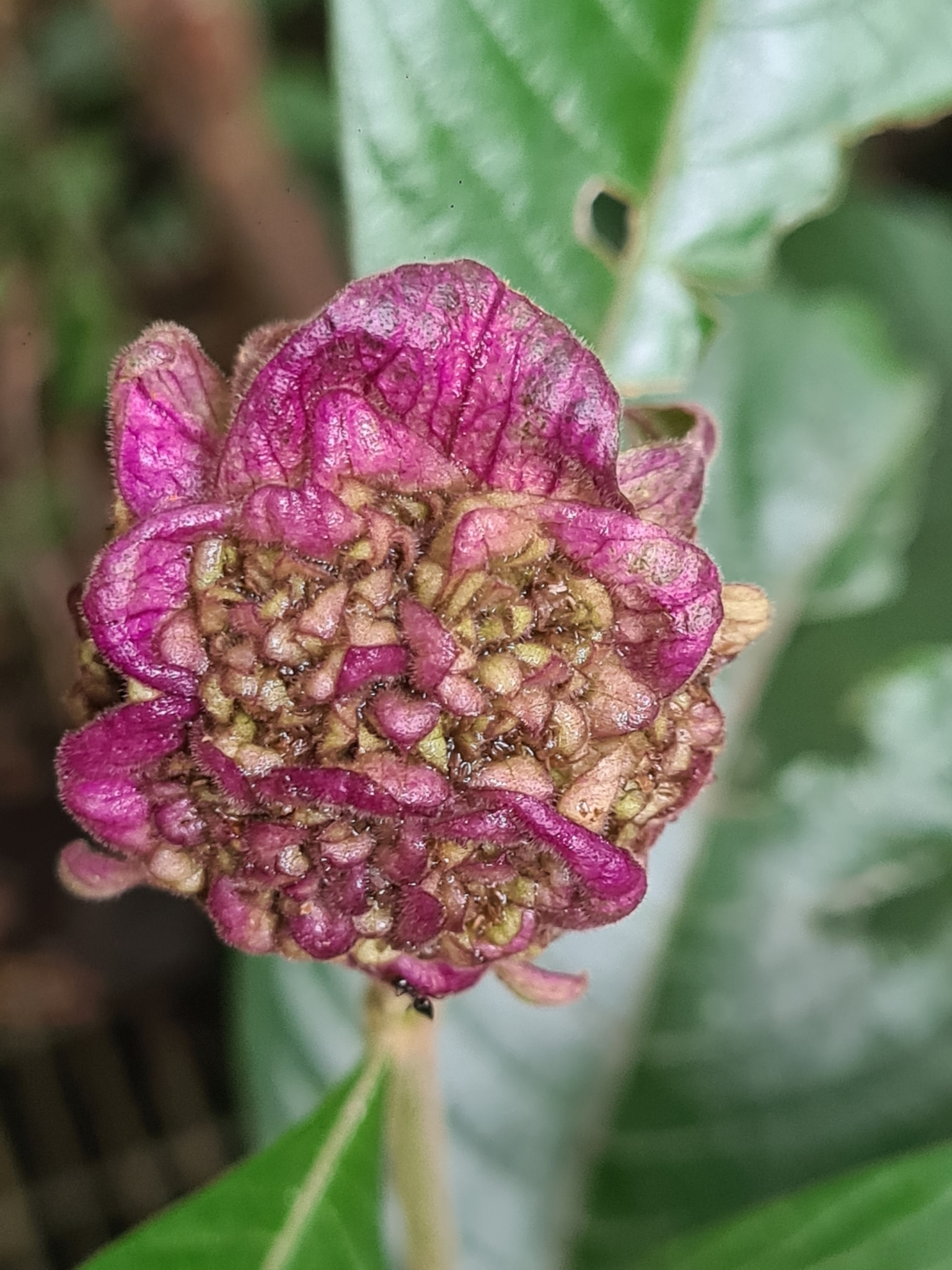

Scientific classification
- Kingdom: Plantae
- Clade: Tracheophytes
- Clade: Angiosperms
- Clade: Eudicots
- Clade: Asterids
- Order: Gentianales
- Family: Rubiaceae
- Genus: Palicourea
- Species: P. bracteocardia

Binomial name
- Palicourea bracteocardia (DC.) Delprete & J.H.Kirkbr.
- Distribution Native range

= Palicourea bracteocardia =

Species of plant

Palicourea bracteocardia is a species of shrub from the genus Palicourea.

== Distribution ==
Palicourea bracteocardia is described as being found in Brazil, Colombia, French Guiana, Guyana, Suriname and Trinidad and Tobago. Recordings by various citizen science initiatives confirm this, but also suggest that the species can also be found in Venezuela.

== Taxonomy ==
Palicourea bracteocardia is a taxon name that is a combinatio nova from 2016. This means the species was described earlier but restructured into the genus Palicouria. Previously, the species was thought to be part of the genera Cephaelis or Uragoga.
