= Faramea luteovirens =

Scientific classification
- Kingdom: Plantae
- Clade: Tracheophytes
- Clade: Angiosperms
- Clade: Eudicots
- Clade: Asterids
- Order: Gentianales
- Family: Rubiaceae
- Genus: Faramea
- Species: F. luteovirens

Binomial name
- Faramea luteovirens Standl.

Species of plant

Faramea luteovirens is a shrub in the family Rubiaceae found in Panama and northern Colombia. Its common name is huesito or benjamin. Each seasonal twig makes exactly two small, oval opposite leaves and three buds for the next flush of growth. The flowers and fruit are in cymes.
