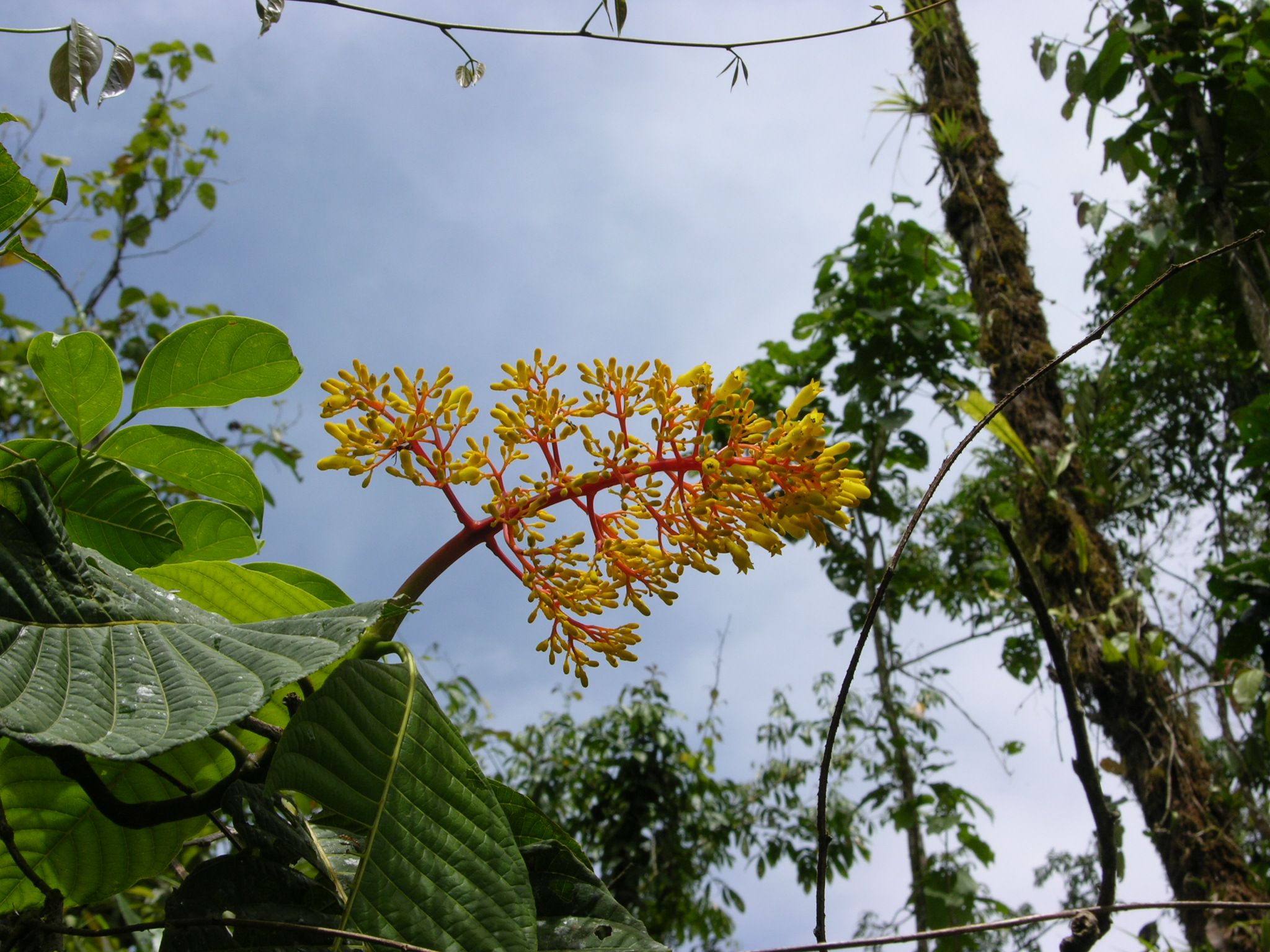
- Foreground: leaves and inflorescence of unidentified Palicourea species

Scientific classification
- Kingdom: Plantae
- Clade: Tracheophytes
- Clade: Angiosperms
- Clade: Eudicots
- Clade: Asterids
- Order: Gentianales
- Family: Rubiaceae
- Subfamily: Rubioideae
- Tribe: Palicoureeae
- Genus: Palicourea; Aubl. (1775)

Species
- 694, see text

Synonyms
- Colladonia Spreng. (1824); Mexocarpus Borhidi, E.Martínez & Ramos (2015); Nonatelia Aubl. (1775); Oribasia Schreb. (1789); Rhodostoma Scheidw. (1842); Stephanium Schreb. (1789)

= Palicourea =

Genus of plants

Palicourea is a genus of flowering plants in the family Rubiaceae. It contains 694 species, which range from shrubs to small trees, and is distributed throughout the New World tropics.

These plants are closely related to Psychotria and in particular its subgenus Heteropsychotria. Indeed, it seems to be nothing else but a distinctively-flowered offshoot of Heteropsychotria; arguably, it would thus need to be merged into Psychotria to make that genus monophyletic. On the other hand, Psychotria is extremely diverse already, so it is probably more practical to move the more distantly related species out of this genus and merge Heteropsychotria with Palicourea. By a Hungarian botanist Attila Borhidi, some of the Psychotria species have been transferred into this genus.

The genus is not well studied. Most species are distylous, although a few on isolated Caribbean islands seem to have lost the trait. Flowers are in racemes, having no scent, and are normally pollinated by hummingbirds. Blue-black berries follow, and are thought to be distributed by birds.

Almost one-tenth of the Palicourea species are considered threatened by the IUCN, even though the conservation status has only been reviewed for those species that occur in Ecuador.

== Selected species ==
- Palicourea anderssoniana
- Palicourea anianguana
- Palicourea asplundii
- Palicourea azurea
- Palicourea bracteocardia
- Palicourea calantha
- Palicourea calothyrsus
- Palicourea calycina
- Palicourea canarina
- Palicourea candida
- Palicourea consobrina
- Palicourea corniculata
- Palicourea cornigera
- Palicourea elata (syn. Psychotria elata)
- Palicourea fuchsioides
- Palicourea gentryi
- Palicourea heilbornii
- Palicourea herrerae
- Palicourea holmgrenii
- Palicourea jaramilloi
- Palicourea lasiantha
- Palicourea lasiorrhachis
- Palicourea latifolia
- Palicourea lobbii
- Palicourea macrobotrys (Ruiz & Pav.) Schult.
- Palicourea macrocalyx
- Palicourea microcarpa (Ruiz & Pav.) Zappi
- Palicourea obovata (Ruiz & Pav.) DC.
- Palicourea padifolia
- Palicourea pilosa (Ruiz & Pav.) Borhidi
- Palicourea prodiga
- Palicourea punicea (Ruiz & Pav.) DC.
- Palicourea reticulata (Ruiz & Pav.) C.M.Taylor
- Palicourea sodiroi
- Palicourea stenosepala
- Palicourea subalatoides
- Palicourea subtomentosa (Ruiz & Pav.) C.M.Taylor
- Palicourea sulphurea (Ruiz & Pav.) DC.
- Palicourea tectoneura
- Palicourea thyrsiflora (Ruiz & Pav.) DC.
- Palicourea tomentosa (syn. Psychotria poeppigiana)
- Palicourea virgata (Ruiz & Pav.) C.M.Taylor
- Palicourea wilesii
