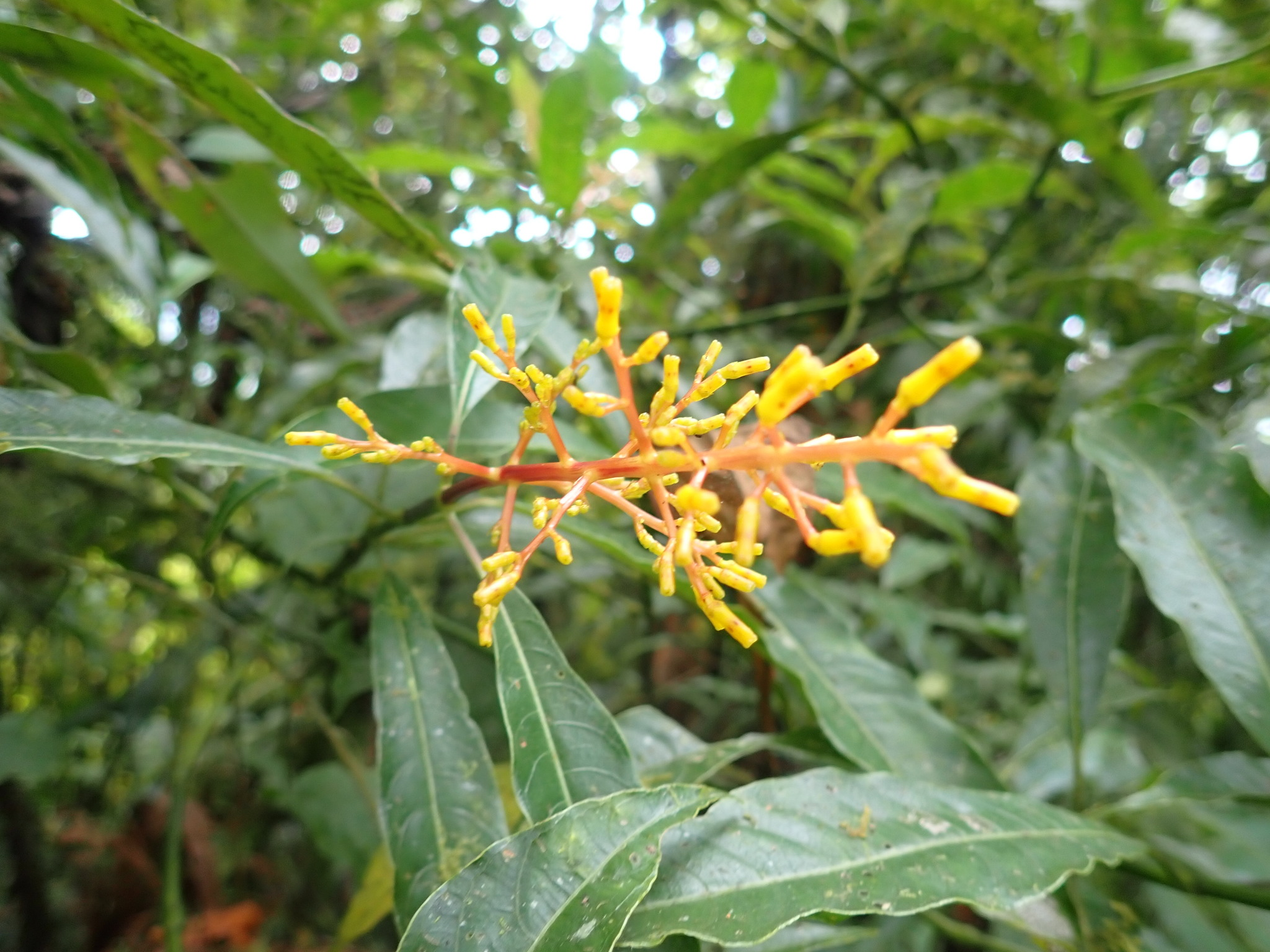

Scientific classification
- Kingdom: Plantae
- Clade: Tracheophytes
- Clade: Angiosperms
- Clade: Eudicots
- Clade: Asterids
- Order: Gentianales
- Family: Rubiaceae
- Genus: Palicourea
- Species: P. padifolia

Binomial name
- Palicourea padifolia (Willd. ex Schult.) C.M.Taylor & Lorence

= Palicourea padifolia =

Species of plant

Palicourea padifolia is a species from the genus Palicourea.
