= Palicourea herrerae =

Conservation status
- Vulnerable (IUCN 2.3)

Scientific classification
- Kingdom: Plantae
- Clade: Tracheophytes
- Clade: Angiosperms
- Clade: Eudicots
- Clade: Asterids
- Order: Gentianales
- Family: Rubiaceae
- Genus: Palicourea
- Species: P. herrerae

Binomial name
- Palicourea herrerae Standl.

Species of plant

Palicourea herrerae is a species of plant in the family Rubiaceae. It is endemic to Peru.
