= Psychotria fusiformis =

Conservation status
- Vulnerable (IUCN 3.1)

Scientific classification
- Kingdom: Plantae
- Clade: Tracheophytes
- Clade: Angiosperms
- Clade: Eudicots
- Clade: Asterids
- Order: Gentianales
- Family: Rubiaceae
- Genus: Psychotria
- Species: P. fusiformis

Binomial name
- Psychotria fusiformis C.M.Taylor

Species of plant

Psychotria fusiformis is a species of plant in the family Rubiaceae. It is endemic to Ecuador. There are two known populations of the plant remaining, one east of Tena and the other south of Canelos.
