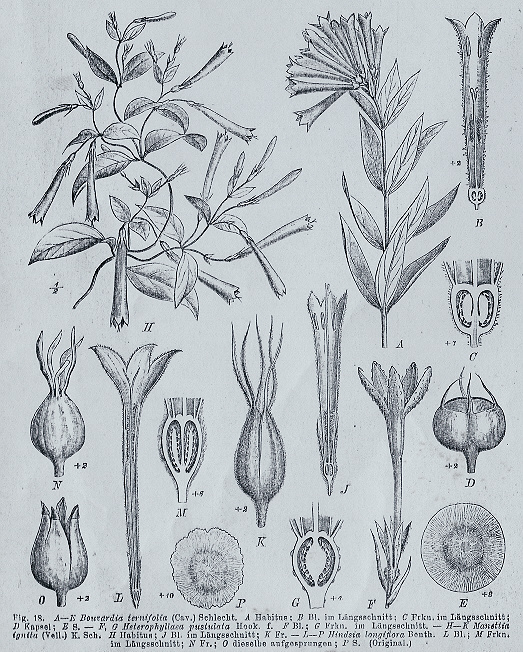
- Heterophyllaea pustulata: illustrations F-G

Scientific classification
- Kingdom: Plantae
- Clade: Tracheophytes
- Clade: Angiosperms
- Clade: Eudicots
- Clade: Asterids
- Order: Gentianales
- Family: Rubiaceae
- Subfamily: Rubioideae
- Tribe: Coussareeae
- Genus: Heterophyllaea; Hook.f.

species
- See text.

= Heterophyllaea =

Genus of plants

Heterophyllaea is a genus of two species of shrubs in the family Rubiaceae, native to Bolivia and Argentina.

Heterophyllaea pustulata also known as cegadera contains an unknown toxin that causes photosensitization in sheep and cows. It can grow to between 2 and 3 meters in height and is typically found in northwest Argentina at an altitude between 2,500 and 3,000 meters above sea level.

Species

- Heterophyllaea lycioides (Rusby) Sandwith
- Heterophyllaea pustulata Hook.f.
