= Faramea angusta =

Conservation status
- Near Threatened (IUCN 3.1)

Scientific classification
- Kingdom: Plantae
- Clade: Tracheophytes
- Clade: Angiosperms
- Clade: Eudicots
- Clade: Asterids
- Order: Gentianales
- Family: Rubiaceae
- Genus: Faramea
- Species: F. angusta

Binomial name
- Faramea angusta C.M.Taylor

Species of plant

Faramea angusta is a species of plant in the family Rubiaceae. It is endemic to Ecuador.
