= Palicourea corniculata =

Conservation status
- Vulnerable (IUCN 3.1)

Scientific classification
- Kingdom: Plantae
- Clade: Tracheophytes
- Clade: Angiosperms
- Clade: Eudicots
- Clade: Asterids
- Order: Gentianales
- Family: Rubiaceae
- Genus: Palicourea
- Species: P. corniculata

Binomial name
- Palicourea corniculata C.M.Taylor

Species of plant

Palicourea corniculata is a species of plant in the family Rubiaceae. It is endemic to Ecuador.
