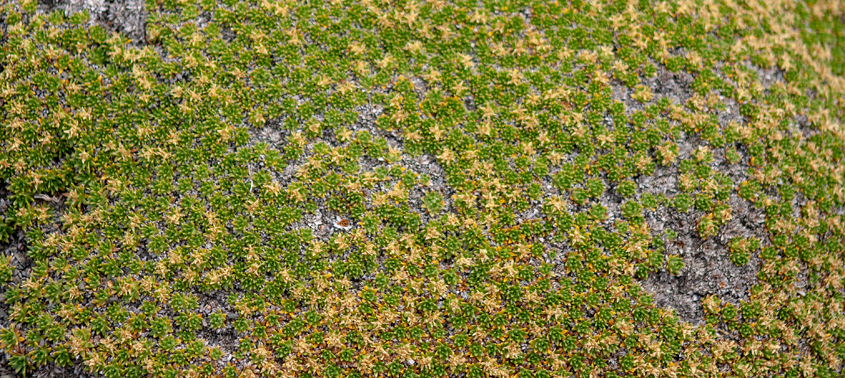

Scientific classification
- Kingdom: Plantae
- Clade: Tracheophytes
- Clade: Angiosperms
- Clade: Eudicots
- Clade: Asterids
- Order: Gentianales
- Family: Rubiaceae
- Genus: Oreopolus; Schltdl.

= Oreopolus =

Genus of plants

Oreopolus is a genus of flowering plants belonging to the family Rubiaceae.

Its native range is Temperate Southern America.

== Species ==
Species:

- Oreopolus glacialis (Poepp.) Ricardi
