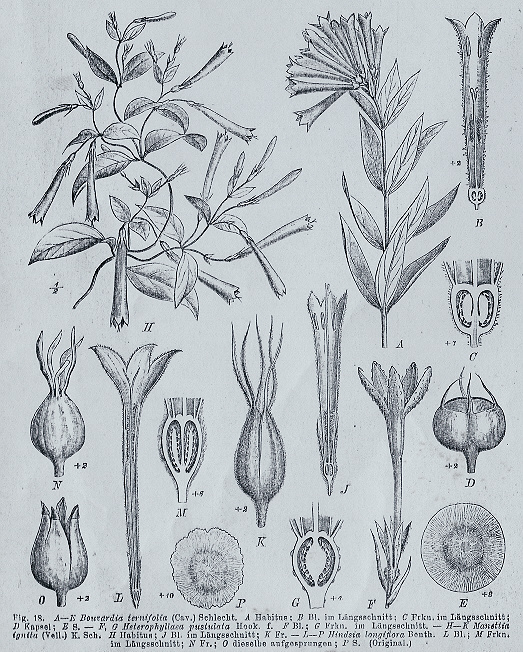
- Hindsia longiflora: illustrations L-P

Scientific classification
- Kingdom: Plantae
- Clade: Tracheophytes
- Clade: Angiosperms
- Clade: Eudicots
- Clade: Asterids
- Order: Gentianales
- Family: Rubiaceae
- Genus: Hindsia; Benth. ex Lindl.

Species
- See text

= Hindsia =

Genus of plants

Hindsia is a genus of about 11 species of shrubs in the family Rubiaceae, native to tropical South America, mainly in Brazil. The species Hindsia longiflora and H. violacea were used to separate the genus from Rondeletia. The genus was named in honour of Richard Brinsley Hinds.

Species include:

- Hindsia arianeae Di Maio
- Hindsia cucullata Di Maio
- Hindsia glabra K.Schum.
- Hindsia ibitipocensis Di Maio
- Hindsia irwinii Steyerm.
- Hindsia longiflora (Cham.) Benth. ex Lindl.
- Hindsia phyllocalyx K.Schum.
- Hindsia ramosissima Gardner
- Hindsia republicana Di Maio
- Hindsia sessilifolia Di Maio
- Hindsia violacea Benth. ex Lindl.
