= Bradea =

Scientific classification
- Kingdom: Plantae
- Clade: Tracheophytes
- Clade: Angiosperms
- Clade: Eudicots
- Clade: Asterids
- Order: Gentianales
- Family: Rubiaceae
- Genus: Bradea; Standl.

Type species
- Bradea brasiliensis Standl.

Genus of plants

Bradea is a genus of flowering plants in the family Rubiaceae. It was first described by Paul Carpenter Standley in 1932 and is named after the German botanist Alexander Curt Brade. All 6 species are endemic to Brazil, hence the name of the type species.

== Species ==
- Bradea anomala Brade
- Bradea bicornuta Brade
- Bradea borrerioides J.A.Oliveira & Sobrado
- Bradea brasiliensis Standl.
- Bradea kuhlmanni Brade
- Bradea montana Brade
