= Jean Baptiste Christophore Fusée Aublet =

French pharmacist, botanist and botanical explorer

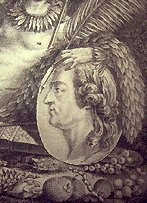
- Fusée Aublet (1720–1778)
- Born: 4 November 1720; Salon-de-Provence, France
- Died: 6 May 1778 (aged 57); Paris, France
- Scientific career
- Author abbrev. (botany): Aubl.

Jean Baptiste Christophore Fusée Aublet (November 4, 1720 – May 6, 1778) was a French pharmacist, botanist and one of the earliest botanical explorers in South America. He was one of the first botanists to study ethnobotany in the Neotropics.

Born in Salon-de-Provence, Aublet left home early and traveled to Grenada, then a French colony, where he became an apothecary's assistant and learned about medicinal plants. A year later he returned to France and continued his studies in natural history, chemistry, and pharmacology. One of his mentors was Bernard de Jussieu, a French naturalist who would later help him with plant identification.

He joined the French East India Company and in 1752 was sent to Mauritius (then known as l'Île de France) to establish a pharmacy and a botanical garden. He became involved in an intense rivalry with Pierre Poivre, a fellow botanist at the Mon Plaisir garden, and eventually left to establish a new garden at Le Réduit.

When Aublet returned to France in 1762, he was appointed to a position as the King's apothecary and botanist in French Guiana. He arrived at the colonial capital, Isle de Cayenne, in August 1762 and spent the next two years collecting plants and assembling a vast herbarium. Aublet also worked with the local people to record the traditional uses of the native plants, and often used their names for the plants as the basis for the scientific names he bestowed upon taxa. His outspoken opposition to slavery was unusual for someone in his position and earned him the resentment of the local colonists who complained about his "corrupt" nature. When poor health forced his return to France in 1764, he felt obliged to obtain a letter from the Procurator General, testifying to his good and honorable conduct.

After a brief stay in Haiti, Aublet continued on to Paris, arriving in 1765. With the help of Jussieu, his former mentor, he wrote descriptions of the plants he collected and prepared some 400 illustrations. In 1775 he published Histoire des plantes de la Guiane Françoise describing 576 genera and 1,241 species of neotropical plants, including more than 400 species that were new to science. At a time when only 20,000 plants had been described, this represented a significant addition to botanical knowledge. Aublet also included essays on economically important plants and wrote about the people of the colony; he is considered by some to be the "founding father" of ethnobotany in the Neotropics.

When Aublet died at Paris in 1778, he left part of his plant collection to Jean-Jacques Rousseau, though the latter possessed it for only two months before he too died. It was eventually acquired by the Muséum national d'Histoire naturelle in 1953. Aublet's herbarium, drawings, and notes were purchased by Joseph Banks and are now archived at the British Museum of Natural History.
