= Alexander Curt Brade =

German botanist (1881–1971)

Alexander Curt Brade (1881–1971) was a German botanist who specialized in the study of the orchids and ferns of Brazil and Costa Rica.

Born on 19 June 1881 at Forst (Lausitz), Brade studied architecture at Görlitz in Silesia, but became increasingly interested in botany. After working for several years in Germany as an architect and construction engineer, he accepted an invitation to join his brother Alfred, who lived in San Jose, Costa Rica, and owned a horticultural business in Europe. Arriving at Puerto Limon in January 1908, Brade embarked on plant hunting expeditions along the Atlantic coast. Over the next two and a half years, he collected about 500 plant species, however much of his collection was to be destroyed in the bombing of the Berlin-Dahlem Museum in World War II before it was classified.

Not wishing to return to Germany and its cold winters, Brade joined another relative in Brazil in 1910, where he again worked in construction, botanizing in his spare time. After an unsuccessful venture into farming, he accepted a post with the National Museum. Brade later moved to the Rio de Janeiro Botanical Garden, where he rose to Acting Superintendent in 1934, ultimately becoming Head of the Department of Systemic Botany. Retiring in 1952, Brade returned to São Paulo, where he built a home and dedicated himself to the classification of the ferns and Melastomataceae he had collected.

He wrote 86 papers published in various scientific journals, and in 1958 was awarded the Gold Medal of Merit 'D. João VI' on the 150th anniversary of the Botanical Garden of Rio de Janeiro.

== Eponymy ==
- Bradea Standl., a genus in the family Rubiaceae
- Zygostates bradei (Schltr.) Garay, an orchid species

== Selected publications ==
- Brade, A. C. "Herbarium Costaricense"
