= Kurt Krause =

German botanist (1883–1963)

Kurt Krause (April 20, 1883 in Potsdam – November 19, 1963 in Berlin) was a German botanist who wrote 33 articles and five books on the flora and vegetation of Turkey. Between 1933 and 1939, he was a professor of botany at the Ankara Agricultural Institute. Krause retired in 1950.

The standard author abbreviation K.Krause is used to indicate this person as the author when citing a botanical name.
