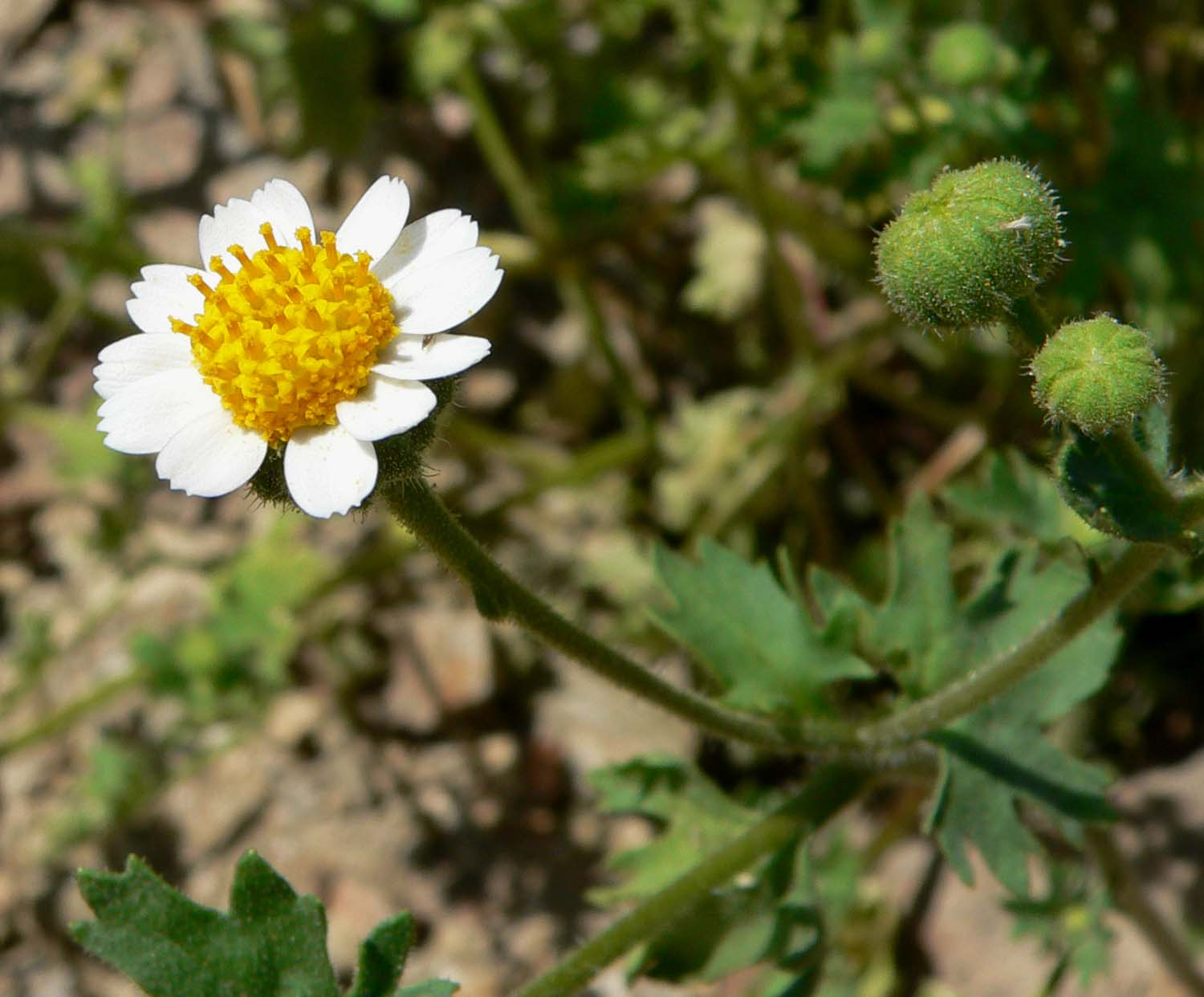
- Perityle emoryi

Scientific classification
- Kingdom: Plantae
- Clade: Tracheophytes
- Clade: Angiosperms
- Clade: Eudicots
- Clade: Asterids
- Order: Asterales
- Family: Asteraceae
- Subfamily: Asteroideae
- Tribe: Perityleae
- Subtribe: Peritylinae
- Genus: Perityle; Benth. (1844)

Synonyms
- Amauria Benth. (1844); Closia J.Rémy (1849); Lycapsus Phil. (1870)

= Perityle =

Genus of flowering plants

Perityle is a genus of flowering plants in the daisy family. They are known generally as rock daisies.

Perityle is a variable genus, with its members sharing few characteristics. They include small herbs to spreading shrubs and most bear yellow or white daisylike flower heads. The fruit is generally a flat seed with thickened margins which may or may not have a pappus or scales. Plants of this genus are native to North and South America.

A study including morphological and cytological analyses and a phylogenomic analysis of chloroplast and nuclear genomes was published in 2022, and concluded that Perityle as previously circumscribed was polyphyletic. The authors revived and/or expanded the genera Galinsogeopsis, Laphamia, and Nesothamnus to establish monophyletic clades. The small genus Amauria and the Desventuradas Islands endemic species Lycapsus tenuifolius were merged into Perityle, leaving it with 13 species.

== Species ==
13 species are currently accepted.

- Perityle aurea Rose
- Perityle brandegeeana Rose
- Perityle californica Benth.
- Perityle carterae (A.M.Powell) Lichter-Marck
- Perityle congesta (M.E.Jones) Shinners
- Perityle crassifolia Brandegee
- Perityle cuneata Brandegee
- Perityle emoryi Torr.
- Perityle rosei Greenm.
- Perityle rotundifolia (Benth.) Brandegee
- Perityle socorrosensis Rose
- Perityle tenuifolius (Phil.) Lichter-Marck
- Perityle trichodonta S.F.Blake

=== Formerly placed here ===
- Laphamia fosteri (A.M.Powell) Lichter-Marck (as Perityle fosteri A.M.Powell)
- Laphamia inyoensis Ferris (as Perityle inyoensis (Ferris) A.M.Powell)
- Laphamia lindheimeri A.Gray (as Perityle lindheimeri (A.Gray) Shinners)
- Laphamia saxicola Eastw. (as Perityle saxicola (Eastw.) Shinners)
- Nesothamnus incanus (A.Gray) Rydb. (as Perityle incana A.Gray)
