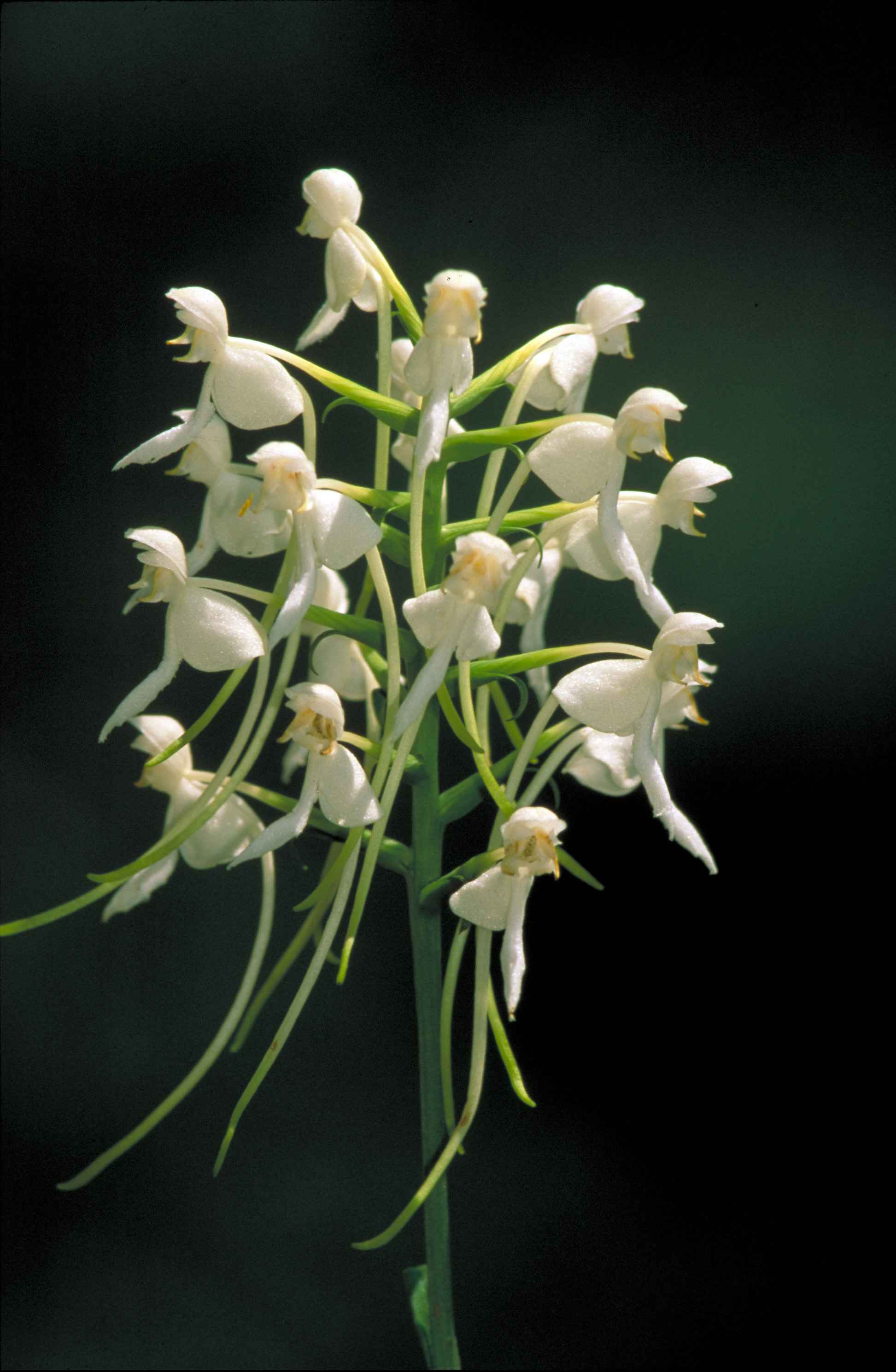

Conservation status
- Near Threatened (IUCN 3.1)

- Threatened (ESA)

Scientific classification
- Kingdom: Plantae
- Clade: Tracheophytes
- Clade: Angiosperms
- Clade: Monocots
- Order: Asparagales
- Family: Orchidaceae
- Subfamily: Orchidoideae
- Genus: Platanthera
- Species: P. integrilabia

Binomial name
- Platanthera integrilabia (Correll) Luer

= Platanthera integrilabia =

Species of orchid

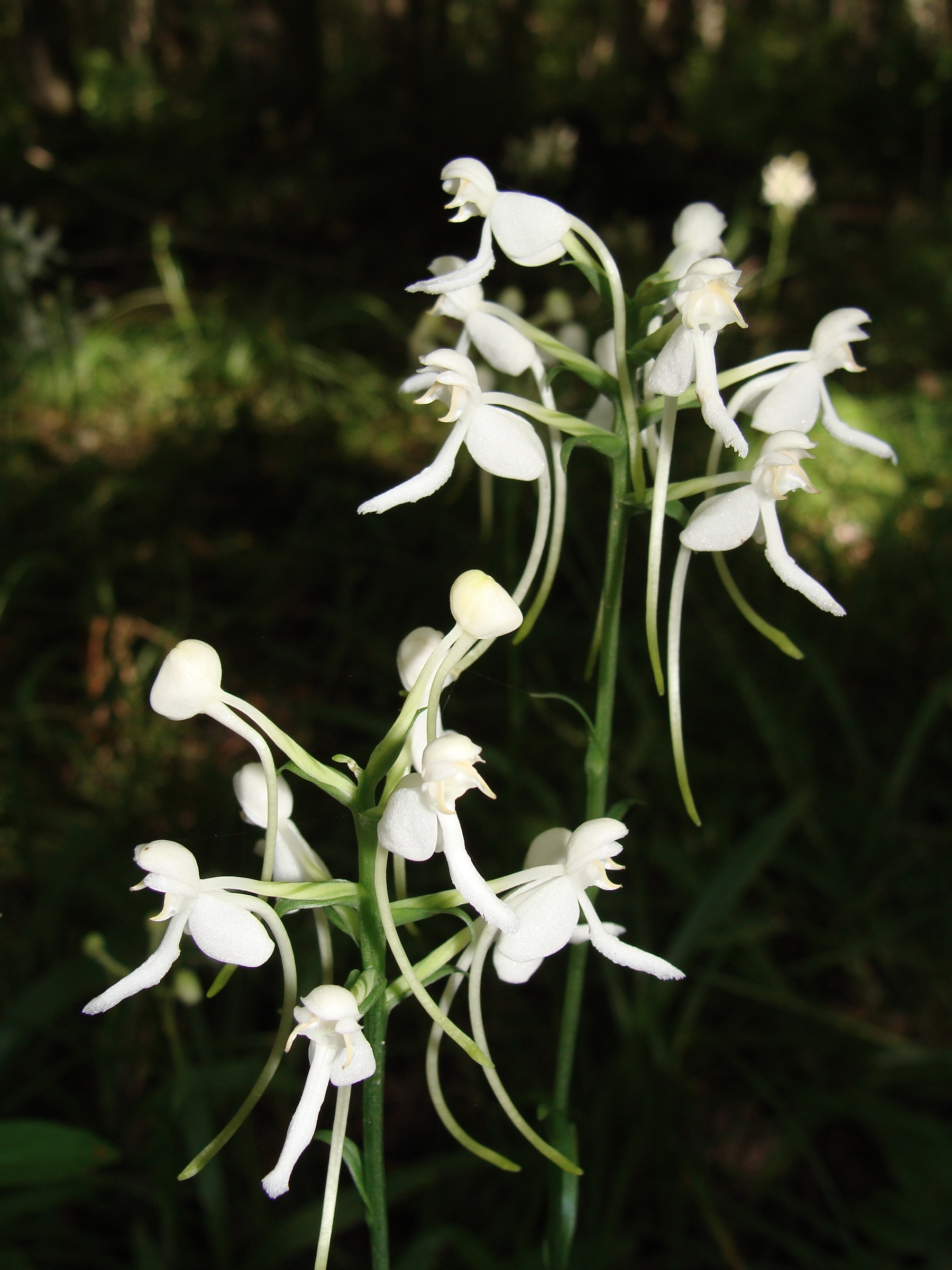
White fringeless orchid

Platanthera integrilabia, commonly called white fringeless orchid, is a species of flowering plant in the orchid family (Orchidaceae). It is native to seven states in the Southeastern United States; Kentucky, Mississippi, Tennessee, Alabama, Georgia, North Carolina, and South Carolina. However, the white fringeless orchid is only known from 52 populations that are primarily concentrated in Tennessee and Kentucky on the Cumberland Plateau. It is typically found in flat swampy habitats, especially near the head of streams and usually in partial open sunlight. The white fringeless orchid is also involved in a symbiotic relationship with mycorrhizal fungi that aids in seed germination and growth.

== Description ==
Platanthera integrilabia is a mycotrophic perennial containing up to 20 sweetly scented white flowers and reaching up to 2-feet tall. It has two leaves restricted to the base of the stem and conspicuous elongated nectar-containing spurs that come from the back of the flower and curve forward in front. The white fringeless orchid reproduces primarily through outcrossing, and is pollinated by butterflies such as the eastern tiger swallowtail and silver-spotted skippers. These butterflies have the ability to reach the nectar within the spurs with their lengthened tongues. The white fringeless orchid differs from other Platanthera species by its round labellum. It typically flowers from late July to early September, but can flower as early as June in the southern part of its range. The percentage of flowering individuals in a population for a given year is typically very low, with many individuals reproducing clonally through tubers.

== Threats ==
The white fringeless orchid is most threatened by human related activities, such as road construction, commercial and residential development, wetland draining, canopy closure, and the use of herbicides. Invasive nonnative plants, improper timber harvest techniques, poaching, deer browsing, changes to the natural water flow, destruction from feral hogs, and drought also are known threats that put this plant at risk of extinction. Due to these factors, Platanthara integrilabia has a low reproductive capacity and small population sizes.

Furthermore, the white fringeless orchid and its close relatives produce several thousand dust-like seeds each year that lack endosperm. These seeds are dependent on wind dispersal, and only around 3% of wind-dispersed seeds will germinate. Because of this, Platanthera integrilabia has to produce an extensive quantity of seeds to overcome high seedling and seed mortality. Due to their nutrient deficiency within the seed, the plant cannot grow on its own and therefore relies heavily on mycorrhizal fungi to provide necessary resources for growth after its germination. Recent studies have indicated that inbreeding depression and a lack of effective pollinators are also contributors to the low reproductive capacity of Platanthera integrilabia.

== Symbiotic relationship with fungi ==
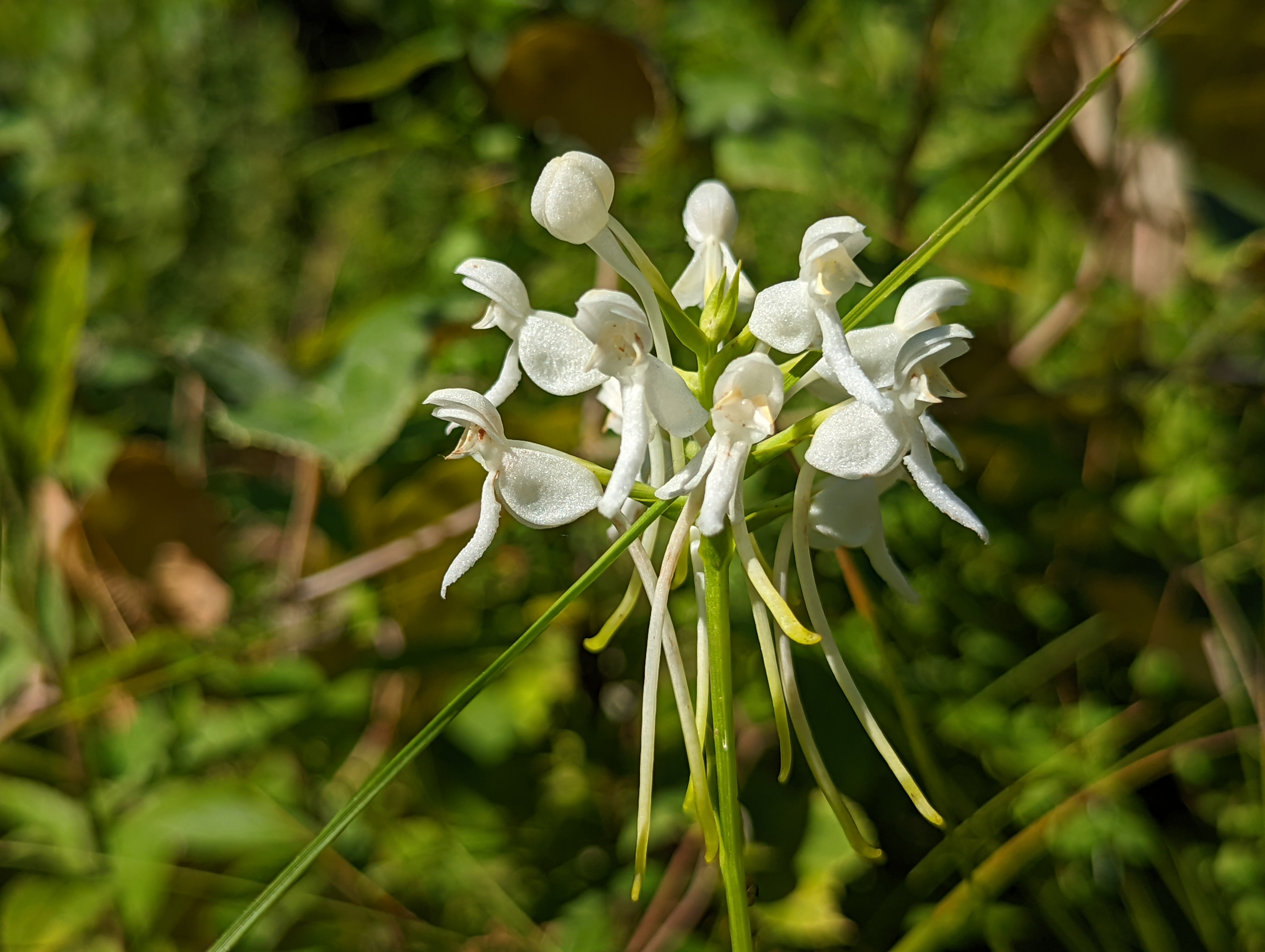
Flowering Platanthera integrilabia in Kentucky

The white fringeless orchid lives in a mycotrophic symbiotic relationship with the mycorrhizal fungus Epulorhiza inquilina that influences orchid seed germination. Mycorrhizal fungi infect a plant's root system in a mutually beneficial way, providing access to a large amount of water and nutrients (such as nitrogen, copper, phosphorus, and zinc) for sugars and carbon in return from the plant. There are thousands of different mycorrhizal fungi, and this relationship between a fungus and the roots of its host plant has existed for 400-500 million years. Mycorrhizal fungi are vital for the successful development of orchid populations, and therefore testing for the presence of fungi at restoration sites is essential. Mycorrhizal fungi can increase pathogen resistance and tolerance to drought, improve soil structure, and increase nutrient and water uptake.

== Conservation ==
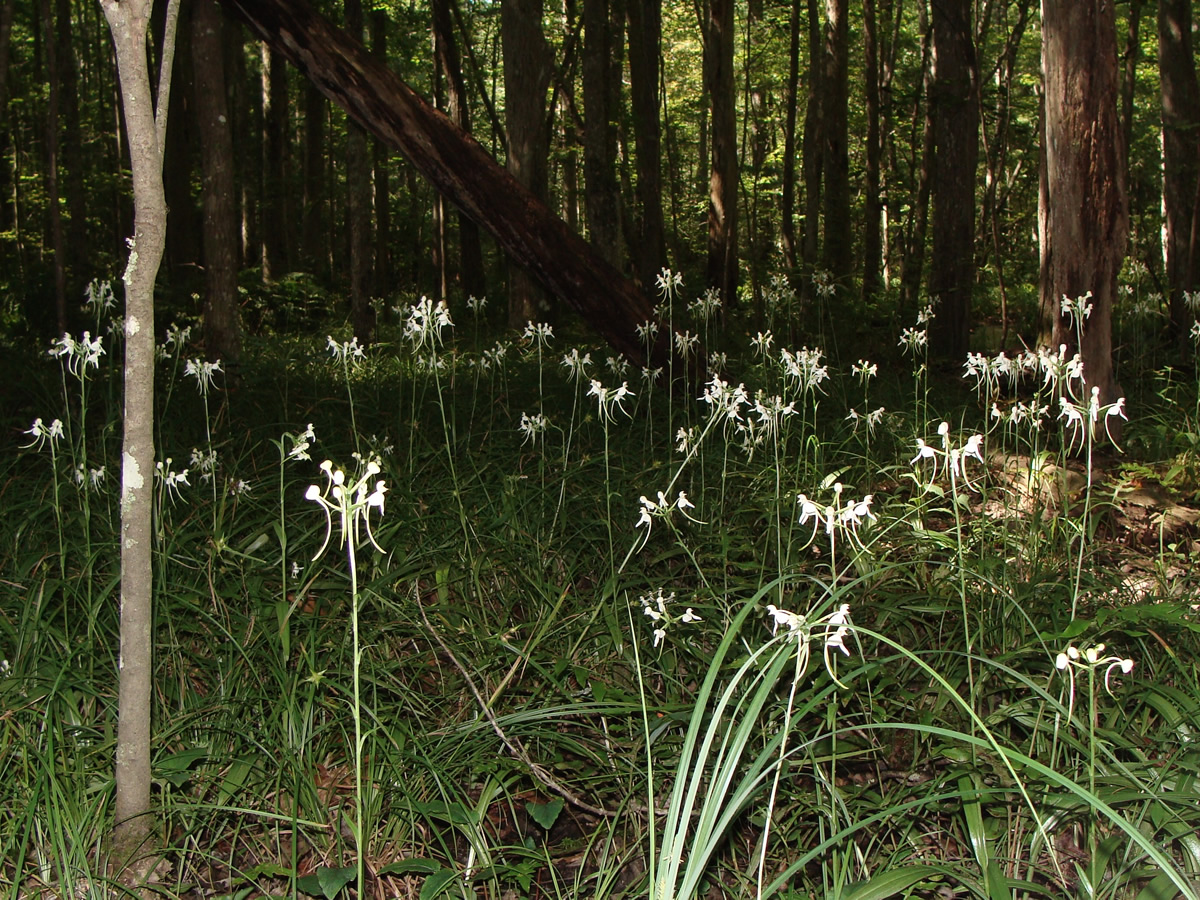
Natural habitat of Platanthera integrilabia

Platanthera integrilabia is a rare species throughout its range. There are roughly 50-60 known extant populations, most of which consist of less than 100 individuals (although some populations have up to 1,000). Populations have declined greatly due to fire suppression, which has created an unfavorably dense canopy throughout much of its range. In addition, wetland destruction in the form of draining for agriculture and the creation of farm ponds has eliminated much of its former bog and seep habitat.

In 2016, Platanthera integrilabia was listed as Threatened by the Endangered Species Act, after being a candidate for listing since 1980. This species has been seen as "highly vulnerable" to climate change, meaning a likely decrease in population size by 2050. Furthermore, drought may reduce germination and seed set while increasing mortality. Active management through timber harvest is necessary to prevent canopy closure but must be done in a careful manner to protect this species and the habitat from further damage. Monitoring these small populations and continuing conservation efforts across the southeastern United States is needed to improve understanding of reproduction, trends, and plant abundance. Previous research on terrestrial orchids has indicated that translocated tubers are more successful in field establishment than seeds. Studies have also shown that the white fringeless orchid corresponds with better performance and growth within higher soil moisture and shaded, humid climates.

There are conservation efforts in place. Currently, the Conservation Seed Bank at the Atlanta Botanical Garden contains more than 100 maternal lines of the white fringeless orchid that each contribute to over 10,000 seeds. These seeds were gathered from Desoto State Park in Alabama, Cherokee National Forest in Tennessee, Talladega National Forest in Alabama, and two privately owned populations in Georgia. The Atlanta Botanical Garden has also conducted research on orchid mycorrhizal fungi from the roots of white fringeless orchids, which can be used to improve seed germination methods and increase survival rates of this species reintroduction into native habitats throughout the southeastern United States.

Additionally, a small neighborhood in Pickens County, Georgia has worked to protect the white fringeless orchid. In 2012, North American Land Trust (NALT) Conservation Biologist Lee Echols discovered the existence of the white fringeless orchid on a routine monitoring trip to the Big Canoe Conservation Easement. After his discovery, a group was formed to restore and protect the bog in order to save the orchid population. This group consisted of Matt Richards (an orchid expert) from the Atlanta Botanical Gardens, Walter Bland (owner of Rock Spring Farm), the Georgia Department of Natural Resources, the Big Canoe Property Association, and the Meadows Committee. In 2015, this conglomerate put together a 750-foot fence around the bog to prevent deer and humans from running over or browsing the orchids. Since natural pollination had been unsuccessful, Matt Richards manually pollinated the species using a pencil. After pollination, Richards collected the seeds and brought them back to the Atlanta Botanical Garden where they are germinating and growing. Importantly, this large-scale conservation effort was successful. In 2017, the number of white fringeless orchids increased from 5 to over 30.
