= Rock daisy =

The common name rock daisy may be applied to plants in any of several genera in the family Asteraceae, including:

- Brachyscome
- Pachystegia
- Perityle
