= Acianthera angustisepala =

Scientific classification
- Kingdom: Plantae
- Clade: Tracheophytes
- Clade: Angiosperms
- Clade: Monocots
- Order: Asparagales
- Family: Orchidaceae
- Subfamily: Epidendroideae
- Genus: Acianthera
- Species: A. angustisepala

Binomial name
- Acianthera angustisepala (Ames & Correll) Pridgeon & M.W.Chase

Synonyms
- Acianthera javieri Archila; Pleurothallis angustisepala Ames & Correll; Pleurothallis javieri (Archila) Pfahl

Species of plant

Acianthera angustisepala is a species of epiphytic plant in the Orchidaceae family.

== Range and habitat ==
Acianthera angustisepala is native to southeastern Mexico (Chiapas), Belize, and Guatemala. It is an epiphyte found in forests at elevations of 800 to 1350 meters.

== Taxonomy ==
The species was first described Pleurothallis angustisepala in 1942. It was renamed Acianthera angustisepala by Alec Melton Pridgeon and Mark Wayne Chase in Lindleyana 16: 247 in 2001.
