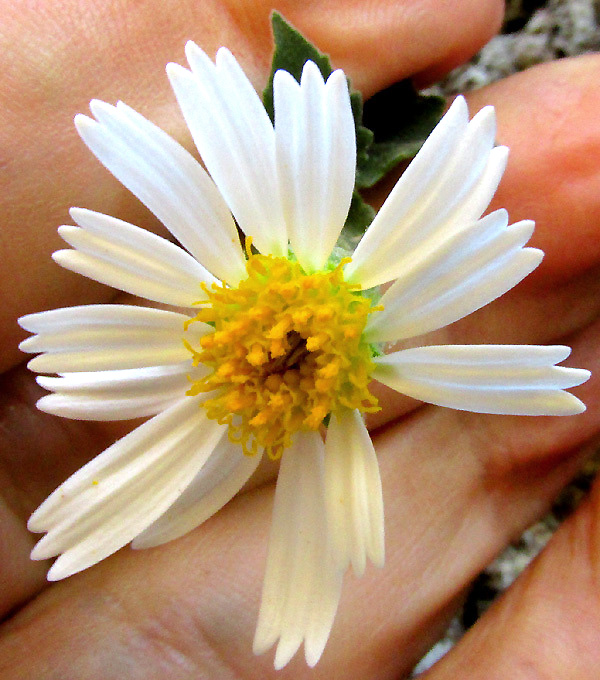

Scientific classification
- Kingdom: Plantae
- Clade: Tracheophytes
- Clade: Angiosperms
- Clade: Eudicots
- Clade: Asterids
- Order: Asterales
- Family: Asteraceae
- Genus: Eutetras
- Species: E. pringlei

Binomial name
- Eutetras pringlei Greenm.

= Eutetras pringlei =

Species of flowering plant

Eutetras pringlei is a species of flowering plant belonging to the family Asteraceae.

== Description ==
With its flowering head consisting of white ray florets surrounding an "eye" of yellow disk florets, Eutetras pringlei is similar to hundreds of other daisy-like members of the Aster Family. However, here is a list of features which, altogether, define the relatively small New World tribe to which Eutetras pringlei belongs, the "rock daisy" tribe, the Perityleae:

- Flowering heads consist of white, petal-like ray florets surrounding a cluster of yellow disk florets with cylindrical corollas.
- Plants produce more than one flowering head.
- Green, scale-like bracts forming a bowl-like involucre below the flowering heads are arranged in a single series beside one another and are not fused where their margins meet.
- One-seeded, cypsela-type fruits are topped with two (sometimes 1-4) erect bristles along with, usually but not always, a low "crown" of fused scales.
- No papery, scale-like bracts (paleae) separate cypselae from one another.
- Stalks, or peduncles, holding the flower heads don't "bleed" white latex when injured.
- The cypselae are black.

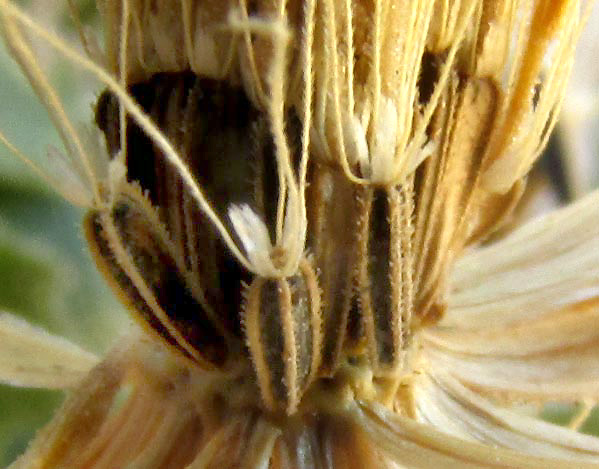
Eutetras pringlei cypselae with pappuses

Within the rock daisy tribe, the Perityleae, the genus Eutetras mainly is distinguished from other genera by its one-seeded cypselae-type fruits, and the pappuses atop them, a close look seen at the left. Note that the cypselae have four sides with hairless faces, while the very prominent, somewhat ribbed margins are hairy. The pappuses' bristles are hairy, and the crown of scales, though varying among individual plans, in this case are conspicuous and their tops are raggedly incised, or cut. This combination of features is very rare and distinctive within the Aster Family.

The genus Eutetras currently comprises only two species. In the formal description of the new species Eutetras pringlei, the author J.M. Greenman in 1905 writes that the species is "... readily distinguished from E. Palmeri by being larger throughout, and of a less caespitose habit." Cespitose plants are those growing in dense, low tufts or clumps. Greenman frames the plants' larger size in terms of the species' stems attaining 30 cm (12 in) or more in length, and with leaves up to 4.5 cm (1.8 in) long and 4 cm (1.6 in) broad. Cypselae are 3.5 mm (0.14 in) long.

== Distribution ==
Eutetras pringlei is endemic to a small region in the central Mexican highlands, in portions of the states of Guanajuato, Hidalgo, Querétaro, México, San Luis Potosí and Veracruz.

== Habitat ==
The specie is said to inhabit basaltic cliffs.

== Taxonomy ==
Within the family Asteraceae, Eutetras pringlei belongs to the subfamily Asteroideae, the tribe Perityleae, and the subtribe Peritylinae. Within the genus Eutetras it is one of two species.

Phylogenetically, the two Eutetras species form a clade which is sister to the rest of the tribe Perityleae, indicating a relatively early appearance of the genus. One feature of this evolution is that Eutetras has a base chromosome number of x=18, while by far most genera in the tribe display fewer or more than 18.

== Etymology ==
In the genus name Eutetras the Eu is a combining form occurring chiefly in Greek words meaning "good, well". In taxonomic names, often it is used in the sense of "true, genuine". The -tetras is New Latin from the Greek tettares meaning "four". Thus with Eutetras, something is "truly four". Apparently this refers to the prominently four-angled, four-sided, cypsela-type fruits produced by species in the genus, a feature which much impressed the genus's author.

The species name pringlei honors C.G. Pringle, whose collection #8813, taken near Acámbaro, Guanajuato, Mexico on October 6, 1904, served as the type specimen when J.M. Greenman formally described the species in 1907.

== Gallery ==
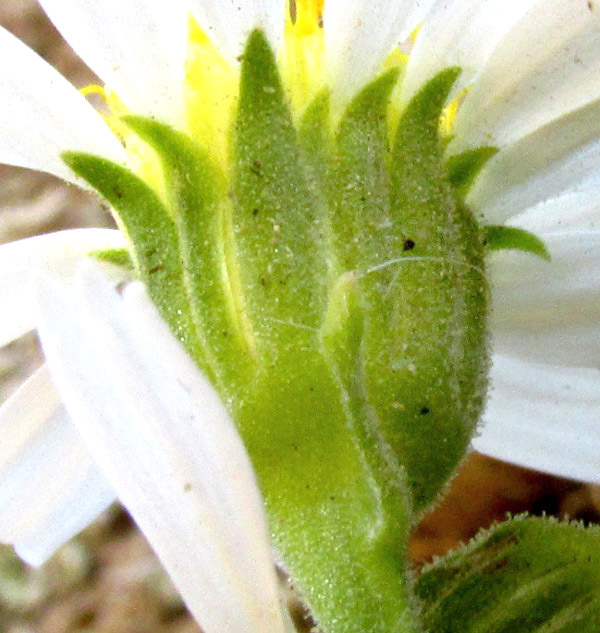
Eutetras pringlei, one series of involucral bracts below the flowering head

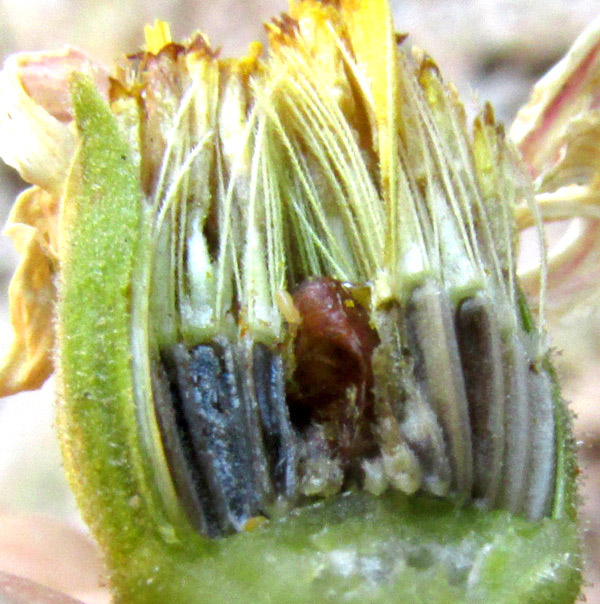
Eutetras pringlei, dissected head showing black cypselae with pappuses of bristles and low crowns

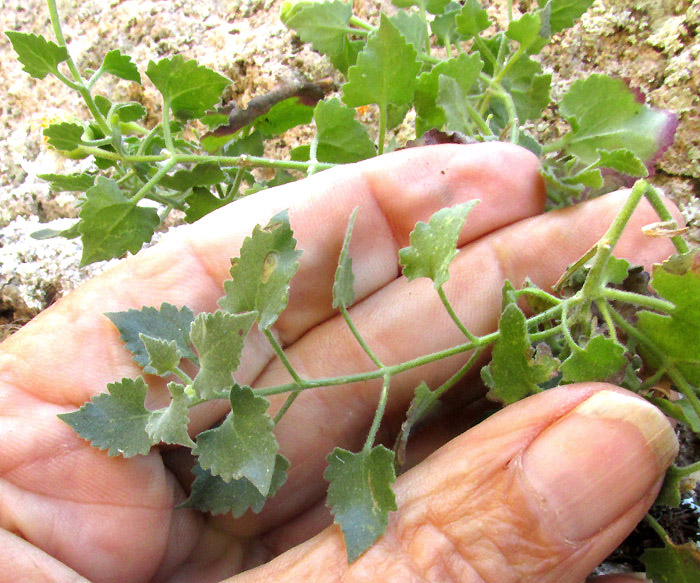
Eutetras pringlei, triangular leaves with long petioles

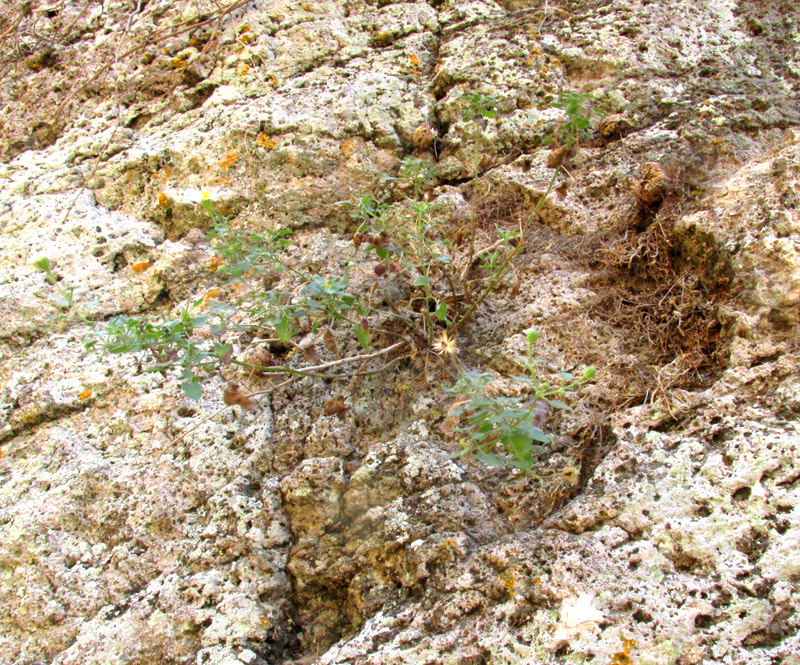
Eutetras pringlei, in habitat on near-vertical wall of volcanic rock
