= Donovan Stewart Correll =

American botanist (1908-1983)

Donovan "Don" Stewart Correll (13 April 1908, Wilson, North Carolina – 28 March 1983, Miami, Florida) was an American botanist, plant collector, and plant taxonomist, specializing in orchids.

== Biography ==
Correll grew up in North Carolina. For two years, before entering college, he took voice lessons and sang solos in church and on radio. He also spent a year doing various jobs in Florida. At Duke University, he graduated with A.B. in 1934, A.M. in 1936, and Ph.D. in 1939. Some of his doctoral work was done at Harvard University, where he worked under the orchidologist Oakes Ames, who introduced him to economic botany. At Harvard, Correll was financially assisted by the Anna C. Ames Memorial Scholarship. In 1937 he married Helen Elizabeth Butts (1907–2000). She received her Ph.D. in zoology from Duke University in 1934. She worked extensively on botany with her husband and became an expert on grasses and sedges.

He was from 1939 to 1943 a research associate at the Harvard University Botanical Museum. In 1943 he also worked as a botanist for the United States Department of Agriculture (USDA) on the Alaska Highway Botanical-Geological Survey, which was connected with the Alaska Highway project. From 1944 to 1946 he was a U.S. Navy gunnery officer. From 1946 to 1947 he was a Guggenheim Fellow at Harvard University.

From 1947 to 1956, Correll worked for the USDA. There he was involved with, or led, projects involving explorations for plants that might be useful to U.S. farmers or pharmaceutical companies. His book Native Orchids of North America, North of Mexico was published in 1950. Together with Oakes Ames, he published Orchids of Guatemala in two volumes in 1952 and 1953. In 1956 Correll resigned from the USDA and moved with his family to Texas.

In 1956 Correll became Head of the Botanical Laboratory, Texas Research Foundation, in Renner, Texas, where he continued his explorations for wild species of potato in Mexico, Peru, Colombia, Bolivia, and Ecuador. Other plants also caught his attention, and on one Mexican exploration in Sonora a tiny member of the sunflower family caught his eye; it was of a new genus and subsequently named Correllia montana A.M.Powell. His primary project in Texas, however, was the preparation of a complete work of the native and introduced plants of the state, and in 1970 he saw published the Manual of the Vascular Plants of Texas. He also helped to create the Big Thicket National Park and preserve nearly 100,000 acres of pristine wilderness.

For the academic year 1959–1960 he was a Guggenheim Fellow.

Among his collaborators in Texas were Irving William Knobloch and Marshall C. Johnston. During his career, Correll was the author or co-author of 11 books and more than 115 papers.

From 1971 to 1973 Correll worked as Program Director for Systematic Biology at the National Science Foundation. Then Correll moved to the Fairchild Tropical Botanic Garden in Miami, where he and his wife Helen B. Correll, with their assistant Priscilla Fawcett, researched the flora of the Bahamas. The work Flora of the Bahama Archipelago, Including the Turks and Caicos Islands , which was created on the basis of this work, was published in 1982.

Correll was a member of The Explorers Club and numerous botanical associations. Upon his death in 1983, he was survived by his widow Helen Butts Correll, two sons, and two daughters.

== Awards and honors ==
The Native Plant Society of Texas has been giving the Donovan Stewart Correll Memorial Award annually since 1988 for scientific work in the field of flora in the US state of Texas.

== Eponyms ==
- Correllia A.M.Powell (Asteraceae; synonym for the genus Perityle)
- Correlliana D'Arcy (Primulaceae)

== Selected publications ==
- Brown, Claire A. & Correll, Donovan Stewart: Ferns and fern allies of Louisiana. Louisiana State University Press. 1942
- Correll, Donovan Stewart: Collecting wild potatoes in Mexico. Circular / USDA, 1948
- Correll, Donovan Stewart: Native Orchids of North America, North of Mexico. Chronica Botanica Company, 1950
- Correll, Donovan Stewart: Section Tuberarium of the genus Solanum of North America and Central America (Agriculture monograph). USDA, 1952
- Ames, Oakes & Correll, Donovan Stewart: Orchids of Guatemala. 2 Vol. Chicago Natural History Museum. 1952-53. Fieldiana: Botany Vol 26, Nos. 1&2
- Correll, Donovan Stewart: Vanilla: Its botany, history, cultivation and economic import. Soc. for Economic Botany. 1953 doi:10.1007/BF02930810
- Correll, Donovan Stewart: Ferns & Fern Allies of Texas. Texas Research Foundation, 1956
- Correll, Donovan Stewart: Flora of Peru (Botanical series). Field Museum of Natural History 1967
- Correll, Donovan Stewart & Johnston, Marshall Conring: Manual of the Vascular Plants of Texas. 1970
- Correll, Donovan Stewart & Correll, Helen B.: Aquatic & Wetland Plants of Southwestern United States. Stanford University Press 1975
- Correll, Donovan Stewart: Native Orchids of North America North of Mexico. Univ Microfilms Intl. 1978, ISBN 0-8047-0999-8
- Correll, Donovan Stewart: Alaska Highway Adventure. 1981
- Correll, Donovan Stewart: Potato & Its Wild Relatives: Section Tuberarium of the Genus Solanum. Lubrecht & Cramer Ltd, 1982, ISBN 0-934454-93-0
- Correll, Donovan Stewart: Notes from a singing plant explorer. 1983
- Ames, Oakes & Correll, Donovan Stewart: Orchids of Guatemala and Belize. Courier Dover Publications, 1985
