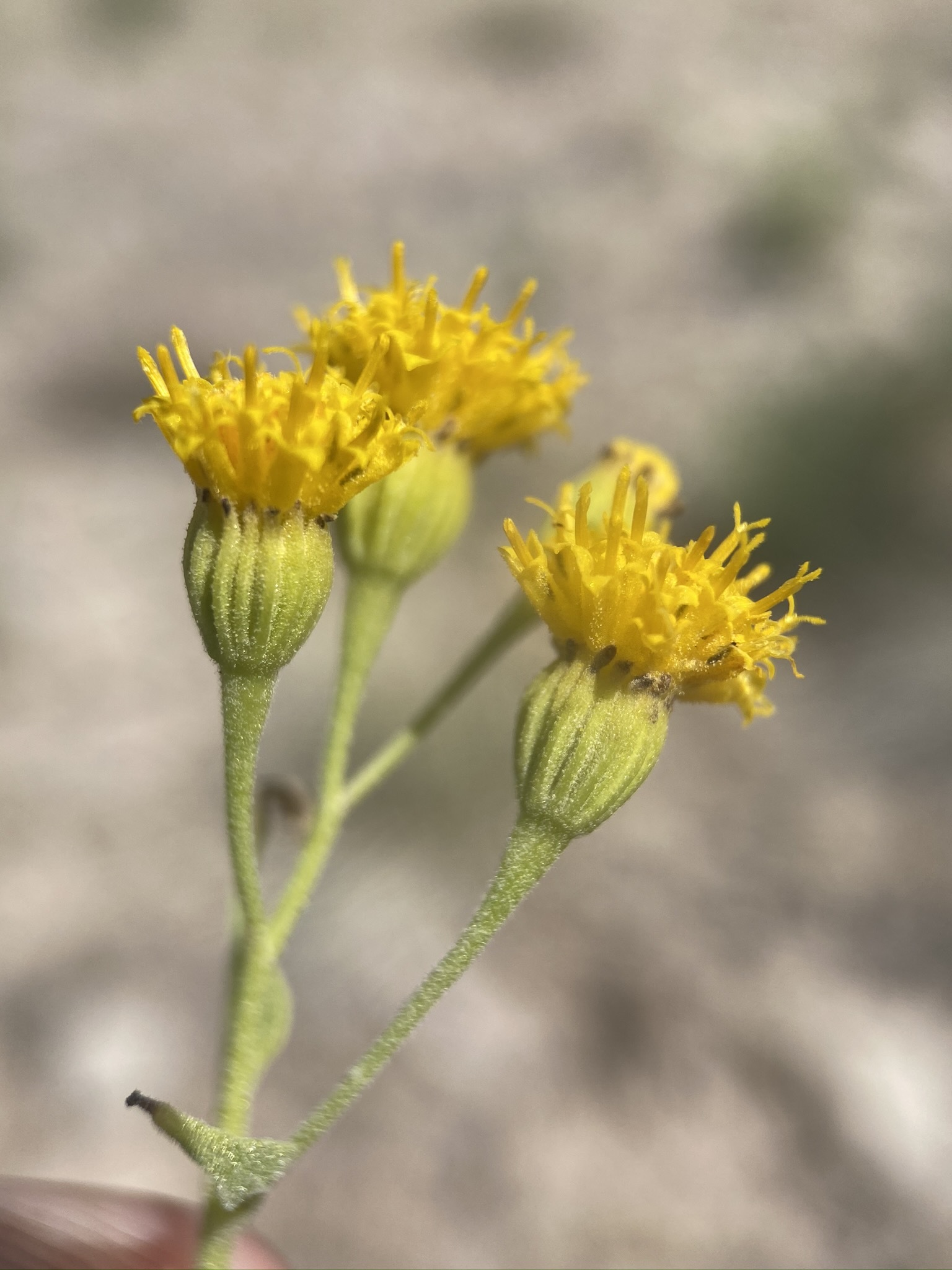
- Pericome caudata (mountain tail-leaf)

Scientific classification
- Kingdom: Plantae
- Clade: Tracheophytes
- Clade: Angiosperms
- Clade: Eudicots
- Clade: Asterids
- Order: Asterales
- Family: Asteraceae
- Subfamily: Asteroideae
- Tribe: Perityleae
- Subtribe: Peritylinae
- Genus: Pericome; A.Gray

Type species
- Pericome caudata A. Gray

Species
- 2, see text

= Pericome =

Genus of flowering plants

Pericome is a small genus of flowering plants in the daisy family. There are two species. Pericome caudata is native to the southwestern United States and northern Mexico, where it is relatively common. The second species, Pericome macrocephala, is known only from Durango in Mexico at its type locality.

These are branching perennial herbs or small shrubs often exceeding one meter tall. They bear clusters of flower heads with golden disc florets.
