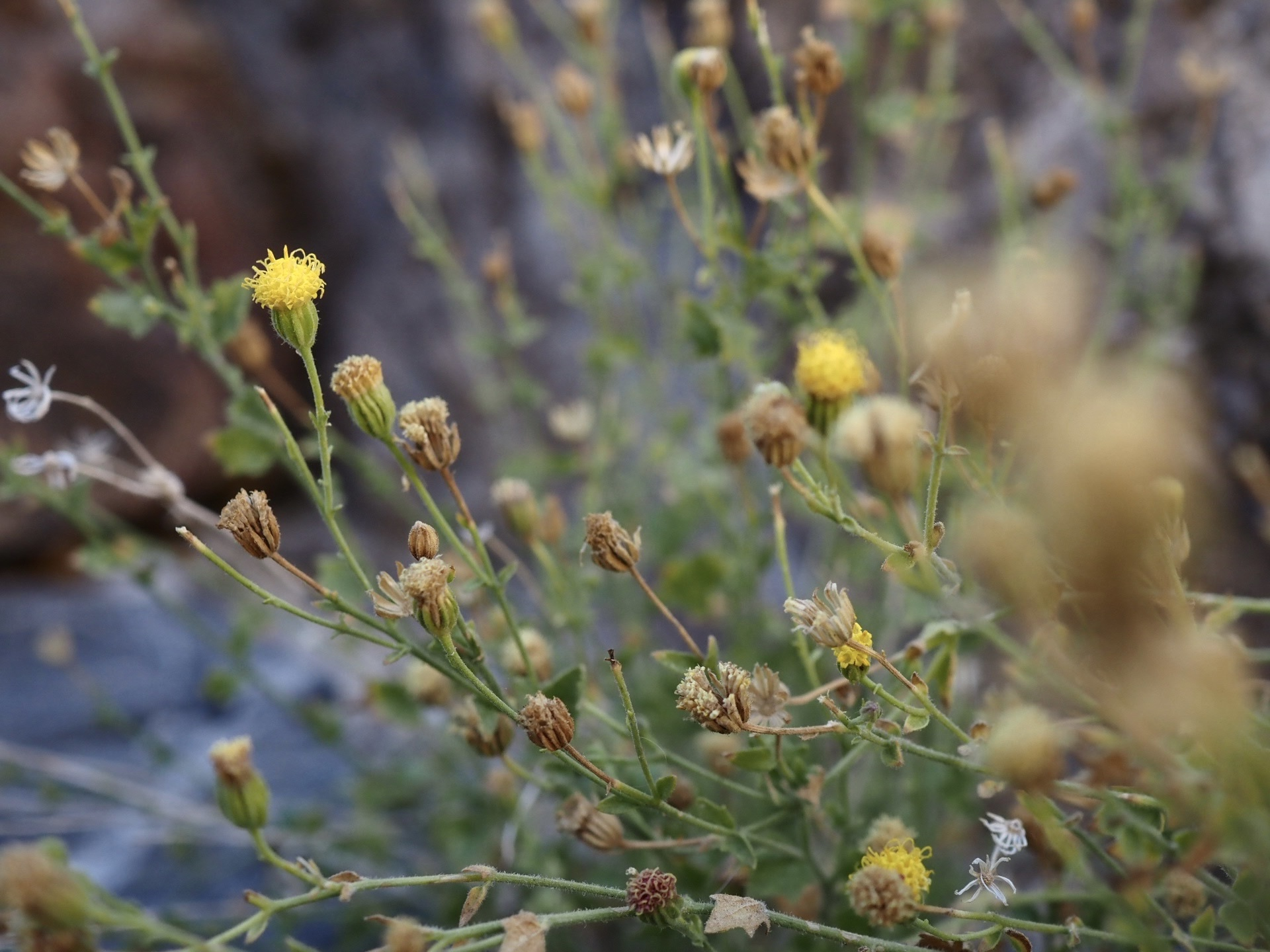

Scientific classification
- Kingdom: Plantae
- Clade: Embryophytes
- Clade: Tracheophytes
- Clade: Spermatophytes
- Clade: Angiosperms
- Clade: Eudicots
- Clade: Asterids
- Order: Asterales
- Family: Asteraceae
- Genus: Laphamia
- Species: L. inyoensis

Binomial name
- Laphamia inyoensis Ferris

Synonyms
- Perityle inyoensis (Ferris) A.M.Powell

= Laphamia inyoensis =

Plant species in the sunflower family

Laphamia inyoensis (synonym Perityle inyoensis), known by the common names Inyo rockdaisy and Inyo laphamia, is a rare species of flowering plant in the aster family.

It is endemic to Inyo County in eastern California.

It is known from just 10 populations in the southern Inyo Mountains, at elevations of 1,800–2,710 metres (5,910–8,890 ft). Its habitat is dry, rocky mountain slopes, often in limestone.

== Description ==
Laphamia inyoensis is a subshrub made up of a cluster of several hairy slender stems up to about 25 centimeters long. The hairy, glandular leaves are one or two centimeters long, oval to triangular, pointed, and toothed on the edges. They may be arranged oppositely or alternately on the stems.

The inflorescence bears one to three flower heads each under a centimeter wide. The head has yellow disc florets and no ray florets. The fruit is a fuzzy achene about 3 millimeters long.

Conservation

It is a California Native Plant Society listed Endangered species, and is threatened by proposed mining.

== Taxonomy ==
Laphamia inyoensis was named and scientifically described by Roxana Stinchfield Ferris in 1958. It is part of the genus Laphamia which is classified in the Asteraceae family. Albert Michael Powell proposed moving the species to Perityle in 1968, but this has not become accepted by other botanists. It has no varieties.
