= Galeana (plant) =

Scientific classification
- Kingdom: Plantae
- Clade: Tracheophytes
- Clade: Angiosperms
- Clade: Eudicots
- Clade: Asterids
- Order: Asterales
- Family: Asteraceae
- Subfamily: Asteroideae
- Tribe: Perityleae
- Subtribe: Galeaninae
- Genus: Galeana; La Llave

Type species
- Galeana hastata La Llave

Genus of flowering plants

Galeana is a genus of Mesoamerican flowering plants in the daisy family.

Species

- Galeana hastata La Llave - Veracruz
- Galeana pratensis (Kunth) Rydb. - Mexico + Central America from Nayarit to Costa Rica
