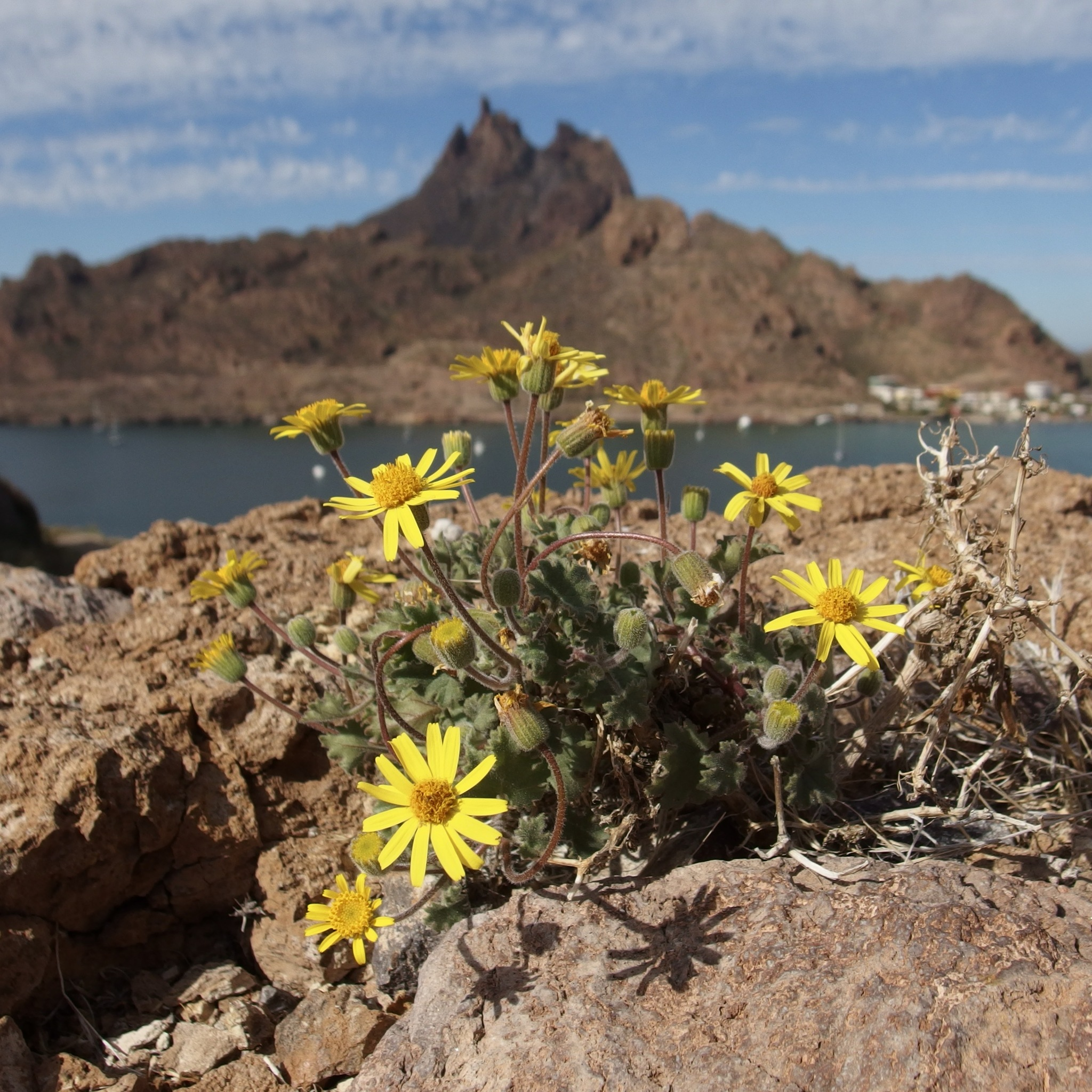
- Laphamia sanchezii

Scientific classification
- Kingdom: Plantae
- Clade: Tracheophytes
- Clade: Angiosperms
- Clade: Eudicots
- Clade: Asterids
- Order: Asterales
- Family: Asteraceae
- Subfamily: Asteroideae
- Tribe: Perityleae
- Genus: Laphamia; A.Gray (1852)

Species
- 43; see text

Synonyms
- Leptopharynx Rydb. (1914); Monothrix Torr. (1852); Pappothrix (A.Gray) Rydb. (1914)

= Laphamia =

Genus of flowering plants

Laphamia is a genus of flowering plants in the sunflower family, Asteraceae. It includes 43 species native to the southwestern and south-central United States and northern and western Mexico.

== Species ==
43 species are accepted.

- Laphamia aglossa (A.Gray) Benth. & Hook.f. ex Hemsl.
- Laphamia ajoensis (Todsen) Lichter-Marck
- Laphamia ambrosiifolia (Greene ex A.M.Powell & Yarb.) Lichter-Marck
- Laphamia angustifolia A.Gray
- Laphamia batopilensis (A.M.Powell) Lichter-Marck
- Laphamia bisetosa Torr.
- Laphamia carmenensis (A.M.Powell) Lichter-Marck
- Laphamia castillonii (I.M.Johnst.) Everly
- Laphamia cernua Greene
- Laphamia cinerea A.Gray
- Laphamia coahuilensis (A.M.Powell) Lichter-Marck
- Laphamia cochisensis W.E.Niles
- Laphamia cordifolia (Rydb.) Lichter-Marck
- Laphamia dissecta Torr.
- Laphamia fosteri (A.M.Powell) Lichter-Marck
- Laphamia gentryi (A.M.Powell) Lichter-Marck
- Laphamia gilensis M.E.Jones
- Laphamia gracilis M.E.Jones
- Laphamia grandifolia (Brandegee) Everly
- Laphamia huecoensis (A.M.Powell) Lichter-Marck
- Laphamia intricata Brandegee
- Laphamia inyoensis Ferris
- Laphamia lemmonii A.Gray
- Laphamia leptoglossa (Harv. & A.Gray) Lichter-Marck
- Laphamia lindheimeri A.Gray
- Laphamia lloydii (B.L.Rob. & Fernald) Lichter-Marck
- Laphamia lobata (Rydb.) Lichter-Marck
- Laphamia megalocephala S.Watson
- Laphamia palmeri A.Gray
- Laphamia parryi (A.Gray) Benth. & Hook.f. ex Hemsl.
- Laphamia quinqueflora Steyerm.
- Laphamia reinana (B.L.Turner) Lichter-Marck
- Laphamia rupestris A.Gray
- Laphamia sanchezii Lichter-Marck
- Laphamia saxicola Eastw.
- Laphamia specicola (S.L.Welsh & Neese) Lichter-Marck
- Laphamia stansburyi A.Gray
- Laphamia staurophylla Barneby
- Laphamia vandevenderi (B.L.Turner) Lichter-Marck
- Laphamia vaseyi (J.M.Coult.) Lichter-Marck
- Laphamia villosa S.F.Blake
- Laphamia vitreomontana (Warnock) Lichter-Marck
- Laphamia warnockii (A.M.Powell) Lichter-Marck
