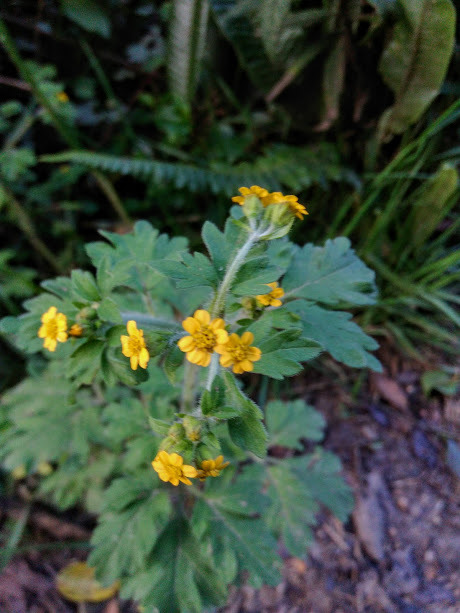
- Villanova oppositifolia

Scientific classification
- Kingdom: Plantae
- Clade: Tracheophytes
- Clade: Angiosperms
- Clade: Eudicots
- Clade: Asterids
- Order: Asterales
- Family: Asteraceae
- Tribe: Perityleae
- Subtribe: Galeaninae
- Genus: Villanova; Lag. 1816 conserved name, not Ortega 1797 (syn of Parthenium in Asteraceae) nor Pourr. ex Cutanda 1861 (syn of Flueggea in Euphorbiaceae)

Type species
- Villanova alternifolia Lag.

Synonyms
- Vasquezia Phil.; Chlamysperma Less.

= Villanova (plant) =

Genus of flowering plants

Villanova is a genus of Latin American plants in the sunflower family.

Species

- Villanova achilleoides (Less.) Less. - Mexico (Morelos, Puebla)
- Villanova oppositifolia Lag. - Bolivia, Chile (Antofagasta)
- Villanova robusta Phil. - Chile (Tarapacá)
- Villanova titicacensis (Meyen & Walp.) Walp. - Bolivia, Ecuador
