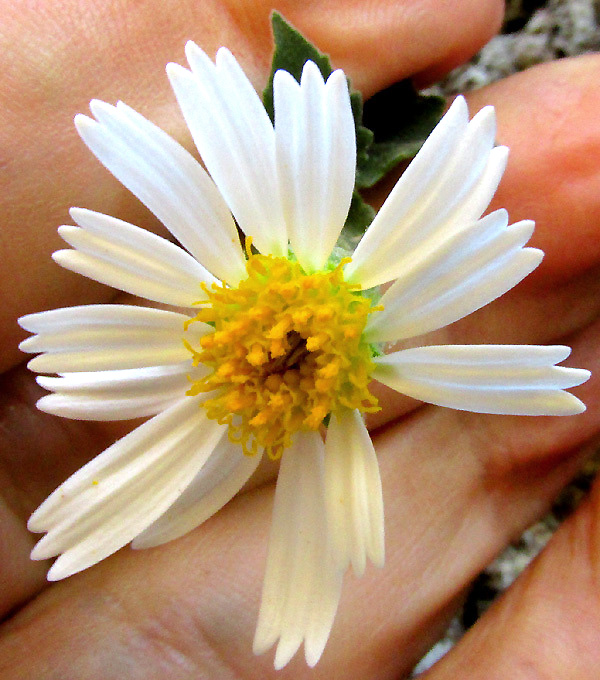
- Eutetras pringlei

Scientific classification
- Kingdom: Plantae
- Clade: Tracheophytes
- Clade: Angiosperms
- Clade: Eudicots
- Clade: Asterids
- Order: Asterales
- Family: Asteraceae
- Subfamily: Asteroideae
- Tribe: Perityleae
- Subtribe: Peritylinae
- Genus: Eutetras; A.Gray

Type species
- Eutetras palmeri A.Gray

= Eutetras =

Genus of flowering plants

Eutetras is a genus of Mexican flowering plants in the daisy family.

Species

- Eutetras palmeri A.Gray- Zacatecas, Aguascalientes
- Eutetras pringlei Greenm. - Guanajuato, Hidalgo
