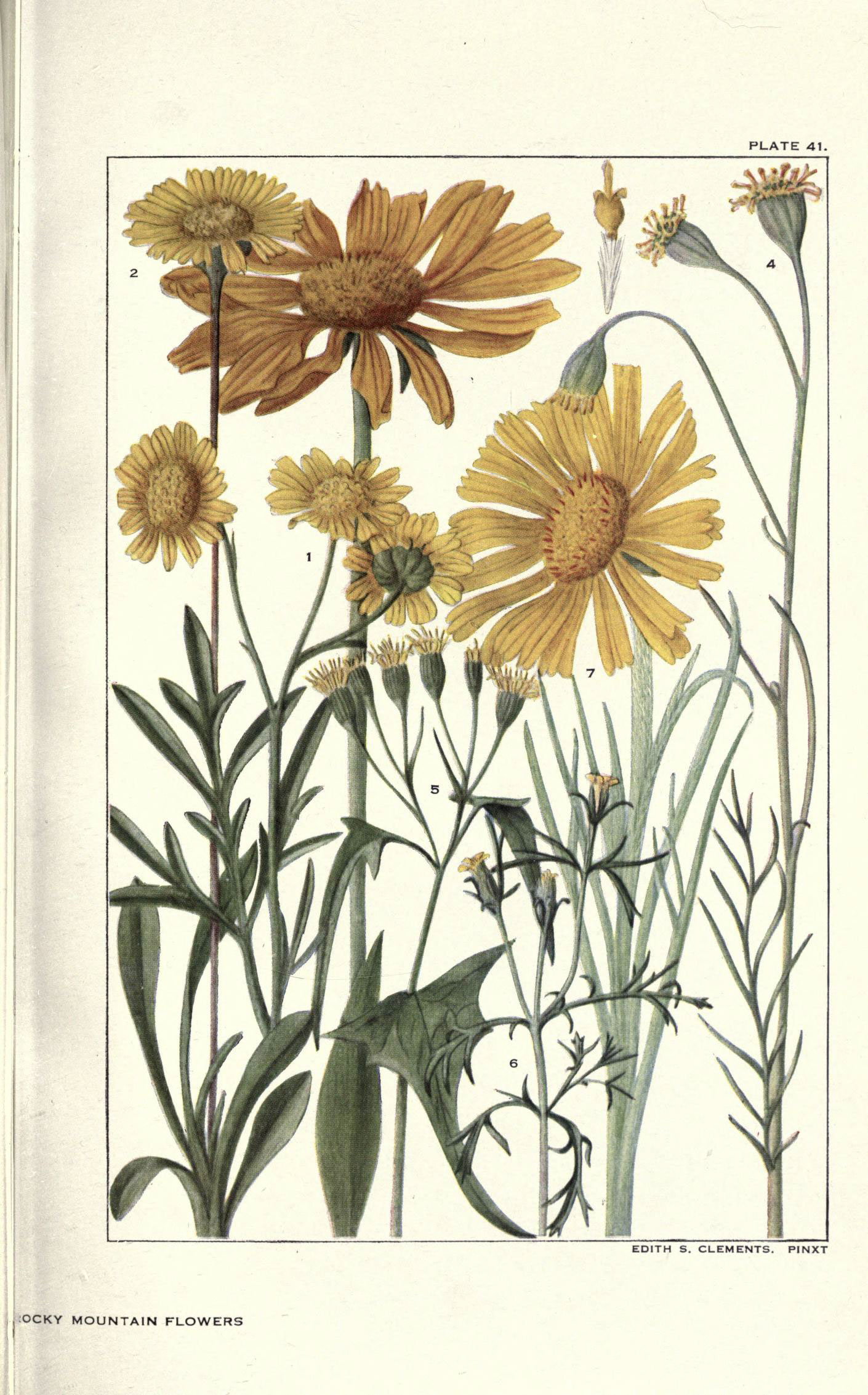
- Fig. nº 5

Conservation status
- Secure (NatureServe)

Scientific classification
- Kingdom: Plantae
- Clade: Tracheophytes
- Clade: Angiosperms
- Clade: Eudicots
- Clade: Asterids
- Order: Asterales
- Family: Asteraceae
- Genus: Pericome
- Species: P. caudata

Binomial name
- Pericome caudata A.Gray

= Pericome caudata =

Species of flowering plant

Pericome caudata is a North American species of flowering plant in the aster family known by the common name mountain tail-leaf.

== Description ==
It is a large, branching, leafy perennial herb or subshrub approaching 2 metres (6 1/2 ft) in maximum height. It is glandular, resinous, sparsely hairy, and aromatic. The leaves are somewhat triangular, sometimes with a few large teeth or sharp lobes, the blade measuring up to 12 centimetres (4 3/4 in) long and borne on a petiole. The leaf size and shape is variable across the species' range.

The inflorescence is a cluster of many flower heads each under a centimeter wide and filled with golden yellow disc florets.

== Distribution and habitat ==
It is native to the southwestern United States as far east as Colorado, Oklahoma, and Texas, as well as northern Mexico, where it grows in rocky habitat, often in hills and mountains, and sometimes in disturbed areas.

== Uses ==
The Navajo have used this plant for a variety of medicinal and ceremonial purposes.
