= Laphamia fosteri =

Conservation status
- Critically Imperiled (NatureServe)

Scientific classification
- Kingdom: Plantae
- Clade: Tracheophytes
- Clade: Angiosperms
- Clade: Eudicots
- Clade: Asterids
- Order: Asterales
- Family: Asteraceae
- Genus: Laphamia
- Species: L. fosteri

Binomial name
- Laphamia fosteri (A.M.Powell) Lichter-Marck (2022)
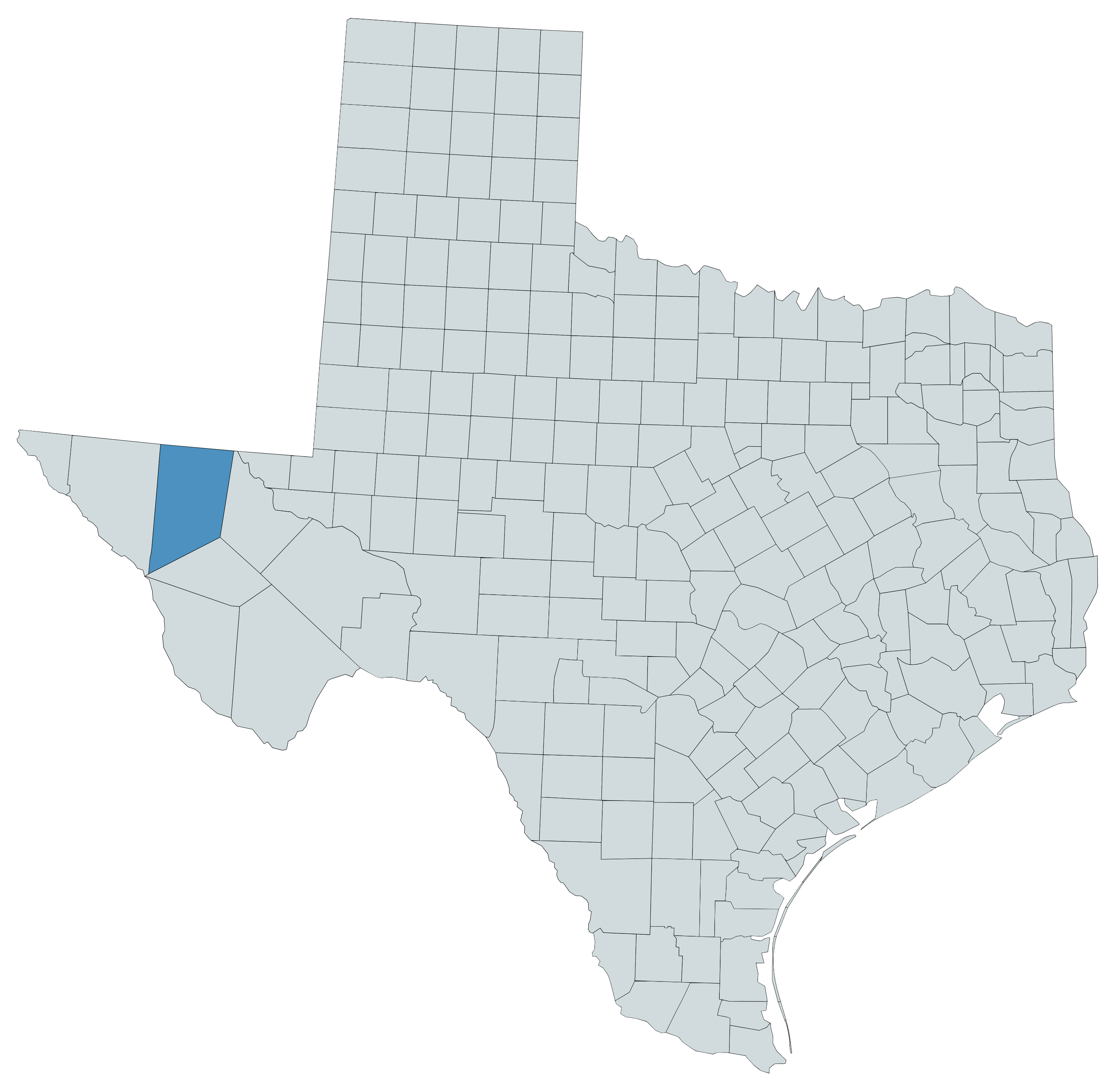
- Range of Laphamia fosteri in Texas

Synonyms
- Perityle fosteri A.M.Powell (1983)

Species of flowering plant

Laphamia fosteri is an endangered species of flowering plant endemic to Culberson County, Texas. It is found along limestone canyons in the Apache Mountains, an offshoot of the Guadalupe Mountains.
