= Laphamia saxicola =

Scientific classification
- Kingdom: Plantae
- Clade: Tracheophytes
- Clade: Angiosperms
- Clade: Eudicots
- Clade: Asterids
- Order: Asterales
- Family: Asteraceae
- Genus: Laphamia
- Species: L. saxicola

Binomial name
- Laphamia saxicola Eastw. (1931)

Synonyms
- Perityle saxicola (Eastw.) Shinners (1959)

Species of flowering plant

Laphamia saxicola is a rare species of flowering plant in the aster family known by the common names Roosevelt Dam rockdaisy and Fish Creek rockdaisy. It is endemic to Arizona in the United States, where it occurs in Tonto National Monument near the Roosevelt Dam.

This perennial herb or subshrub grows 20 to 40 centimeters tall. The narrow-lobed leaf blades are borne on petioles up to 3 centimeters long. The flower heads contain several yellow ray florets each about half a centimeter long and many yellow disc florets in the middle.

The plant grows in dry, rocky canyon habitat, anchoring in rock cracks and crevices.

Threats to the survival of the plant include blasting and aphid damage.
