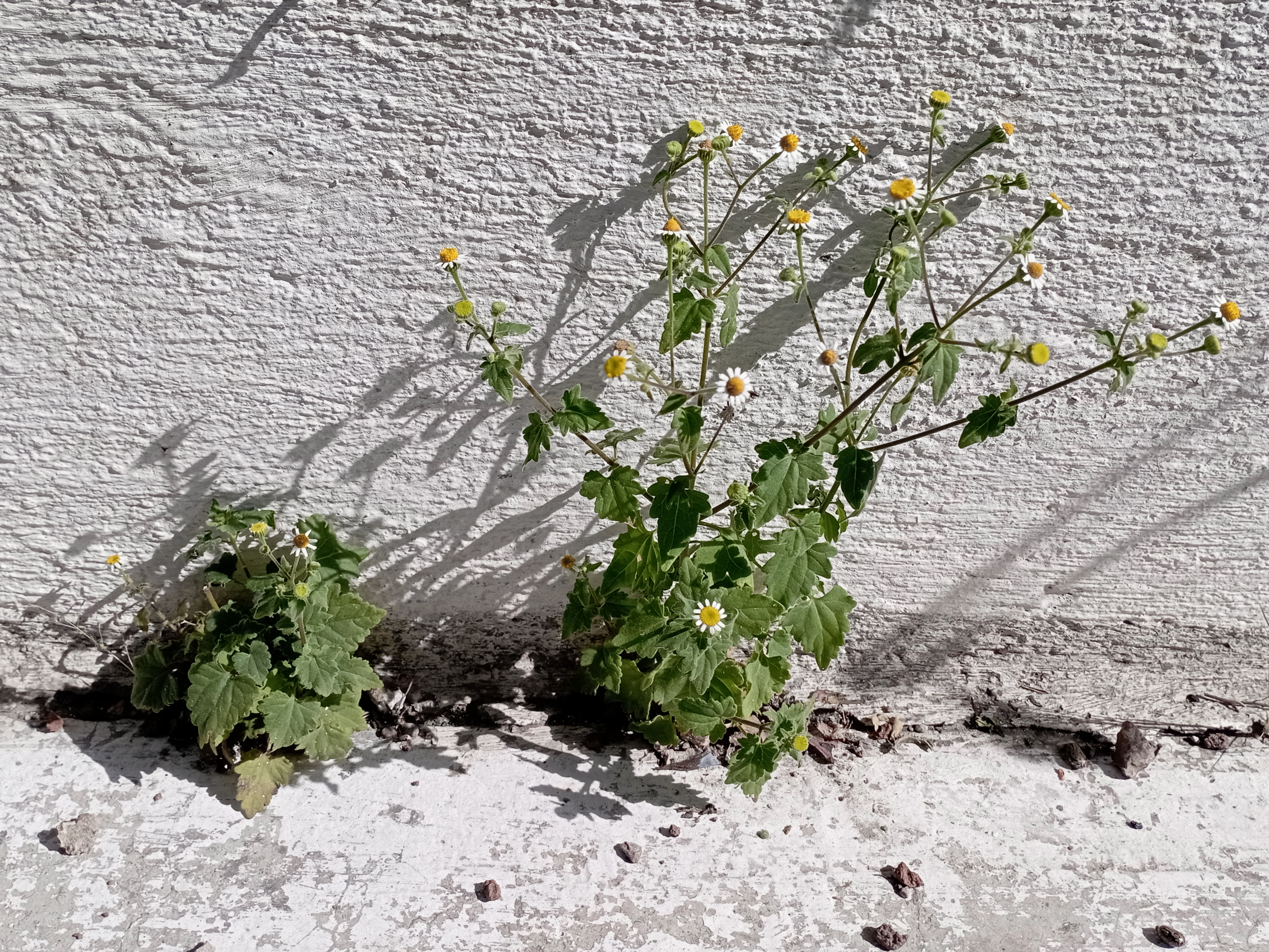
- Galinsogeopsis spilanthoides

Scientific classification
- Kingdom: Plantae
- Clade: Tracheophytes
- Clade: Angiosperms
- Clade: Eudicots
- Clade: Asterids
- Order: Asterales
- Family: Asteraceae
- Subfamily: Asteroideae
- Tribe: Perityleae
- Subtribe: Peritylinae
- Genus: Galinsogeopsis; Sch.Bip. (1856)

Species
- 18; see text

Synonyms
- Correllia A.M.Powell (1973)

= Galinsogeopsis =

Genus of flowering plants

Galinsogeopsis is a genus of flowering plants in the family Asteraceae. It includes 18 species native to Mexico and the southwestern United States, ranging from Arizona, New Mexico, and Texas to southern Mexico.

== Species ==
18 species are accepted.

- Galinsogeopsis canescens (Everly) Lichter-Marck
- Galinsogeopsis ciliata (L.H.Dewey) Lichter-Marck
- Galinsogeopsis coronopifolia (A.Gray) Lichter-Marck
- Galinsogeopsis feddemae (McVaugh) Lichter-Marck
- Galinsogeopsis glaucescens (B.L.Turner) Lichter-Marck
- Galinsogeopsis harkerae (P.Carrillo) Lichter-Marck
- Galinsogeopsis hofmeisteria (Rydb.) Lichter-Marck
- Galinsogeopsis jaliscana (A.Gray) Lichter-Marck
- Galinsogeopsis lineariloba (Rydb.) Lichter-Marck
- Galinsogeopsis microcephala (A.Gray) Lichter-Marck
- Galinsogeopsis montana (A.M.Powell) Lichter-Marck
- Galinsogeopsis pennellii (B.L.Turner) Lichter-Marck
- Galinsogeopsis pseudociliata (A.M.Powell & Yarb.) Lichter-Marck
- Galinsogeopsis scopulorum M.E.Jones) Lichter-Marck
- Galinsogeopsis spilanthoides Sch.Bip.
- Galinsogeopsis stevensii (B.L.Turner) Lichter-Marck
- Galinsogeopsis turneri (A.M.Powell) Lichter-Marck
- Galinsogeopsis vigilans (Spellenb. & A.M.Powell) Lichter-Marck
