= Silver-spotted skipper =

Silver-spotted skipper is the common English name given to three species of butterfly:

- In Europe, Hesperia comma
- In North America, Epargyreus clarus
- In Australia, Trapezites argenteoornatus
