= Lycapsus =

Scientific classification
- Kingdom: Plantae
- Clade: Embryophytes
- Clade: Tracheophytes
- Clade: Angiosperms
- Clade: Eudicots
- Clade: Asterids
- Order: Asterales
- Family: Asteraceae
- Subfamily: Asteroideae
- Tribe: Perityleae
- Subtribe: Lycapsinae; H.Rob.
- Genus: Lycapsus; Phil.
- Species: L. tenuifolius

Binomial name
- Lycapsus tenuifolius Phil.

Synonyms
- Alomia tenuifolia (Phil.) Benth. & Hook.f. ex Reiche

Species of plant

Lycapsus is a genus of flowering plants in the tribe Perityleae within the family Asteraceae.

Species

There is only one known species, Lycapsus tenuifolius, native to Chile in South America.
