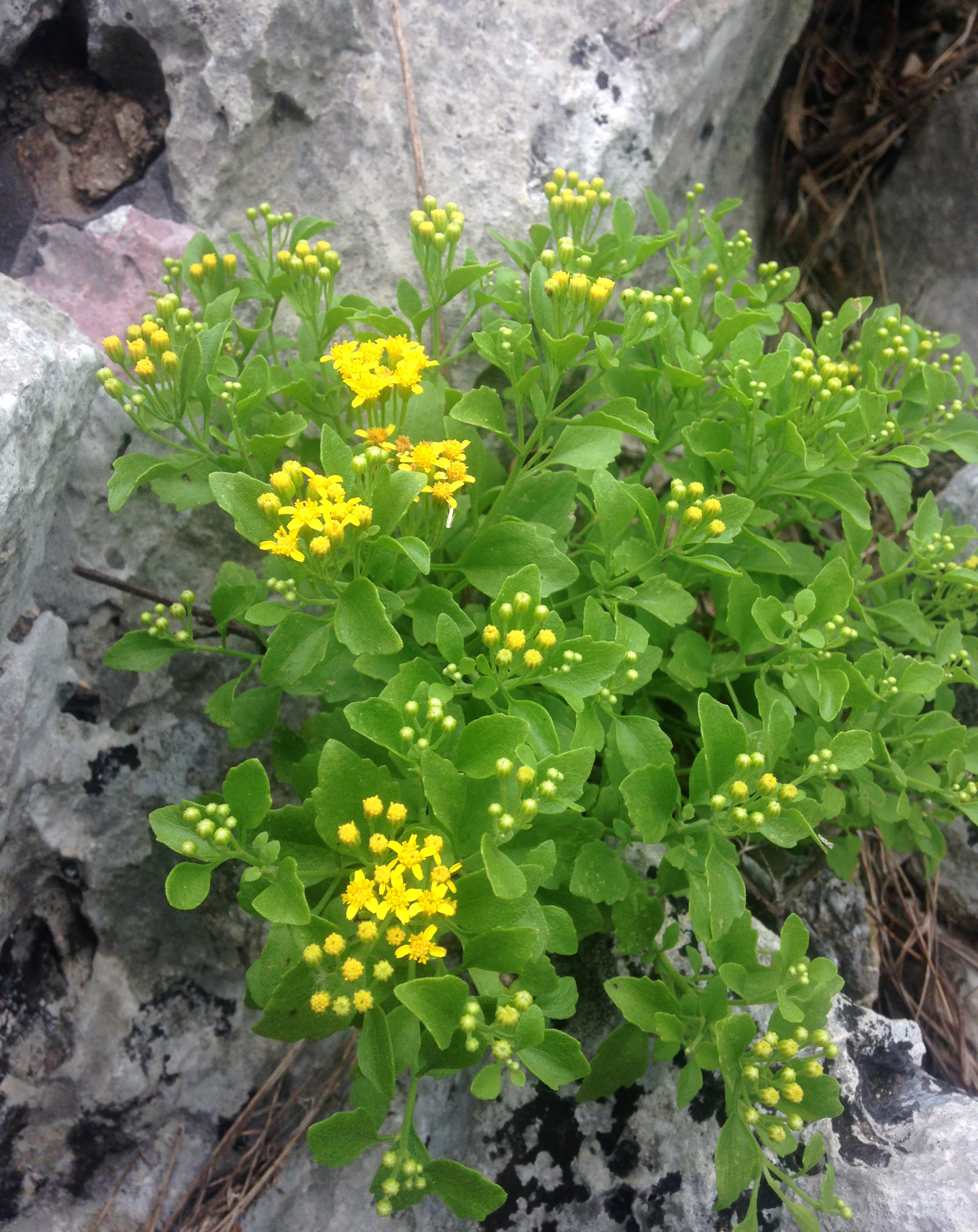

Scientific classification
- Kingdom: Plantae
- Clade: Tracheophytes
- Clade: Angiosperms
- Clade: Eudicots
- Clade: Asterids
- Order: Asterales
- Family: Asteraceae
- Genus: Laphamia
- Species: L. lindheimeri

Binomial name
- Laphamia lindheimeri A.Gray (1852)

Varieties
- Laphamia lindheimeri var. halimifolia (A.Gray) Lichter-Marck; Laphamia lindheimeri var. lindheimeri

Synonyms
- Laphamia halimifolia subsp. lindheimeri (A.Gray) W.E.Niles (1970); Perityle lindheimeri (A.Gray) Shinners (1959)

= Laphamia lindheimeri =

Species of flowering plant

Laphamia lindheimeri, commonly called Lindheimer's rock daisy, is a species of flowering plant in the aster family (Asteraceae). It is native to the United States, where it is endemic to the Edwards Plateau of Texas.

Its natural habitat is in crevices of Cretaceous-age limestone rock, often near streams or springs.

Laphamia lindheimeri is a perennial subshrub. It produces a yellow inflorescence, with both ray and disk flowers. It blooms from spring through fall.

Two varieties are accepted.

- Laphamia lindheimeri var. halimifolia (A.Gray) Lichter-Marck (synonyms Laphamia halimifolia A.Gray, Perityle halimifolia (A.Gray) Shinners, and Perityle lindheimeri var. halimifolia (A.Gray) A.M.Powell)
- Laphamia lindheimeri var. lindheimeri (synonyms Laphamia rotundata Rydb. and Perityle rotundata (Rydb.) Shinners)
