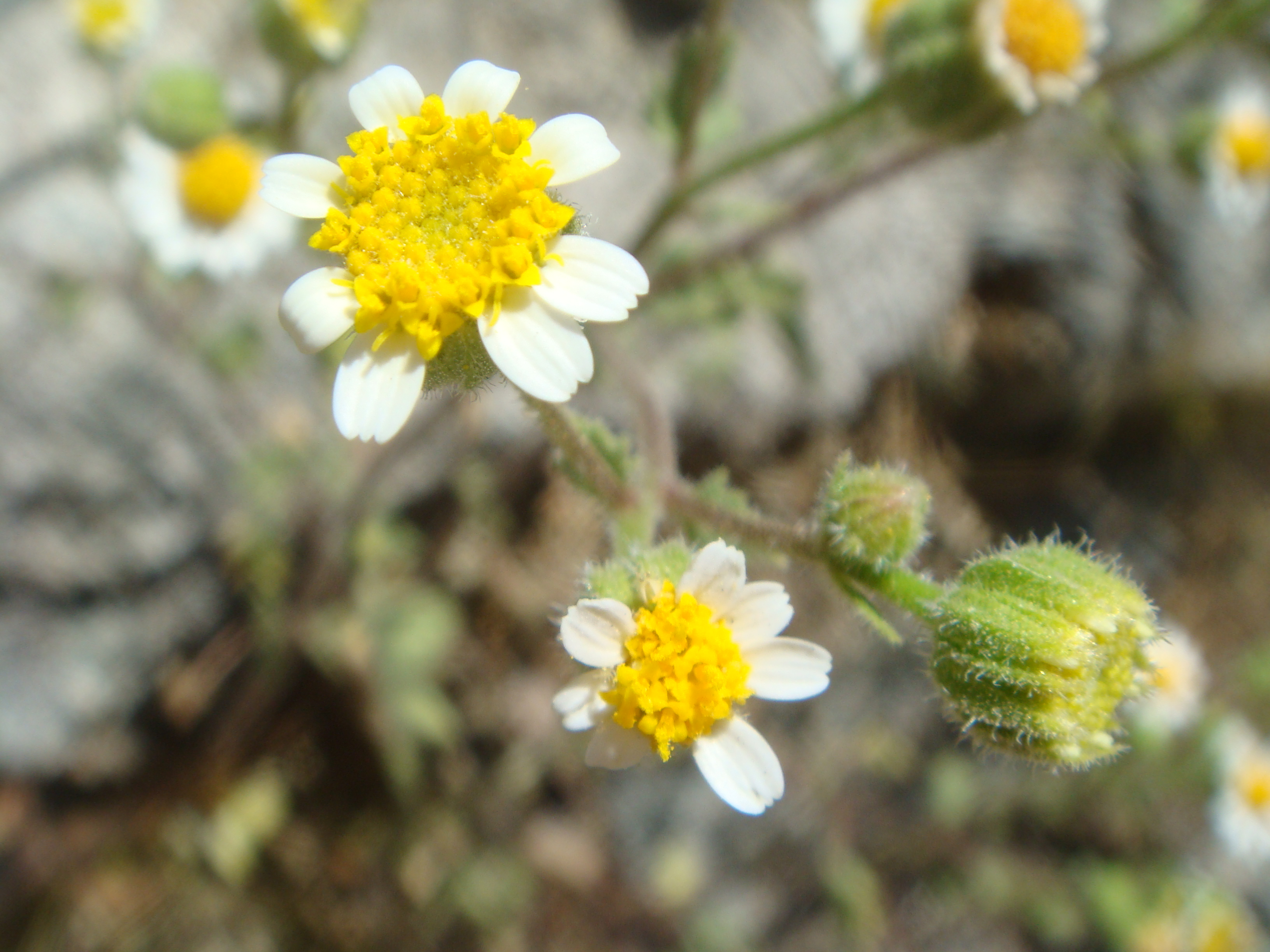

Scientific classification
- Kingdom: Plantae
- Clade: Tracheophytes
- Clade: Angiosperms
- Clade: Eudicots
- Clade: Asterids
- Order: Asterales
- Family: Asteraceae
- Genus: Perityle
- Species: P. emoryi

Binomial name
- Perityle emoryi Torr.

= Perityle emoryi =

Species of flowering plant

Perityle emoryi is a species of flowering plant in the aster family known by the common name Emory's rockdaisy. It is native to the Southwestern United States, northwestern Mexico, and western South America. It is a common wildflower of the deserts, and can also be found in the coastal regions of the Californias, Sonora, and Sinaloa.

It grows in many types of habitat, it tolerates disturbance, and it can become somewhat weedy. it is an introduced species in parts of Hawaii. Its distribution is apparently expanding.

== Description ==
Perityle emoryi is a polyploid plant species that exhibits considerable genetic and morphological variability. It is an annual herb ranging from 2 to 60 centimeters in height, with stems that may be small, delicate, and unbranched, or thick, branching, and sprawling. The plant is typically hairy and glandular in texture. Leaves are alternately arranged and borne on petioles, with blades that vary in shape and may be toothed or lobed.

The inflorescence consists of either a solitary flower head or a cluster of several heads. Each head is hemispherical to bell-shaped and usually less than one centimeter wide. It features a central cluster of numerous golden disc florets surrounded by 8 to 12 white ray florets, each only a few millimeters in length. The fruit is an achene, often tipped with a pappus.

== Distribution and habitat ==
Perityle emoryi is naturally distributed throughout southwestern North America and western South America, an amphitropical distribution.

In North America, it is distributed across the deserts of Arizona, California, Baja California, Baja California Sur, Nevada, Utah, Sonora, and Sinaloa. In Southern California it is also rarely found in coastal regions and the Peninsular Ranges, and becomes widespread throughout almost all the ecosystems of the Baja California peninsula, except for the Cape region and higher mountains.

Perityle emoryi is also found on the eastern Pacific island of Guadalupe.
