= Native Plant Society of Texas =

U.S. non-profit organization

- Abbreviation: NPSOT
- Formation: 1981; 45 years ago
- Founder: Carroll Abbott
- Founded at: Denton, Texas
- Type: Nonprofit
- Tax ID no.: 74-2697896
- Legal status: 501(c)(3)
- Headquarters: P. O. Box 3017, Fredericksburg, Texas
- Board President: Ricky Linex
- Executive Director: Meg Inglis
- Board of directors: Amy Birdwell; Kim Conrow; Meghan Doherty; Linda Knowles; Mead LeBlanc; Laura Legett; Ricky Linex; Clarence Reed
- Website: npsot.org

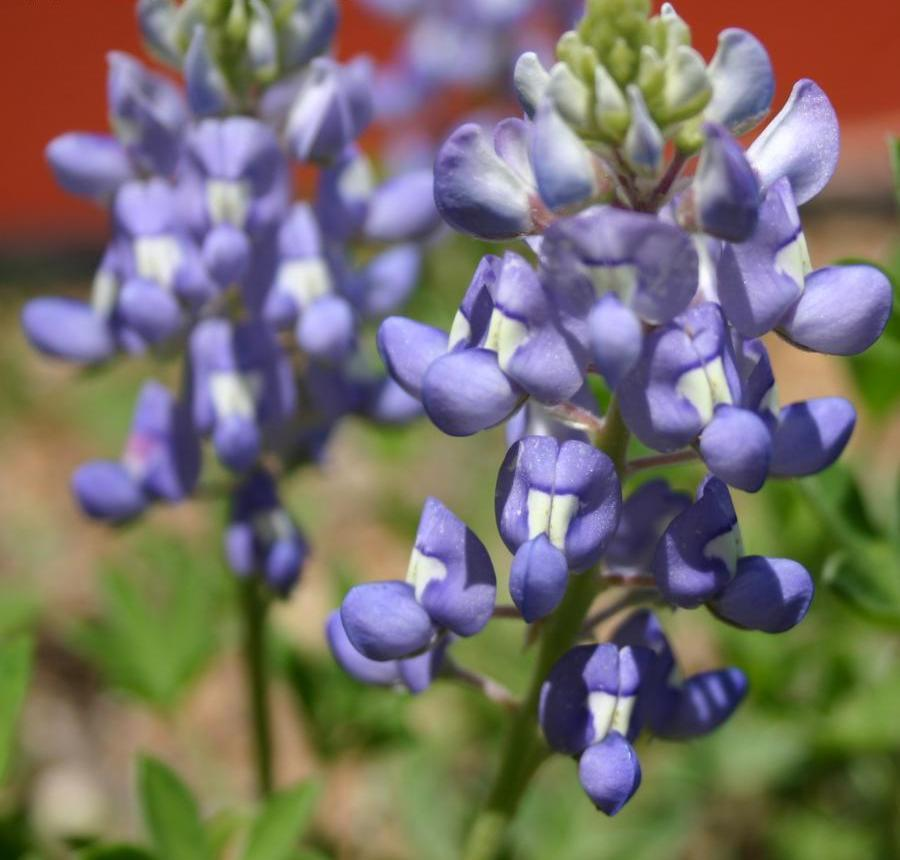
Texas bluebonnet (Lupinus texensis), a native plant and state flower of Texas

The Native Plant Society of Texas is a Texas not-for-profit conservation organization that promotes the "conservation, research and utilization of the native plants and plant habitats of Texas through education, outreach and example".

The organization includes both statewide programs and local chapters. Over 4,000 members and volunteers in 34 local chapters throughout the state participate in community work projects, plant surveys, workshops, landscaping projects, and demonstration gardens. Members range from amateur plant enthusiasts and gardeners to professional botanists and horticulturists, alongside naturalists, hikers, and nature photographers.

The organization is funded by a combination of gifts, grants and membership dues. The Native Plant Society of Texas was founded in 1981 by Carroll Abbott, of Kerrville, Texas, and sponsored by several members of the faculty of Texas Woman's University, along with other interested individuals.

The Native Plant Society of Texas publishes a quarterly magazine including news about organization activities as well as stories and photographs on native plants and native plant habitats in Texas and related items.

== Goals ==
The Native Plant Society of Texas aims to educate both its members and the general public and to foster a greater awareness of the Texas native flora; to encourage landscaping with appropriate native plants; to protect, conserve and restore native plants threatened by development; to encourage the responsible propagation of native plants; and to promote appreciation and understanding of current, historical and potential uses of native plants.

== Programs ==
The Native Plant Partners program is a collaborative effort between the Society and local growers and retail nurseries to make native plants more available to consumers. Local chapters choose the native plants for their area and publicize them at nurseries with special displays and other publicity.

The Native Landscape Certification Program is a series of day-long classes that teach the practice of using native plants in home and commercial landscapes. Classes are available in the spring and fall to members and non-members in many areas of the state.

The Bring Back the Monarch to Texas Program encourages the preservation of native milkweed and nectar plants along the central flyway of this migrating species. Grants are awarded to schools and communities to create waystations for the monarch butterflies. A seed-gathering program is helping to increase the availability of milkweed. The organization has also built and maintains Monarch Waystations at some rest areas along Interstate 35 in Texas, in cooperation with the Texas Department of Transportation.

The organization awards grants each year to promote native plant research by graduate students at Texas universities, and also awards scholarships to undergraduates.

There is an annual awards banquet that recognizes publications, research, and other activities in the field of native Texas plants.

== Chapter activities ==
Chapters of the Native Plant Society of Texas organize many events of local significance. In keeping with the public outreach and education mission of the society, these events are usually free and open to the public.

- Native plant sales in spring and fall
- General meetings with monthly or bimonthly frequency
- Lectures, talks, and workshops
- Field trips

== Annual symposiums ==
Every fall an annual multi-day educational symposium is held in a different vegetational region of Texas celebrating the unique flora of the region. The symposium features an awards banquet, exhibitions, lectures, and field trips within the region. The Society also holds a one-day symposium in the spring at Lady Bird Johnson Wildflower Center in Austin.
