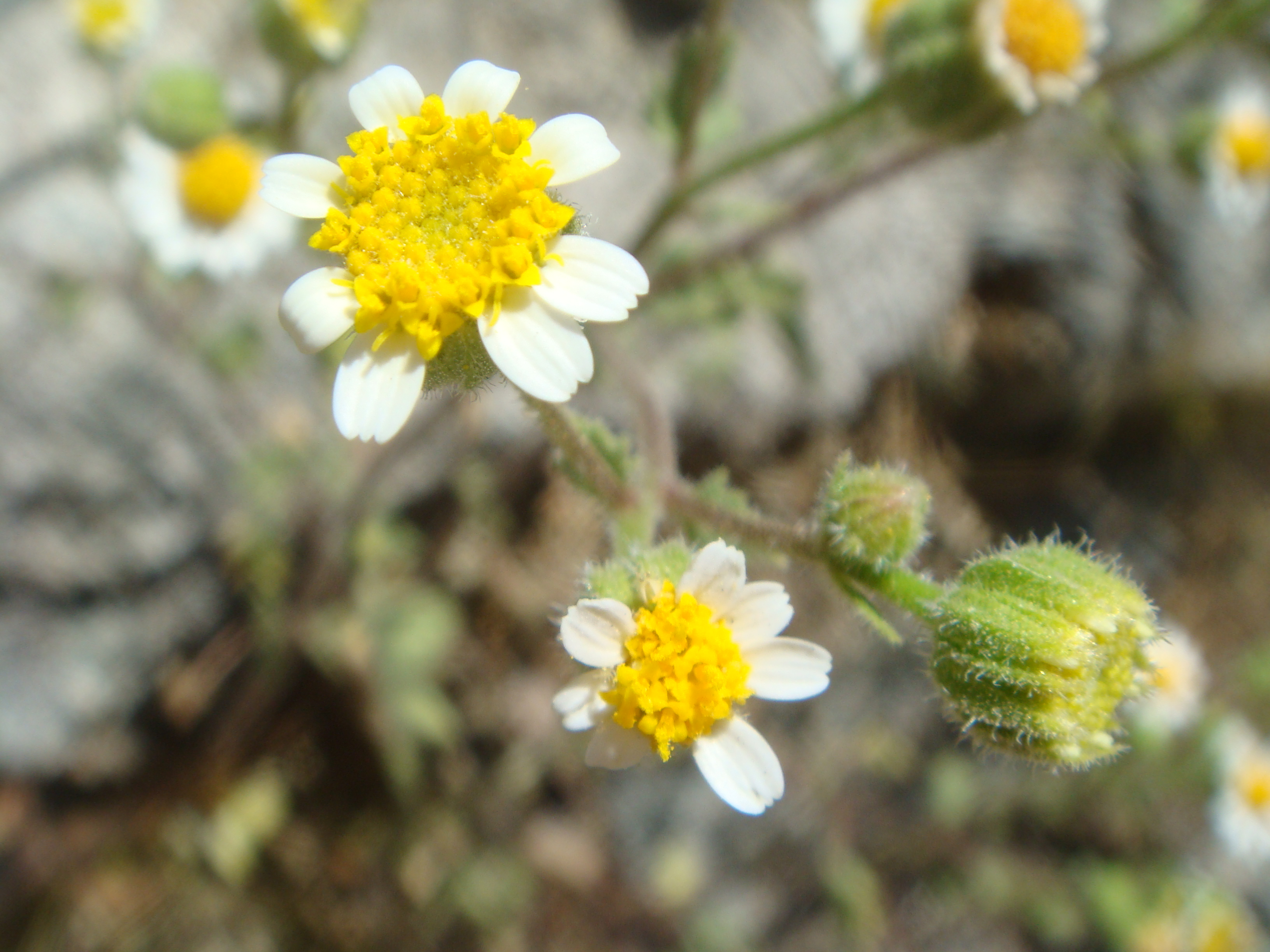
- Perityle emoryi

Scientific classification
- Kingdom: Plantae
- Clade: Tracheophytes
- Clade: Angiosperms
- Clade: Eudicots
- Clade: Asterids
- Order: Asterales
- Family: Asteraceae
- Subfamily: Asteroideae
- Tribe: Perityleae; Baldwin et al. 2002

Genera
- Amauria; Eutetras; Galeana; Lycapsus; Pericome; Perityle; Villanova

= Perityleae =

Tribe of flowering plants

Perityleae is a tribe of flowering plants in the subfamily Asteroideae. The species of its genera are native exclusively to the New World.

This tribe is closely related to the Eupatorieae tribe. It was classified as a separate tribe following molecular studies of plastid DNA sequences.

== Subtribes and genera ==
Perityleae subtribes and genera recognized by the Global Compositae Database as of April 2022:

- Subtribe Galeaninae Panero & B.G.Baldwin
  - Galeana La Llave
  - Villanova Lag.
- Subtribe Lycapsinae H.Rob.
  - Lycapsus Phil.
- Subtribe Peritylinae
  - Amauria Benth.
  - Eutetras A.Gray
  - Pericome A.Gray
  - Perityle Benth.
