= List of Pleurothallis species =

Pleurothallis is a large genus that previously contained about 1240 orchids from the orchid family (Orchidaceae). As of 2020, Kew's Plants of the World Online listed around 540 species in the genus.

Many species formerly classified in the genus Pleurothallis have been transferred to other genera.

== Species ==
- Pleurothallis abortiva Luer
- Pleurothallis acestrophylla Luer
- Pleurothallis acutidentata Cogn.
- Pleurothallis acutilabia Luer
- Pleurothallis adeleae Luer
- Pleurothallis adelphe Luer & Hirtz
- Pleurothallis adonis Luer
- Pleurothallis adventurae Karremans & Bogarín
- Pleurothallis aggeris Luer
- Pleurothallis aguirrei Luer & R.Escobar
- Pleurothallis alborosea (Kraenzl.) Porto & Brade
- Pleurothallis allenii L.O.Williams
- Pleurothallis alopex Luer
- Pleurothallis altimonile Luer & R.Escobar
- Pleurothallis alvaroi Luer & R.Escobar
- Pleurothallis alveolata Luer
- Pleurothallis ambyx Luer & R.Escobar
- Pleurothallis amentacea Luer & Toscano
- Pleurothallis amphigya Luer & R.Escobar
- Pleurothallis amplectens Luer
- Pleurothallis anceps Luer
- Pleurothallis andina (Schltr.) Luer
- Pleurothallis andreae Mark Wilson, B.T.Larsen & J.Portilla
- Pleurothallis andreettae (Luer) J.M.H.Shaw
- Pleurothallis angustissima (Luer & Hirtz) J.M.H.Shaw
- Pleurothallis ankyloglossa Luer & Hirtz
- Pleurothallis annectens Luer
- Pleurothallis antennifera Lindl.
- Pleurothallis anthrax Luer & R.Escobar
- Pleurothallis anthurioides A.Doucette
- Pleurothallis apopsis Luer
- Pleurothallis aporosis Luer
- Pleurothallis applanata Luer & Dalström
- Pleurothallis arachnopsis H.G.Jones
- Pleurothallis archicolonae Luer
- Pleurothallis archidonae Lindl.
- Pleurothallis archidonopsis Luer & Hirtz
- Pleurothallis archilarum Chiron
- Pleurothallis arctata Luer
- Pleurothallis arietina Ames
- Pleurothallis ascera Luer & R.Escobar
- Pleurothallis aspergillum Luer & Hirtz
- Pleurothallis asplundii Luer
- Pleurothallis atrohiata Dod
- Pleurothallis aurita C.Schweinf.
- Pleurothallis baccata (Luer) J.M.H.Shaw
- Pleurothallis baezensis (Luer & Hirtz) J.M.H.Shaw
- Pleurothallis bangii Rolfe ex Britton
- Pleurothallis barbata Westc.
- Pleurothallis barrowii Schuit.
- Pleurothallis batrachus Luer & Hirtz
- Pleurothallis baudoensis Luer & R.Escobar
- Pleurothallis belocardia Schltr.
- Pleurothallis bicallosa Luer & Hirtz
- Pleurothallis bicochlearis Luer
- Pleurothallis bicornis Lindl.
- Pleurothallis bicruris Lindl.
- Pleurothallis biserrula Rchb.f.
- Pleurothallis bitumida Luer
- Pleurothallis bivalvis Lindl.
- Pleurothallis blepharopetala Schltr.
- Pleurothallis bogarinii Pupulin & J.D.Zuñiga
- Pleurothallis bothros Luer
- Pleurothallis bovilingua Luer & R.Escobar
- Pleurothallis bowmanni Rchb.f.
- Pleurothallis brachiata Luer
- Pleurothallis braidiana (Luer) Karremans
- Pleurothallis brittoniana Rolfe ex Britton
- Pleurothallis bucculenta Luer
- Pleurothallis bucranon Luer & Hirtz
- Pleurothallis bulbosa (Luer & R.Escobar) Pfahl
- Pleurothallis cachabensis Luer & Hirtz
- Pleurothallis cajamarcae Schltr.
- Pleurothallis calamifolia Luer & R.Escobar
- Pleurothallis calceolaris Rchb.f.
- Pleurothallis callifera C.Schweinf.
- Pleurothallis calogramma Luer
- Pleurothallis calolalax Luer & R.Escobar
- Pleurothallis calvariola Luer & R.Escobar
- Pleurothallis canaligera Rchb.f.
- Pleurothallis candida Luer & Hirtz
- Pleurothallis caniceps Luer
- Pleurothallis canidentis Luer & R.Escobar
- Pleurothallis capitonis Luer & R.Escobar
- Pleurothallis caprina Luer & R.Escobar
- Pleurothallis cardiochila L.O.Williams
- Pleurothallis cardiocrepis Rchb.f.
- Pleurothallis cardiophylax Rchb.f.
- Pleurothallis cardiostola Rchb.f.
- Pleurothallis cardiothallis Rchb.f.
- Pleurothallis carduela (Luer) J.M.H.Shaw
- Pleurothallis carnosa Braid
- Pleurothallis carrenoi Carnevali & I.Ramírez
- Pleurothallis cassidata Luer & R.Escobar
- Pleurothallis castanea Mark Wilson, G.Merino & J.D.Werner
- Pleurothallis catharinensis Cogn.
- Pleurothallis caucensis Mark Wilson
- Pleurothallis cauda-hirundinis Luer & J.Portilla
- Pleurothallis cauda-phocae Luer & Hirtz
- Pleurothallis cedrinorum Luer & Dalström
- Pleurothallis centranthera Lindl.
- Pleurothallis cernua Luer
- Pleurothallis chama Luer
- Pleurothallis chaparensis (Luer & R.Vásquez) J.M.H.Shaw
- Pleurothallis chavezii Luer
- Pleurothallis chicalensis M.M.Jiménez & Baquero
- Pleurothallis chloroleuca Lindl.
- Pleurothallis chuscalica Luer
- Pleurothallis circinata Luer
- Pleurothallis claudii Rchb.f. ex Dod
- Pleurothallis cleistogama Luer
- Pleurothallis cobriformis L.O.Williams
- Pleurothallis colossus Kraenzl. ex Kerch.
- Pleurothallis complanata Luer & Hirtz
- Pleurothallis compressa Luer
- Pleurothallis condorensis Luer & Hirtz
- Pleurothallis conformalis Luer & Dalström
- Pleurothallis conicostigma Luer
- Pleurothallis constricta Luer & R.Escobar
- Pleurothallis convexa Luer & Hirtz
- Pleurothallis cordata (Ruiz & Pav.) Lindl.
- Pleurothallis cordifolia Rchb.f. & H.Wagener
- Pleurothallis coriacardia Rchb.f.
- Pleurothallis cornualis Luer
- Pleurothallis correllii Luer
- Pleurothallis corysta Luer
- Pleurothallis cosmetron Luer
- Pleurothallis cotyligera Luer & R.Escobar
- Pleurothallis crateriformis C.Schweinf.
- Pleurothallis crescentilabia Ames
- Pleurothallis cristata (Barb.Rodr.) Cogn.
- Pleurothallis crocodiliceps Rchb.f.
- Pleurothallis crossota Luer & Dalström
- Pleurothallis crucifera Luer & Hirtz
- Pleurothallis cubitoria Luer
- Pleurothallis culpameae (Luer) J.M.H.Shaw
- Pleurothallis cultellifolis Barb.Rodr.
- Pleurothallis cunabularis Luer
- Pleurothallis curvifructa H.G.Jones
- Pleurothallis cutucuensis Luer
- Pleurothallis cuzcoensis (Luer) Karremans
- Pleurothallis cyanea Luer & R.Escobar
- Pleurothallis cymbiformis Dod
- Pleurothallis cymbisepala Schltr.
- Pleurothallis cypelligera Luer & Hirtz
- Pleurothallis dariensis (Kolan. & Szlach.) Bogarín
- Pleurothallis dasypetala Luer & Hirtz
- Pleurothallis davisii Luer & Endara
- Pleurothallis deflexa Luer
- Pleurothallis dejavu Luer & Hirtz
- Pleurothallis delascioi Carnevali & I.Ramírez
- Pleurothallis demissa Luer & R.Vásquez
- Pleurothallis dentipetala Rolfe ex Ames
- Pleurothallis depressa Luer & R.Escobar
- Pleurothallis deuterowerneri J.M.H.Shaw
- Pleurothallis deutrodriessenii J.M.H.Shaw
- Pleurothallis dewildei Luer & R.Escobar
- Pleurothallis diabolica Luer & R.Escobar
- Pleurothallis diazii (Luer & Endara) J.M.H.Shaw
- Pleurothallis dibolia Luer
- Pleurothallis dichotoma (Poepp. & Endl.) Schltr.
- Pleurothallis dilemma Luer
- Pleurothallis discoidea Lindl.
- Pleurothallis divaricans Schltr.
- Pleurothallis dorotheae Luer
- Pleurothallis dorrii Luer
- Pleurothallis doucetteana L.E.Matthews
- Pleurothallis dracuncula (Luer & Hirtz) J.M.H.Shaw
- Pleurothallis dressleriana Bogarín
- Pleurothallis drewii Luer
- Pleurothallis driessenii Luer
- Pleurothallis dubbeldamii Luer
- Pleurothallis dukei Luer
- Pleurothallis dunstervillei Foldats
- Pleurothallis duplex Luer & R.Escobar
- Pleurothallis eccentrica Luer & Hirtz
- Pleurothallis ecomingae M.M.Jiménez, Baquero & Mark Wilson
- Pleurothallis eduardoi Mark Wilson
- Pleurothallis eidos Luer
- Pleurothallis ekmanii Schltr.
- Pleurothallis elvirana Carnevali & I.Ramírez
- Pleurothallis ensata Luer
- Pleurothallis epiglottis Luer
- Pleurothallis erythrium Luer
- Pleurothallis escobarii (Luer) J.M.H.Shaw
- Pleurothallis eumecocaulon Schltr.
- Pleurothallis excavata Schltr.
- Pleurothallis excentrica (Luer) Luer
- Pleurothallis fantastica Ames
- Pleurothallis fastidiosa Luer
- Pleurothallis flaveola Luer & Hirtz
- Pleurothallis flavomarginata A.Doucette, H.Medina & J.Portilla
- Pleurothallis folsomii (Luer & Endara) J.M.H.Shaw
- Pleurothallis fonnegrae (Luer & Endara) J.M.H.Shaw
- Pleurothallis forceps-cancri Luer & R.Escobar
- Pleurothallis fossulata Luer & R.Escobar
- Pleurothallis franciana Sierra-Ariza
- Pleurothallis fugax Luer & R.Escobar
- Pleurothallis furcifera Luer
- Pleurothallis fustifera Luer
- Pleurothallis galerita Luer
- Pleurothallis ganymedes Luer & R.Escobar
- Pleurothallis garayana (Ospina) Luer
- Pleurothallis gargantua Luer
- Pleurothallis genychila Schltr.
- Pleurothallis geographica Luer
- Pleurothallis gigiportillae A.Doucette & J.Portilla
- Pleurothallis giraffa Luer
- Pleurothallis giraldoi Luer
- Pleurothallis glabra Luer & R.Escobar
- Pleurothallis globosa Luer & R.Escobar
- Pleurothallis glochis Luer & R.Escobar
- Pleurothallis glossopogon Rchb.f.
- Pleurothallis gomezii Luer & R.Escobar
- Pleurothallis gracilicolumna Mark Wilson
- Pleurothallis gracilipedunculata Foldats
- Pleurothallis grandiflora Lindl.
- Pleurothallis gratiosa Rchb.f.
- Pleurothallis grobleri (Luer & Hirtz) J.M.H.Shaw
- Pleurothallis gustavoi Mark Wilson
- Pleurothallis gutierrezii Luer
- Pleurothallis habenula Luer & R.Escobar
- Pleurothallis hammelii Luer
- Pleurothallis harpago Luer
- Pleurothallis hartwegii Lindl.
- Pleurothallis hawkingii Karremans & J.E.Jiménez
- Pleurothallis hawkinsii (Luer & Endara) J.M.H.Shaw
- Pleurothallis helleri A.D.Hawkes
- Pleurothallis hemileuca Luer
- Pleurothallis hemisphaerica Luer & R.Escobar
- Pleurothallis henniae Luer & Dalström
- Pleurothallis hippocrepica Luer & R.Escobar
- Pleurothallis hirtziana J.M.H.Shaw
- Pleurothallis hispidula (Luer & R.Escobar) J.M.H.Shaw
- Pleurothallis hitchcockii Ames
- Pleurothallis hjertingii Luer
- Pleurothallis hoeijeri Luer & Hirtz
- Pleurothallis holtonii Luer
- Pleurothallis homalantha Schltr.
- Pleurothallis homeroi (Luer & Endara) J.M.H.Shaw
- Pleurothallis imbaburae Luer & Hirtz
- Pleurothallis imber-florum Luer & R.Escobar
- Pleurothallis imitor Luer
- Pleurothallis imperialis Luer
- Pleurothallis incongrua Luer
- Pleurothallis indecora Rodr.-Mart. & Karremans
- Pleurothallis index Luer
- Pleurothallis inflata Rolfe
- Pleurothallis inornata Luer & Hirtz
- Pleurothallis instar Luer
- Pleurothallis ipyrangana Schltr.
- Pleurothallis iris (Luer & Endara) J.M.H.Shaw
- Pleurothallis isthmica Luer
- Pleurothallis jacarepaguaensis Barb.Rodr.
- Pleurothallis jaculifera Luer & R.Escobar
- Pleurothallis jaramilloi Luer
- Pleurothallis jostii Mark Wilson & J.Portilla
- Pleurothallis jupiter Luer
- Pleurothallis juvenilis Rodr.-Mart. & Karremans
- Pleurothallis karlii Pabst
- Pleurothallis kaynagata A.Doucette, Mark Wilson & J.Portilla
- Pleurothallis kelloggii Archila
- Pleurothallis kellogiae Archila
- Pleurothallis kelsoae Mark Wilson, B.T.Larsen & J.Portilla
- Pleurothallis kerrii Braga
- Pleurothallis killipii Garay
- Pleurothallis knappiae Luer
- Pleurothallis lacera Luer
- Pleurothallis lamellaris Lindl.
- Pleurothallis languida Luer & R.Escobar
- Pleurothallis latipetala Garay
- Pleurothallis lemniscifolia Luer
- Pleurothallis lenae Luer & Dalström
- Pleurothallis leopardina Luer
- Pleurothallis leucantha Schltr.
- Pleurothallis lilijae Foldats
- Pleurothallis lindenii Lindl.
- Pleurothallis linearis (Lindl.) Lindl.
- Pleurothallis linguifera Lindl.
- Pleurothallis litotes Luer
- Pleurothallis llanganatensis (Luer & Hirtz) J.M.H.Shaw
- Pleurothallis lobata Luer
- Pleurothallis loejtnantii Luer
- Pleurothallis londonoi Luer
- Pleurothallis longipedicellata Ames & C.Schweinf.
- Pleurothallis lopezii Luer & R.Escobar
- Pleurothallis loranthophylla Rchb.f.
- Pleurothallis loreae Carnevali & I.Ramírez
- Pleurothallis luctuosa Rchb.f.
- Pleurothallis lueriana Karremans & Rodr.-Mart.
- Pleurothallis luna-crescens Pupulin, J.Aguilar & Mel.Fernández
- Pleurothallis lunaris Luer & R.Escobar
- Pleurothallis lutheri (Luer & Endara) J.M.H.Shaw
- Pleurothallis lynniana (Luer) Pfahl
- Pleurothallis macra Lindl.
- Pleurothallis macrocardia Rchb.f.
- Pleurothallis madsenii Luer
- Pleurothallis maduroi Luer
- Pleurothallis magnifica Luer & R.Escobar
- Pleurothallis magnipetala C.Schweinf.
- Pleurothallis mammillata Luer
- Pleurothallis manicosa Luer & R.Escobar
- Pleurothallis manningiana Mark Wilson, Salas Guerr. & B.T.Larsen
- Pleurothallis mantiquyrana Barb.Rodr.
- Pleurothallis marioi Zambrano & Solano
- Pleurothallis marthae Luer & R.Escobar
- Pleurothallis mastodon Luer & Hirtz
- Pleurothallis matudana C.Schweinf.
- Pleurothallis medinae Luer & J.Portilla
- Pleurothallis medusa Luer
- Pleurothallis megaglossa Luer & Dalström
- Pleurothallis megalorhina Luer & R.Escobar
- Pleurothallis megalotis Luer & Hirtz
- Pleurothallis melanosticta Luer
- Pleurothallis membracidoides Luer
- Pleurothallis micklowii Luer & R.Vásquez
- Pleurothallis microcardia Rchb.f.
- Pleurothallis microchila L.O.Williams
- Pleurothallis millei Schltr.
- Pleurothallis miniatura (Luer, Thoerle & F.Werner) J.M.H.Shaw
- Pleurothallis minutilabia Mark Wilson, Tobar & Á.J.Pérez
- Pleurothallis miranda Luer
- Pleurothallis mocoana Schltr.
- Pleurothallis mundula Luer & R.Escobar
- Pleurothallis muriculata Luer & Hirtz
- Pleurothallis nanella Luer & Hirtz
- Pleurothallis nangaritzae M.M.Jiménez, Tobar & Mark Wilson
- Pleurothallis narinoensis Rykacz. & Kolan.
- Pleurothallis nasiterna Luer
- Pleurothallis navilinguis Rchb.f.
- Pleurothallis navisepala Pupulin, J.Aguilar & M.Díaz
- Pleurothallis neglecta Pupulin, Bogarín & Mel.Fernández
- Pleurothallis nelsonii Ames
- Pleurothallis neobarbosae J.M.H.Shaw
- Pleurothallis neodubbeldamii J.M.H.Shaw
- Pleurothallis neorinkei A.Doucette
- Pleurothallis neossa (Luer & Hirtz) J.M.H.Shaw
- Pleurothallis nephroglossa Schltr.
- Pleurothallis nipterophylla Luer
- Pleurothallis nitida Luer
- Pleurothallis niveoglobula Luer
- Pleurothallis nossax Luer & R.Escobar
- Pleurothallis notabilis Luer & R.Escobar
- Pleurothallis nox-media Luer & R.Escobar
- Pleurothallis nuda (Klotzsch) Rchb.f.
- Pleurothallis nutans Schltr.
- Pleurothallis obpyriformis Luer
- Pleurothallis ocellus (Luer) Luer
- Pleurothallis octavioi Luer & R.Escobar
- Pleurothallis odobeniceps Luer
- Pleurothallis omoglossa Luer
- Pleurothallis onagriceps Luer & Hirtz
- Pleurothallis oncoglossa Luer
- Pleurothallis orecta Luer & R.Escobar
- Pleurothallis ortegae Luer & Hirtz
- Pleurothallis orthostachys Luer & R.Escobar
- Pleurothallis orygmoglossa (Luer & Dressler) J.M.H.Shaw
- Pleurothallis oscarii Archila & Chiron
- Pleurothallis ottocarii Rodr.-Mart., Rinc.-Useche & Karremans
- Pleurothallis oxapampae Luer
- Pleurothallis pallida Luer
- Pleurothallis palliolata Ames
- Pleurothallis pandurata Luer & Hirtz
- Pleurothallis pansamalae Schltr.
- Pleurothallis papillingua A.Doucette & J.Portilla
- Pleurothallis paquishae Luer
- Pleurothallis paraniesseniae J.M.H.Shaw
- Pleurothallis parviflora Luer
- Pleurothallis peculiaris Luer
- Pleurothallis pedunculata (Klotzsch) Rchb.f.
- Pleurothallis pelex Luer
- Pleurothallis pelicophora Luer
- Pleurothallis penduliflora Kraenzl.
- Pleurothallis penelops Luer
- Pleurothallis penicillata Luer
- Pleurothallis pennelliae Luer
- Pleurothallis perijaensis Dunst.
- Pleurothallis peroniocephala Luer
- Pleurothallis perryi Luer
- Pleurothallis persimilis Luer & Hirtz
- Pleurothallis phalangifera (C.Presl) Rchb.f.
- Pleurothallis phoxophylla Luer
- Pleurothallis phratria Luer & Hirtz
- Pleurothallis phyllocardia Rchb.f.
- Pleurothallis phyllocardioides Schltr.
- Pleurothallis phymatodea Luer
- Pleurothallis pileata Luer & R.Escobar
- Pleurothallis platypetala Luer & R.Escobar
- Pleurothallis platysepala Schltr.
- Pleurothallis poculifera Luer & R.Escobar
- Pleurothallis polysticta Luer
- Pleurothallis portillae Luer
- Pleurothallis praecipua Luer
- Pleurothallis prolaticollaris Luer
- Pleurothallis pruinosa Lindl.
- Pleurothallis pseudopogon Luer & Hirtz
- Pleurothallis ptychophora Luer & Hirtz
- Pleurothallis pudica Pupulin, J.Aguilar & M.Díaz
- Pleurothallis pulcherrima Luer
- Pleurothallis pulvinaris Luer & R.Escobar
- Pleurothallis punctulata Rolfe
- Pleurothallis pyelophera (Luer) Pfahl
- Pleurothallis quadricaudata Schltr.
- Pleurothallis quaternaria Luer
- Pleurothallis queremalensis Rinc.-Useche, Rodr.-Mart. & Karremans
- Pleurothallis questionis Luer & R.Escobar
- Pleurothallis quitu-cara Carrera & Baquero
- Pleurothallis radula Luer
- Pleurothallis ramificans Luer
- Pleurothallis ramiromedinae Thoerle & Hirtz
- Pleurothallis ramosii Luer
- Pleurothallis rectipetala Ames & C.Schweinf.
- Pleurothallis recurvata Luer & Hirtz
- Pleurothallis reginae Garay
- Pleurothallis renieana (Luer & Sijm) J.M.H.Shaw
- Pleurothallis reptans Luer
- Pleurothallis revoluta (Ruiz & Pav.) Garay
- Pleurothallis rhinocera (Luer & Sijm) J.M.H.Shaw
- Pleurothallis rhodoglossa Schltr.
- Pleurothallis ringens C.Schweinf.
- Pleurothallis ripleyi Luer
- Pleurothallis robusta (Luer & Hirtz) J.M.H.Shaw
- Pleurothallis roseola Luer & Hirtz
- Pleurothallis rowleei Ames
- Pleurothallis ruberrima Lindl.
- Pleurothallis rubrifolia Mark Wilson, Tobar & Salas Guerr.
- Pleurothallis rubroinversa Luer
- Pleurothallis rugosa Luer & R.Escobar
- Pleurothallis rusbyi Rolfe
- Pleurothallis ruscaria Luer
- Pleurothallis ruscifolia (Jacq.) R.Br.
- Pleurothallis rutrifolia (Luer & Hirtz) J.M.H.Shaw
- Pleurothallis saccatilabia C.Schweinf.
- Pleurothallis sagittilabia Luer
- Pleurothallis saltatoria Lindl.
- Pleurothallis sanchoi Ames
- Pleurothallis sandemanii Luer
- Pleurothallis sanjanae Schltr.
- Pleurothallis sanluisii Foldats
- Pleurothallis sannio Luer & R.Escobar
- Pleurothallis sarcochila Garay
- Pleurothallis saueri (Luer) J.M.H.Shaw
- Pleurothallis scabrilinguis Lindl.
- Pleurothallis scaphipetala Luer
- Pleurothallis schweinfurthii Garay
- Pleurothallis scintillata Luer
- Pleurothallis scoparum Rchb.f.
- Pleurothallis scotinantha Pupulin, M.Díaz & J.Aguilar
- Pleurothallis scurrula Luer
- Pleurothallis secunda Poepp. & Endl.
- Pleurothallis semiscabra Lindl.
- Pleurothallis sergioi Luer & R.Escobar
- Pleurothallis serpens Luer & R.Escobar
- Pleurothallis serricardia Schltr.
- Pleurothallis serrisepala Kraenzl.
- Pleurothallis sextonii Luer
- Pleurothallis sigynes Luer
- Pleurothallis sijmii Luer
- Pleurothallis silvae-pacis Karremans
- Pleurothallis silverstonei Luer
- Pleurothallis simacoana Schltr.
- Pleurothallis simulans L.O.Williams
- Pleurothallis siphoglossa Luer & R.Escobar
- Pleurothallis sirene Rchb.f.
- Pleurothallis sobrina Luer & Hirtz
- Pleurothallis solium Luer
- Pleurothallis solomonii (Luer) J.M.H.Shaw
- Pleurothallis somnolenta Luer
- Pleurothallis sotarae Schltr.
- Pleurothallis spathulifolia C.Schweinf.
- Pleurothallis spathulipetala Luer
- Pleurothallis sphaerantha Luer
- Pleurothallis stelidilabia Luer
- Pleurothallis stellata I.Ramírez & Carnevali
- Pleurothallis stenota Luer
- Pleurothallis stevensonii Luer
- Pleurothallis steyermarkii C.Schweinf.
- Pleurothallis stricta Luer
- Pleurothallis strobilifera F.Lehm. & Kraenzl.
- Pleurothallis subreniformis Schltr.
- Pleurothallis subsinuata Lindl.
- Pleurothallis subtilis C.Schweinf.
- Pleurothallis suiniana D.Aguilar & Karremans
- Pleurothallis superbiens Luer
- Pleurothallis supervacanea Rchb.f.
- Pleurothallis suspensa Luer
- Pleurothallis talpinaria Rchb.f.
- Pleurothallis talpinarioides Garay & Dunst.
- Pleurothallis tamaensis Foldats
- Pleurothallis tandapiensis (Luer & Hirtz) J.M.H.Shaw
- Pleurothallis tanyrhina Luer & R.Escobar
- Pleurothallis taurus Luer
- Pleurothallis teaguei Luer
- Pleurothallis tectosa Luer & Hirtz
- Pleurothallis telamon Luer
- Pleurothallis tenebrosa Luer
- Pleurothallis tentaculata (Poepp. & Endl.) Lindl.
- Pleurothallis tenuisepala Mark Wilson
- Pleurothallis tetrachaeta Luer & Hirtz
- Pleurothallis tetragona Luer & R.Escobar
- Pleurothallis tetroxys Luer
- Pleurothallis thoerleae (Luer) J.M.H.Shaw
- Pleurothallis tiarata Luer & Hirtz
- Pleurothallis tipuloides Luer
- Pleurothallis titan Luer
- Pleurothallis tobarii (Luer & Hirtz) Pfahl
- Pleurothallis tonduzii Schltr.
- Pleurothallis torrana Luer
- Pleurothallis trachysepala Kraenzl.
- Pleurothallis tragulosa Luer & Hirtz
- Pleurothallis transversilabia Carnevali & I.Ramírez
- Pleurothallis tridentata Klotzsch
- Pleurothallis trifurcata Luer & Hirtz
- Pleurothallis trimeroglossa Schltr.
- Pleurothallis tripterocarpa Schltr.
- Pleurothallis troglodytes Luer
- Pleurothallis truncata Lindl.
- Pleurothallis tryssa Luer
- Pleurothallis tuberculosa Luer & Hirtz
- Pleurothallis tuzae Luer
- Pleurothallis tyria Luer & Hirtz
- Pleurothallis undulata Poepp. & Endl.
- Pleurothallis uninervia Luer & Dodson
- Pleurothallis upanoensis Luer & Hirtz
- Pleurothallis urceolata Luer
- Pleurothallis uvifera Luer & R.Escobar
- Pleurothallis valladolidensis Luer
- Pleurothallis valvola Luer & Hirtz
- Pleurothallis variabilis Luer
- Pleurothallis veliformis Luer & Dalström
- Pleurothallis verruculosa Kraenzl.
- Pleurothallis vide-vallis Karremans & J.E.Jiménez
- Pleurothallis viduata Luer
- Pleurothallis vieirae Luer & R.Escobar
- Pleurothallis vinealis Luer & R.Escobar
- Pleurothallis volans Luer & Hirtz
- Pleurothallis volcanica Luer
- Pleurothallis vorator Luer & R.Vásquez
- Pleurothallis wielii Mark Wilson, B.T.Larsen & J.Portilla
- Pleurothallis wigginsii C.Schweinf.
- Pleurothallis xanthochlora Rchb.f.
- Pleurothallis zarumae Luer & Hirtz
