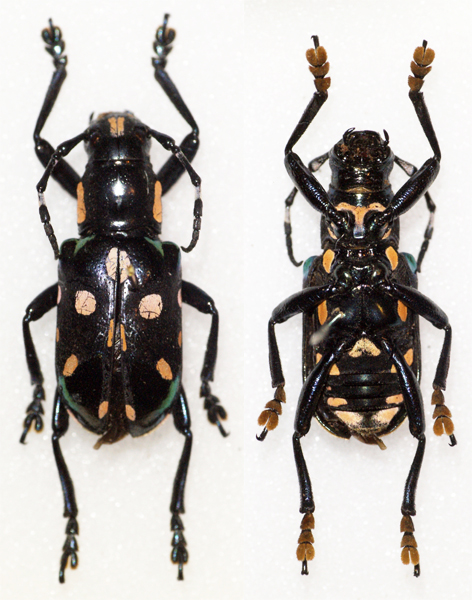

Scientific classification
- Kingdom: Animalia
- Phylum: Arthropoda
- Class: Insecta
- Order: Coleoptera
- Suborder: Polyphaga
- Infraorder: Cucujiformia
- Family: Cerambycidae
- Genus: Mimacronia
- Species: M. decimaculata

Binomial name
- Mimacronia decimaculata (Schultze, 1919)

Synonyms
- Acronia? decimaculata Schultze, 1919

= Mimacronia decimaculata =

Species of beetle

Mimacronia decimaculata is a species of beetle in the family Cerambycidae. It was described by Schultze in 1919, originally under the genus Acronia. It is known from the Philippines.
