= Rhynchopera =

Rhynchopera may refer to two different genera of plants:

- Rhynchopera Klotzsch, a taxonomic synonym for the orchid genus Pleurothallis
- Rhynchopera Börner, a taxonomic synonym for the sedge genus Carex
