= P. nivalis =

P. nivalis may refer to:

- Peperomia nivalis, a radiator plant species
- Phalacrocorax nivalis, a cormorant species
- Phlox nivalis, a flowering plant species
- Pinguicula nivalis, a species described in Carnivorous Plant Newsletter
- Plantago nivalis, a plantain species
- Plectrophenax nivalis, a passerine bird species
- Pleurothallis nivalis, an orchid species
- Podocarpus nivalis, a conifer species
- Primula nivalis, a herb species
- Pyrus nivalis, a pear species
