= Acianthera cachensis =

Scientific classification
- Kingdom: Plantae
- Clade: Tracheophytes
- Clade: Angiosperms
- Clade: Monocots
- Order: Asparagales
- Family: Orchidaceae
- Subfamily: Epidendroideae
- Genus: Acianthera
- Species: A. cachensis

Binomial name
- Acianthera cachensis (Ames) Karremans

Species of orchid

Acianthera cachensis is a species of orchid native to Costa Rica. It was first formally named Pleurothallis cachensis in 1923 and transferred to the genus Acianthera in 2016.
