= Pleurothallis franciana =

Scientific classification
- Kingdom: Plantae
- Clade: Embryophytes
- Clade: Tracheophytes
- Clade: Angiosperms
- Clade: Monocots
- Order: Asparagales
- Family: Orchidaceae
- Subfamily: Epidendroideae
- Genus: Pleurothallis
- Species: P. franciana

Binomial name
- Pleurothallis franciana Sierra-Ariza

Species of flowering plant

Pleurothallis franciana is a species of flowering plant in the family Orchidaceae. It is an epiphyte with leathery leaves and reddish-purple flowers. The species is native to Colombia, and was described in 2023.

== Taxonomy ==
Pleurothallis franciana was described by Mario Alexei Sierra-Ariza in 2023. The holotype was collected in 2022, in Ibagué, Tolima, at en elevation of 1,976 metres (6,483 ft).

Pleurothallis franciana is part of the subsection Macrophyllae-Fasciculatae.

== Distribution ==
Pleurothallis franciana is native to the wet tropical biome of Colombia. It was discovered in wet premonate forest, in the Central Cordillera, Tolima.

== Description ==
Pleurothallis franciana is an epiphyte. It grows 4–12 centimetres (1.6–4.7 in) high. The stems are green, 3.5–11 centimetres (1.4–4.3 in) long, and have papery, light brown sheaths. The roots are slender, and around 1 millimetre (0.039 in) high. The leaves are light green, leathery, ovate to ovate-lanceolate, 3–5 centimetres (1.2–2.0 in) long, and 2.4–3.5 centimetres (0.94–1.38 in) wide.

The inflorescence is a fascicle that grows on a 2.0–3.8 millimetres (0.079–0.150 in) stem. The flowers have stems around 3.2 millimetres (0.13 in) long. The dorsal sepal is reddish-purple, with slightly yellow edges, narrowly ovate-lanceolate, 3.9–4.4 millimetres (0.15–0.17 in) long, and 1.5–1.9 millimetres (0.059–0.075 in). The lateral sepals are yellow, with reddish-purple spots, and fused into an ovate synsepal. The synsepal is 4.2–4.5 millimetres (0.17–0.18 in) long, and 2.4–2.7 millimetres (0.094–0.106 in) wide. The petals are reddish-purple, fleshy, 2.3–2.6 millimetres (0.091–0.102 in) long, and 0.3–0.4 millimetres (0.012–0.016 in) wide. The lip is reddish-purple, fleshy, oblong-lanceolate, 2.2–2.5 millimetres (0.087–0.098 in) long, and 1.2–1.4 millimetres (0.047–0.055 in) wide. The column is reddish-purple. Flowering has been observed in July.

Pleurothallis franciana is similar to Pleurothallis ariana-dayanae, Pleurothallis scabrilinguis, and Pleurothallis applanata.

== Etymology ==
Pleurothallis franciana is named for Francia Márquez, the former vice-president of Colombia.
