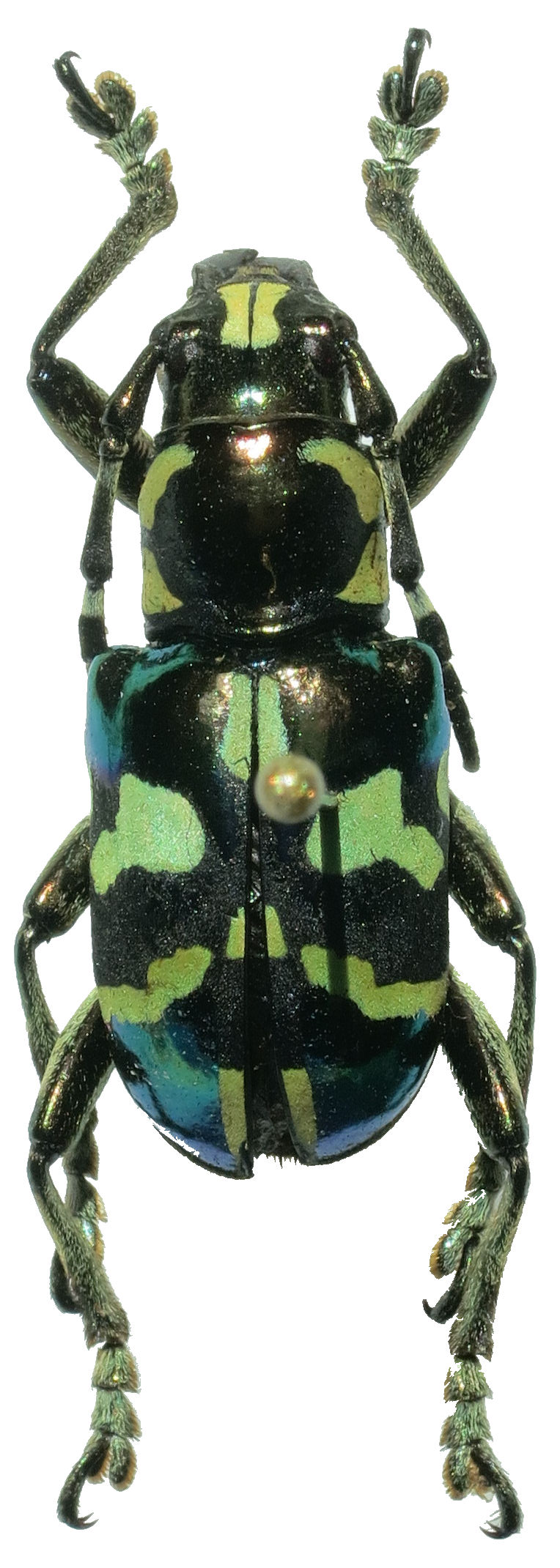
- M. alboplagiata from Philippines

Scientific classification
- Kingdom: Animalia
- Phylum: Arthropoda
- Class: Insecta
- Order: Coleoptera
- Suborder: Polyphaga
- Infraorder: Cucujiformia
- Family: Cerambycidae
- Genus: Mimacronia
- Species: M. alboplagiata

Binomial name
- Mimacronia alboplagiata (Schultze, 1922)

Synonyms
- Acronia? alboplagiata Schultze, 1922

= Mimacronia alboplagiata =

Species of beetle

Mimacronia alboplagiata is a species of beetle in the family Cerambycidae. It was described by Schultze in 1922, originally under the genus Acronia. It is known from the Philippines.
