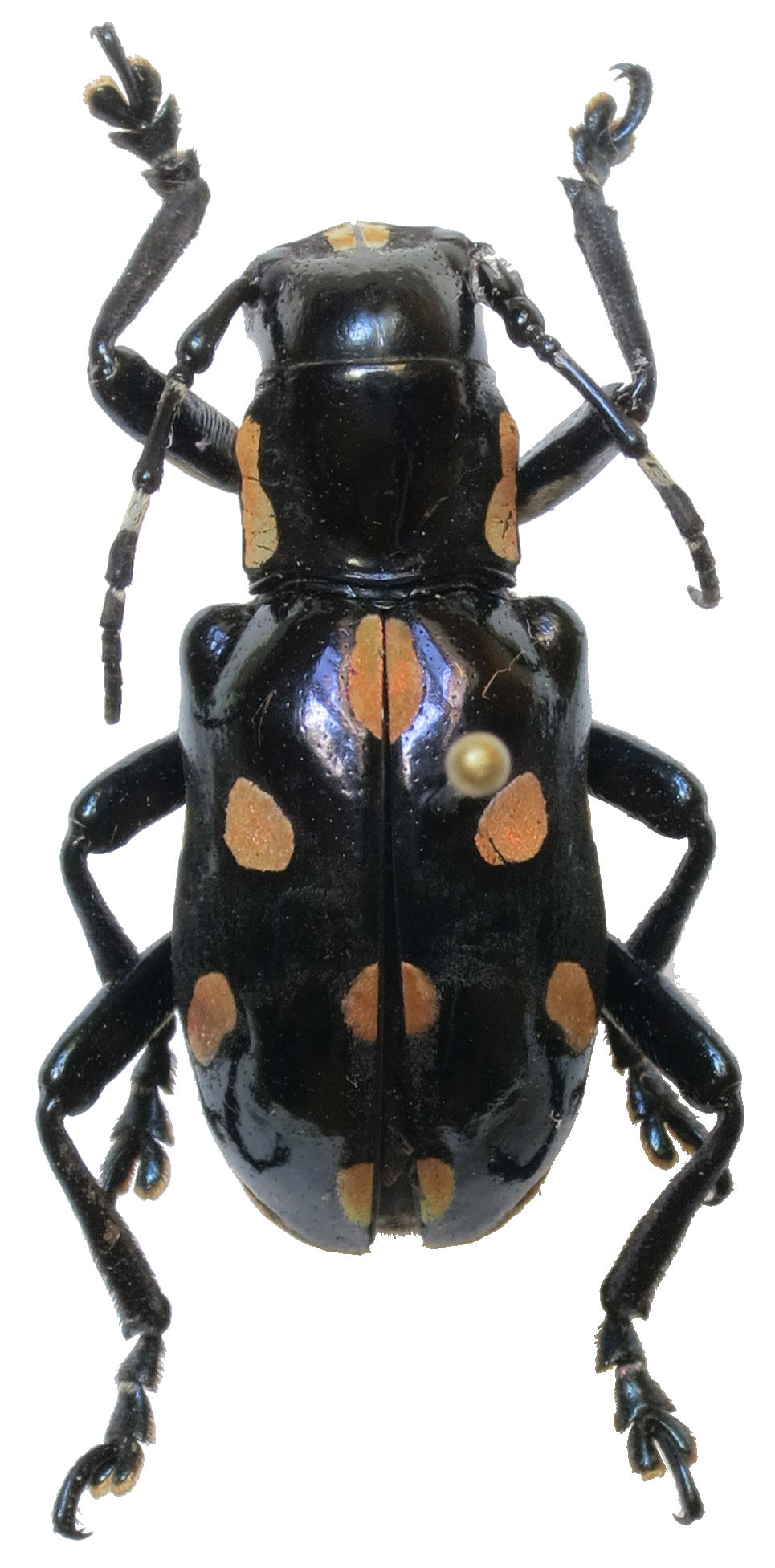
- female - Lope de Vega, Philippines

Scientific classification
- Kingdom: Animalia
- Phylum: Arthropoda
- Class: Insecta
- Order: Coleoptera
- Suborder: Polyphaga
- Infraorder: Cucujiformia
- Family: Cerambycidae
- Genus: Mimacronia
- Species: M. viridimaculata

Binomial name
- Mimacronia viridimaculata (Breuning, 1947)

Synonyms
- Mimacronia novemmaculata (Hüdepohl, 1995); Acronia alboplagiata var. viridimaculata Breuning, 1947; Acronia novemmaculata Hüdepohl, 1995

= Mimacronia viridimaculata =

Species of beetle

Mimacronia viridimaculata is a species of beetle in the family Cerambycidae. It was described by Stephan von Breuning in 1947, originally under the genus Acronia. It is known from the Philippines.
