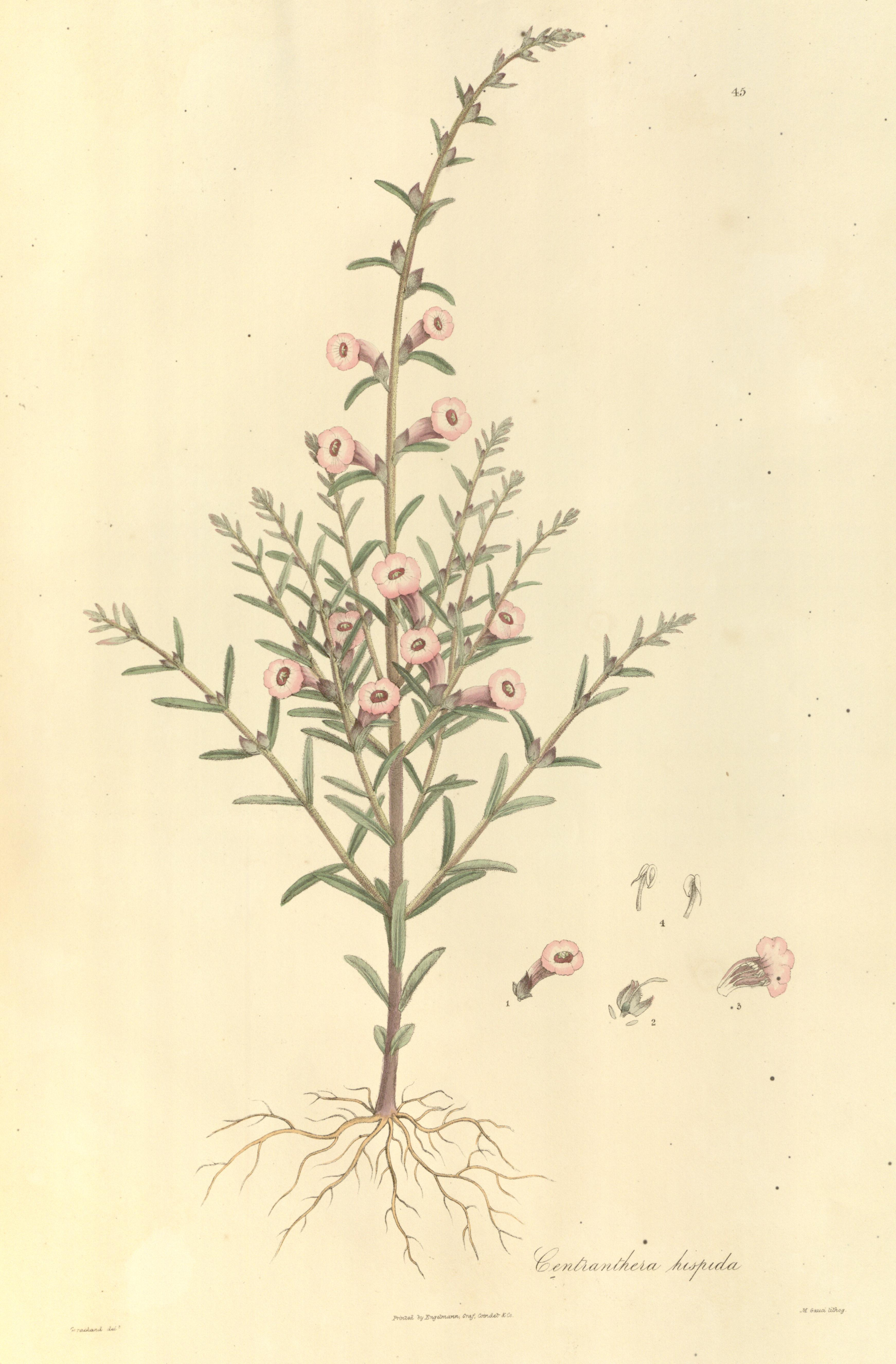
- Centranthera hispida

Scientific classification
- Kingdom: Plantae
- Clade: Tracheophytes
- Clade: Angiosperms
- Clade: Eudicots
- Clade: Asterids
- Order: Lamiales
- Family: Orobanchaceae
- Tribe: Buchnereae
- Genus: Centranthera; R.Br. 1810

= Centranthera =

Genus of flowering plants in the broomrape family

Centranthera is a genus of plants in the family Orobanchaceae. The genus is distributed in Asia. There are about 10 species in this genus, and the majority have funnel-shaped flowers. In Nepal, Centranthera cochinchinensis is reportedly used an alternate fodder.

== Species ==
Species accepted by the Plants of the World Online as of November 2022:

- Centranthera brunoniana Wall. ex Benth.
- Centranthera chevalieri Bonati
- Centranthera cochinchinensis (Lour.) Merr.
- Centranthera grandiflora Benth.
- Centranthera hispida R.Br.
- Centranthera hookeri (Merr.) Merr.
- Centranthera indica (L.) Gamble
- Centranthera nepalensis D.Don
- Centranthera rubra H.L.Li
- Centranthera siamensis T.Yamaz.
- Centranthera tranquebarica (Biehler) Merr.

== Other uses ==
The name Centranthera Scheidw. 1842 is an invalid name for the orchid genus Pleurothallis.
