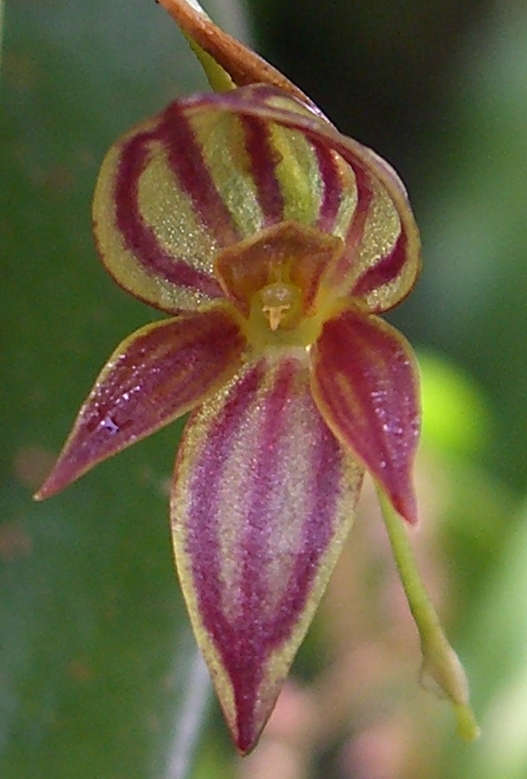
- Flower of Pleurothallis lamellaris

Scientific classification
- Kingdom: Plantae
- Clade: Embryophytes
- Clade: Tracheophytes
- Clade: Spermatophytes
- Clade: Angiosperms
- Clade: Monocots
- Order: Asparagales
- Family: Orchidaceae
- Subfamily: Epidendroideae
- Genus: Pleurothallis
- Species: P. lamellaris

Binomial name
- Pleurothallis lamellaris Lindl.

Synonyms
- Humboldtia lamellaris (Lindl.) Kuntze; Pleurothallis loxensis Luer & Hirtz

= Pleurothallis lamellaris =

Species of orchid

Pleurothallis lamellaris is a species of orchid found from central Colombia to Bolivia.
