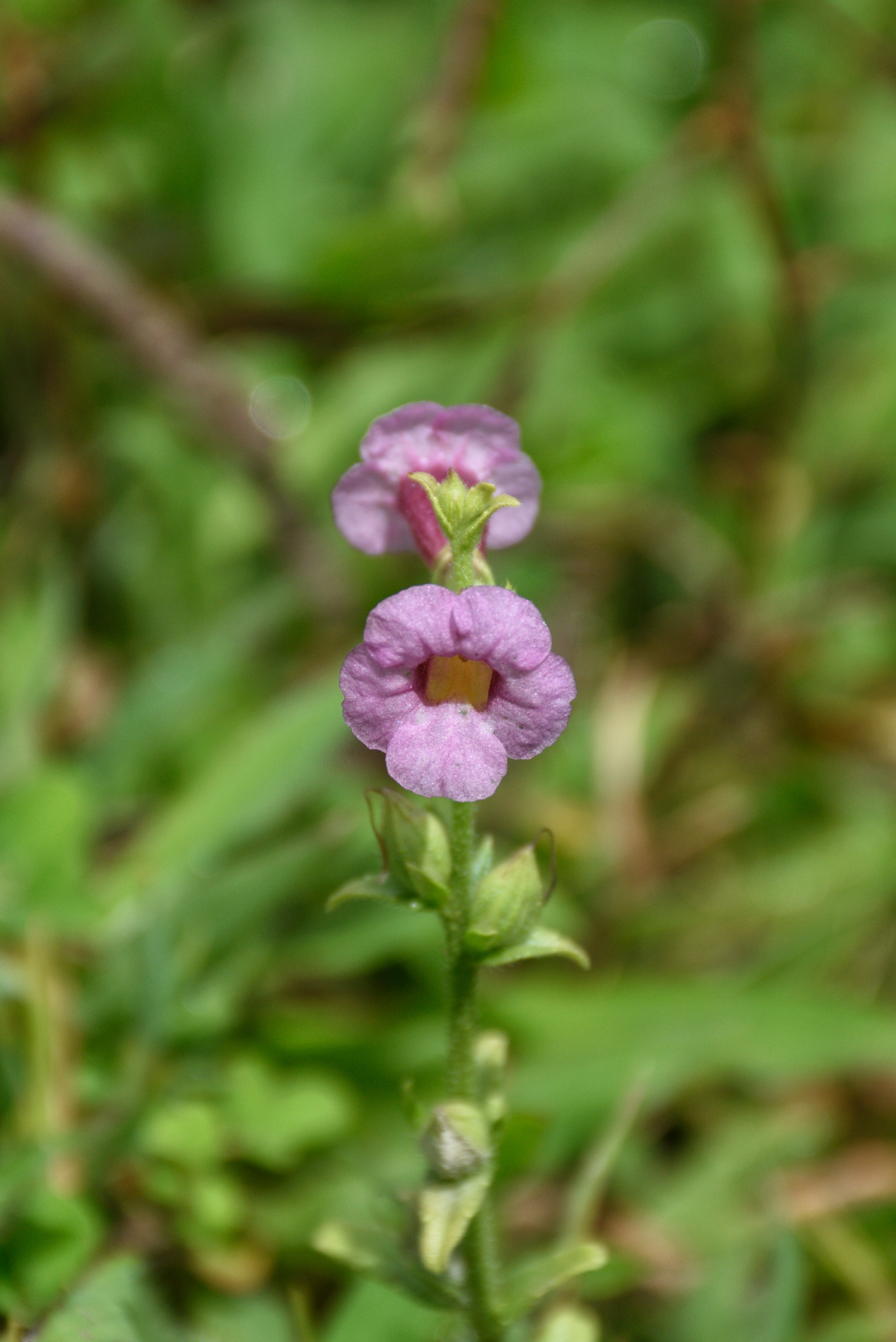

Scientific classification
- Kingdom: Plantae
- Clade: Tracheophytes
- Clade: Angiosperms
- Clade: Eudicots
- Clade: Asterids
- Order: Lamiales
- Family: Orobanchaceae
- Genus: Centranthera
- Species: C. nepalensis

Binomial name
- Centranthera nepalensis D.Don

= Centranthera nepalensis =

Nepal spur-anther flower

Species of plant

Centranthera nepalensis, the Nepal spur-anther flower is a hemiparasitic plant in the family Orobanchaceae. It is endemic to South India.

== Description ==
It is an erect densely hispid herbaceous plant growing up to 1–2 ft tall, with purplish red or nearly white funnel shaped flowers. Leaves are opposite or rarely alternate, sub-sessile and linear-lance shaped. The flowering season is from September to December.
