= Pleurothallis calamifolia =

Scientific classification
- Kingdom: Plantae
- Clade: Tracheophytes
- Clade: Angiosperms
- Clade: Monocots
- Order: Asparagales
- Family: Orchidaceae
- Subfamily: Epidendroideae
- Genus: Pleurothallis
- Species: P. calamifolia

Binomial name
- Pleurothallis calamifolia Luer & R.Escobar

Species of orchid

Pleurothallis calamifolia is a species of orchid native to Colombia and Venezuela. It was named in 1996 and the holotype is from cloud forest in Colombia.
