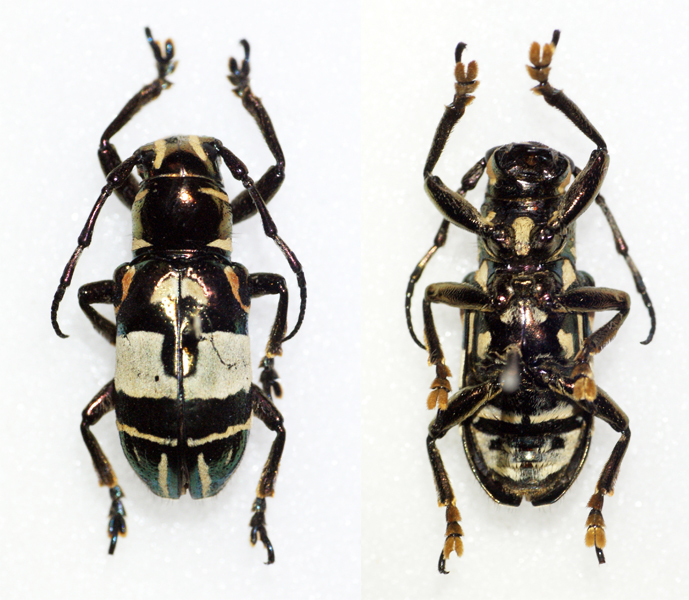

Scientific classification
- Domain: Eukaryota
- Kingdom: Animalia
- Phylum: Arthropoda
- Class: Insecta
- Order: Coleoptera
- Suborder: Polyphaga
- Infraorder: Cucujiformia
- Family: Cerambycidae
- Tribe: Pteropliini
- Genus: Mimacronia
- Species: M. dinagatensis

Binomial name
- Mimacronia dinagatensis (Hüdepohl, 1995)

Synonyms
- Mimacronia dignatensis (Hüdepohl) Vives, 2009 (misspelling); Acronia dinagatensis Hüdepohl, 1995

= Mimacronia dinagatensis =

Species of beetle

Mimacronia dinagatensis is a species of beetle in the family Cerambycidae. It was described by Karl-Ernst Hüdepohl in 1995. It is known from the Philippines.
