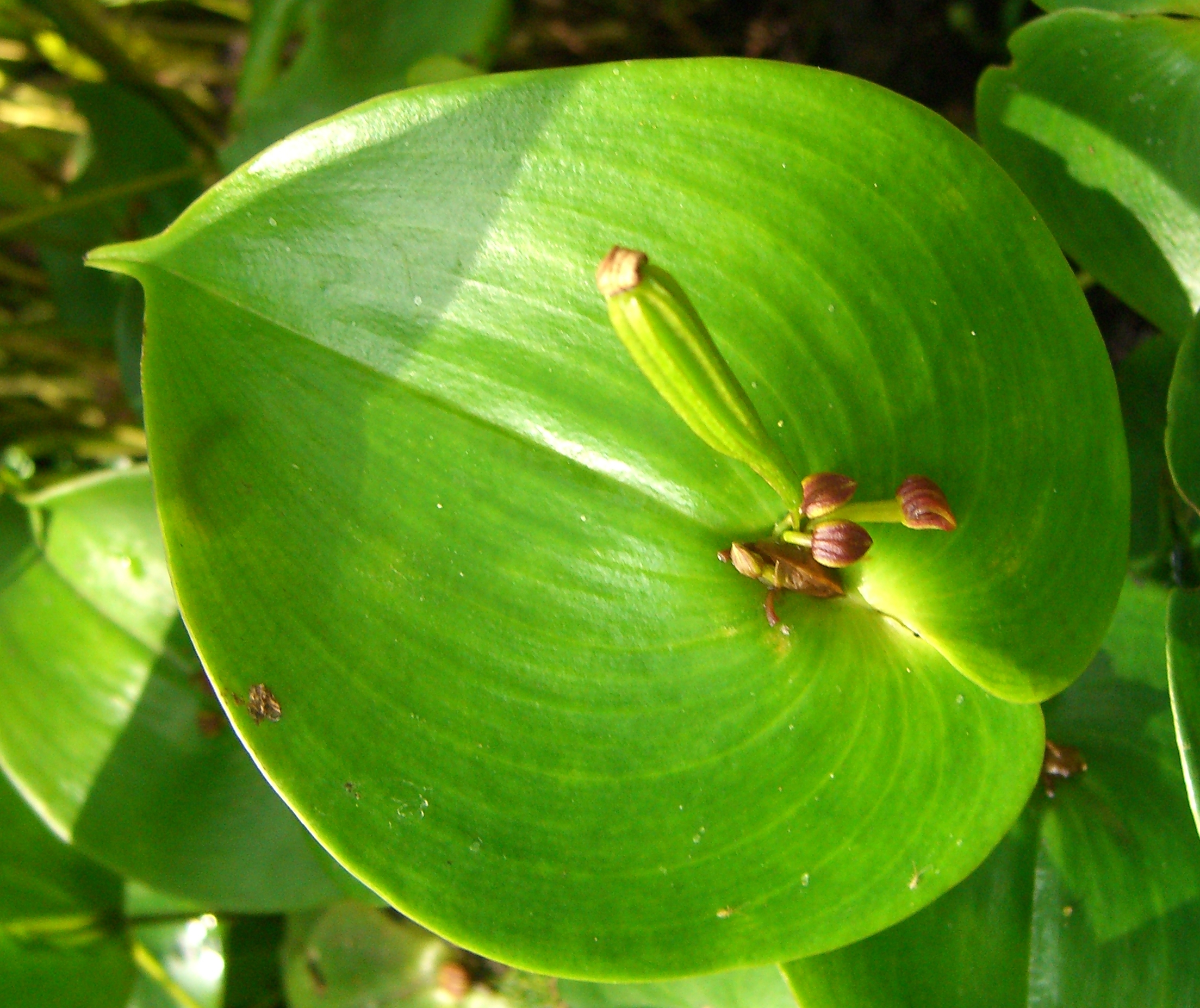

Scientific classification
- Kingdom: Plantae
- Clade: Embryophytes
- Clade: Tracheophytes
- Clade: Spermatophytes
- Clade: Angiosperms
- Clade: Monocots
- Order: Asparagales
- Family: Orchidaceae
- Subfamily: Epidendroideae
- Genus: Pleurothallis
- Species: P. cordata

Binomial name
- Pleurothallis cordata (Ruiz & Pav.) Lindl.

Synonyms
- Humboldtia cordata Ruiz & Pav. (basionym); Stelis cordata (Ruiz & Pav.) Willd.; Pleurothallis monocardia Rchb.f.; Humboldtia monocardia (Rchb.f.) Kuntze; Pleurothallis cardiophylla Schltr.; Pleurothallis rhopalocarpa Schltr.; Pleurothallis cordifolia var. rhopalocarpa (Schltr.) T.Hashim.; Zosterophyllanthos monocardius (Rchb.f.) Szlach. & Marg.; Acronia cordata (Ruiz & Pav.) Luer; Acronia coa subsp. rhopalocarpa (Schltr.) Luer; Zosterophyllanthos rhopalocarpus (Schltr.) Szlach. & Kulak

= Pleurothallis cordata =

Species of orchid

Pleurothallis cordata is a species of orchid in the family Orchidaceae. It grows from western South America to Venezuela.
