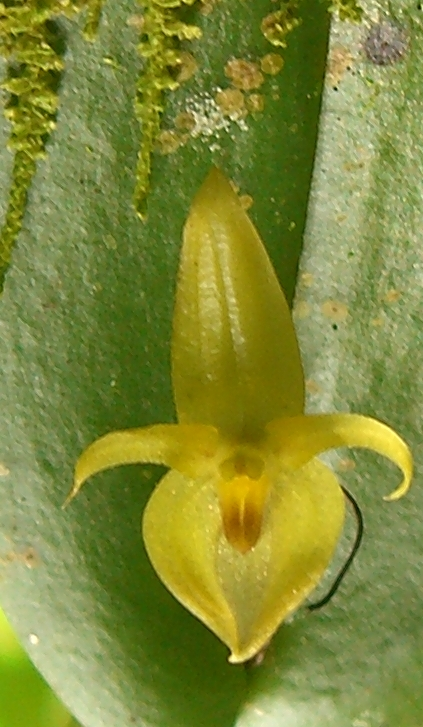
- Flower of Pleurothallis phyllocardioides

Scientific classification
- Kingdom: Plantae
- Clade: Embryophytes
- Clade: Tracheophytes
- Clade: Spermatophytes
- Clade: Angiosperms
- Clade: Monocots
- Order: Asparagales
- Family: Orchidaceae
- Subfamily: Epidendroideae
- Genus: Pleurothallis
- Species: P. phyllocardioides

Binomial name
- Pleurothallis phyllocardioides Schltr.

Synonyms
- Pleurothallis acostaei Schltr.; Pleurothallis rhaphidopus Schltr.; Pleurothallis graciliscapa C.Schweinf.; Zosterophyllanthos phyllocardioides (Schltr.) Szlach. & Marg.; Acronia phyllocardioides (Schltr.) Luer

= Pleurothallis phyllocardioides =

Species of orchid

Pleurothallis phyllocardioides is a species of orchid occurring from Central America to Bolivia.

- Media related to Pleurothallis phyllocardioides at Wikimedia Commons
- Data related to Pleurothallis phyllocardioides at Wikispecies
