= Pleurothallis ascera =

Scientific classification
- Kingdom: Plantae
- Clade: Tracheophytes
- Clade: Angiosperms
- Clade: Monocots
- Order: Asparagales
- Family: Orchidaceae
- Subfamily: Epidendroideae
- Genus: Pleurothallis
- Species: P. ascera

Binomial name
- Pleurothallis ascera Carlyle A. Luer; Rodrigo Escobar

Species of plant

Pleurothallis ascera is a species of plant in the family Orchidaceae.

== Distribution ==
It is native to Colombia. It is found in the Andes around 1800 meters.

== Description ==
It is an epiphyte with stout, erect ramicauls enveloped tubular sheaths, and flower size of 2.5 centimeters.

== Taxonomy ==
It was named by Carlyle A. Luer and Rodrigo Escobar in: Orquideologia 20: 36. in 1996.
