= Pleurothallis arctata =

Scientific classification
- Kingdom: Plantae
- Clade: Tracheophytes
- Clade: Angiosperms
- Clade: Monocots
- Order: Asparagales
- Family: Orchidaceae
- Subfamily: Epidendroideae
- Genus: Pleurothallis
- Species: P. arctata

Binomial name
- Pleurothallis arctata Carlyle A. Luer

Species of plant

Pleurothallis arctata is a plant species in the family Orchidaceae.

== Distribution ==
It is native to Peru. It is found in the Andes around 2200 meters.

== Taxonomy ==
It was named by Carlyle A. Luer in Lindleyana 12: 39 in 1997.
