= Mimacronia arnaudi =

Scientific classification
- Domain: Eukaryota
- Kingdom: Animalia
- Phylum: Arthropoda
- Class: Insecta
- Order: Coleoptera
- Suborder: Polyphaga
- Infraorder: Cucujiformia
- Family: Cerambycidae
- Tribe: Pteropliini
- Genus: Mimacronia
- Species: M. arnaudi

Binomial name
- Mimacronia arnaudi (Hüdepohl, 1983)

Synonyms
- Acronia arnaudi Hüdepohl, 1983

Species of beetle

Mimacronia arnaudi is a species of beetle in the family Cerambycidae. It was described by Karl-Ernst Hüdepohl in 1983. It is endemic to the Philippines.
