= Mimacronia viridimaculatoides =

Scientific classification
- Kingdom: Animalia
- Phylum: Arthropoda
- Class: Insecta
- Order: Coleoptera
- Suborder: Polyphaga
- Infraorder: Cucujiformia
- Family: Cerambycidae
- Genus: Mimacronia
- Species: M. viridimaculatoides

Binomial name
- Mimacronia viridimaculatoides (Breuning, 1980)

Synonyms
- Acronia viridimaculatoides Breuning, 1980

Species of beetle

Mimacronia viridimaculatoides is a species of beetle in the family Cerambycidae. It was described by Stephan von Breuning in 1980. It is known from the Philippines.
