= Pleurothallis cajamarcae =

Scientific classification
- Kingdom: Plantae
- Clade: Tracheophytes
- Clade: Angiosperms
- Clade: Monocots
- Order: Asparagales
- Family: Orchidaceae
- Subfamily: Epidendroideae
- Genus: Pleurothallis
- Species: P. cajamarcae

Binomial name
- Pleurothallis cajamarcae Schltr.

Species of orchid

Pleurothallis cajamarcae is a species of orchid endemic to Peru. It was named in 1921.
