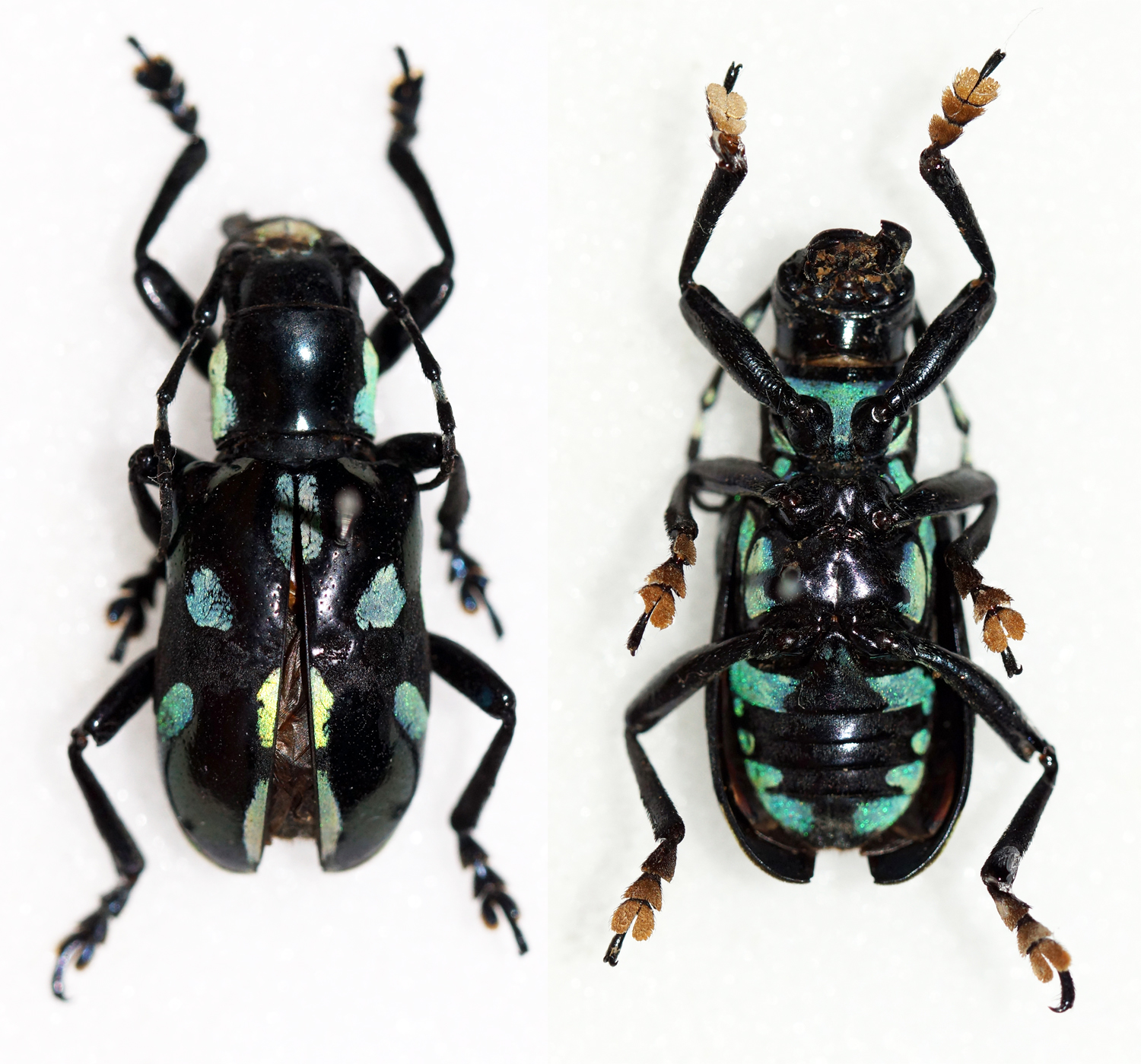
- Mimacronia novemmaculata

Scientific classification
- Domain: Eukaryota
- Kingdom: Animalia
- Phylum: Arthropoda
- Class: Insecta
- Order: Coleoptera
- Suborder: Polyphaga
- Infraorder: Cucujiformia
- Family: Cerambycidae
- Tribe: Pteropliini
- Genus: Mimacronia

= Mimacronia =

Genus of beetles

Mimacronia is a genus of longhorn beetles of the subfamily Lamiinae, containing the following species:

- Mimacronia alboplagiata (Schultze, 1922)
- Mimacronia arnaudi (Hüdepohl, 1983)
- Mimacronia decimaculata (Schultze, 1919)
- Mimacronia dinagatensis (Hüdepohl, 1995)
- Mimacronia novemmaculata (Hüdepohl, 1995)
- Mimacronia viridimaculatoides (Breuning, 1980)
- Mimacronia regale Barševskis, 2015
- Mimacronia viridimaculata (Breuning, 1947)
