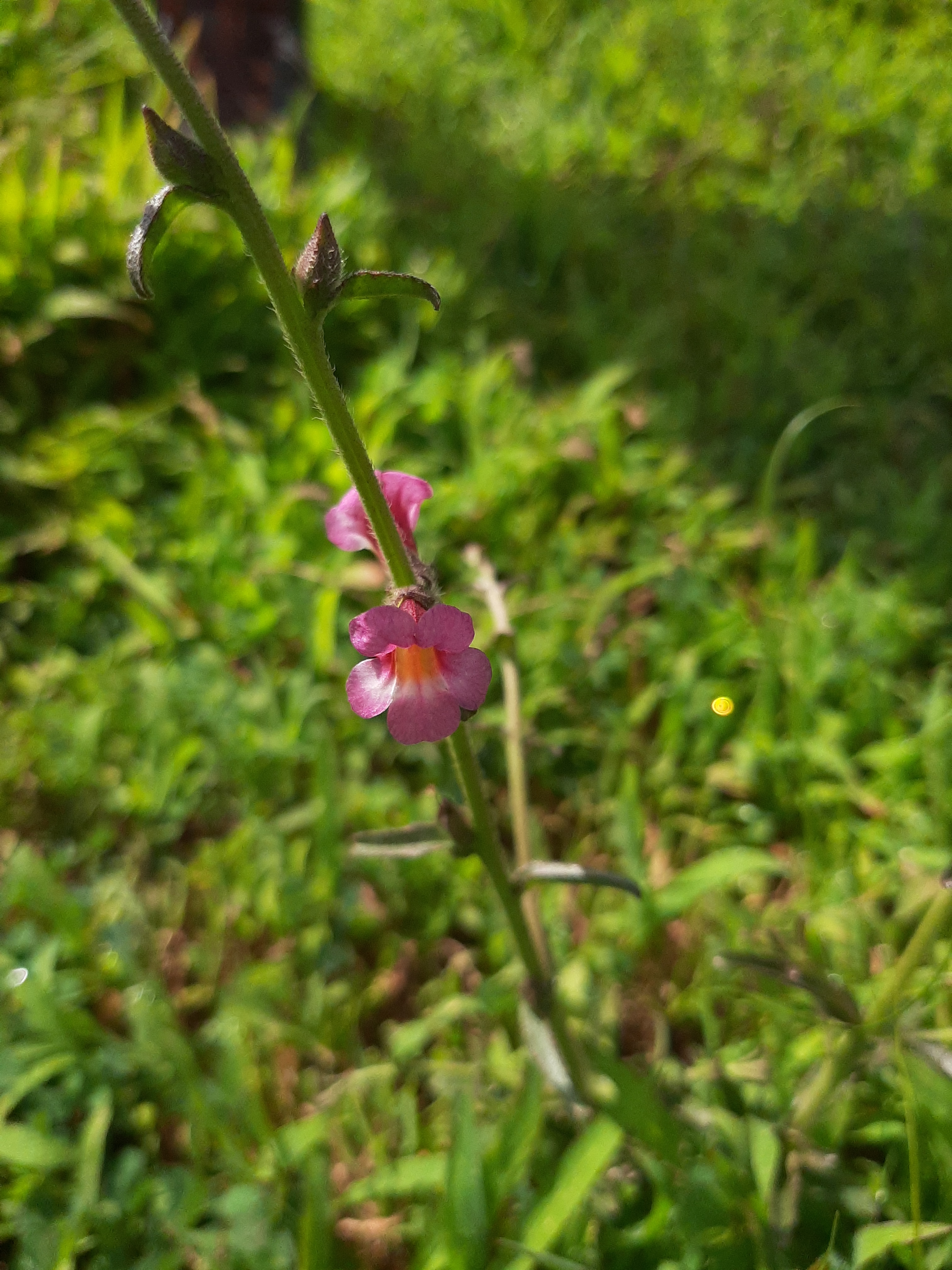

Conservation status
- Least Concern (IUCN 3.1)

Scientific classification
- Kingdom: Plantae
- Clade: Tracheophytes
- Clade: Angiosperms
- Clade: Eudicots
- Clade: Asterids
- Order: Lamiales
- Family: Orobanchaceae
- Genus: Centranthera
- Species: C. indica

Binomial name
- Centranthera indica (L.) Gamble

Synonyms
- Razumovia indica (L.) Alston; Rhinanthus indicus L.; Centranthera procumbens Benth.; Purshia ciliata Dennst.; Digitalis stricta Roxb.; Capraria rigida Buch.-Ham. ex Hook.f.

= Centranthera indica =

Species of flowering plant

Centranthera indica, or Indian spur-anther flower, is an annual herb belonging to the family Orobanchaceae. It is distributed along the Indomalayan realm, China and Australia. Growing erect up to 10–50 cm, this plant is seen in open grasslands and moist deciduous to evergreen forests of the Western Ghats.

== Description ==
Sessile hairy leaves are basally opposite and upper ones are alternate. Flowers are solitary, axillary and rose or white colored corolla is tubular, incurved and dilated above with 5 lobes. There are 4 stamens, Ovary globose and style simple. Fruit is 4-7 x 3–5 mm dark brown capsule, ovoid, covered by persistent calyx lobes. Seeds are 1 mm long, oblong-cuneate and striate. Flowering and fruiting season is September to January.
