= Pleurothallis microcardia =

Scientific classification
- Kingdom: Plantae
- Clade: Tracheophytes
- Clade: Angiosperms
- Clade: Monocots
- Order: Asparagales
- Family: Orchidaceae
- Subfamily: Epidendroideae
- Genus: Pleurothallis
- Species: P. microcardia

Binomial name
- Pleurothallis microcardia Schltr.

Synonyms
- Acronia microcardia (Rchb.f.) Luer; Pleurothallis chachatoynsis Schltr.; Pleurothallis cundinamarcae Schltr.; Pleurothallis stenosepala Rolfe; Zosterophyllanthos microcardia (Rchb.f.) Szlach. & Kolan.

Species of orchid

Pleurothallis microcardia is a species of orchid plant native to Bolivia, Colombia, Ecuador, Peru.
