= Pleurothallis adelphe =

Scientific classification
- Kingdom: Plantae
- Clade: Tracheophytes
- Clade: Angiosperms
- Clade: Monocots
- Order: Asparagales
- Family: Orchidaceae
- Subfamily: Epidendroideae
- Genus: Pleurothallis
- Species: P. adelphe

Binomial name
- Pleurothallis adelphe Luer & Hirtz

Synonyms
- Pleurothallis perforata Luer & Hirtz

Species of plant

Pleurothallis adelphe is a species of orchid plant native to Ecuador.
