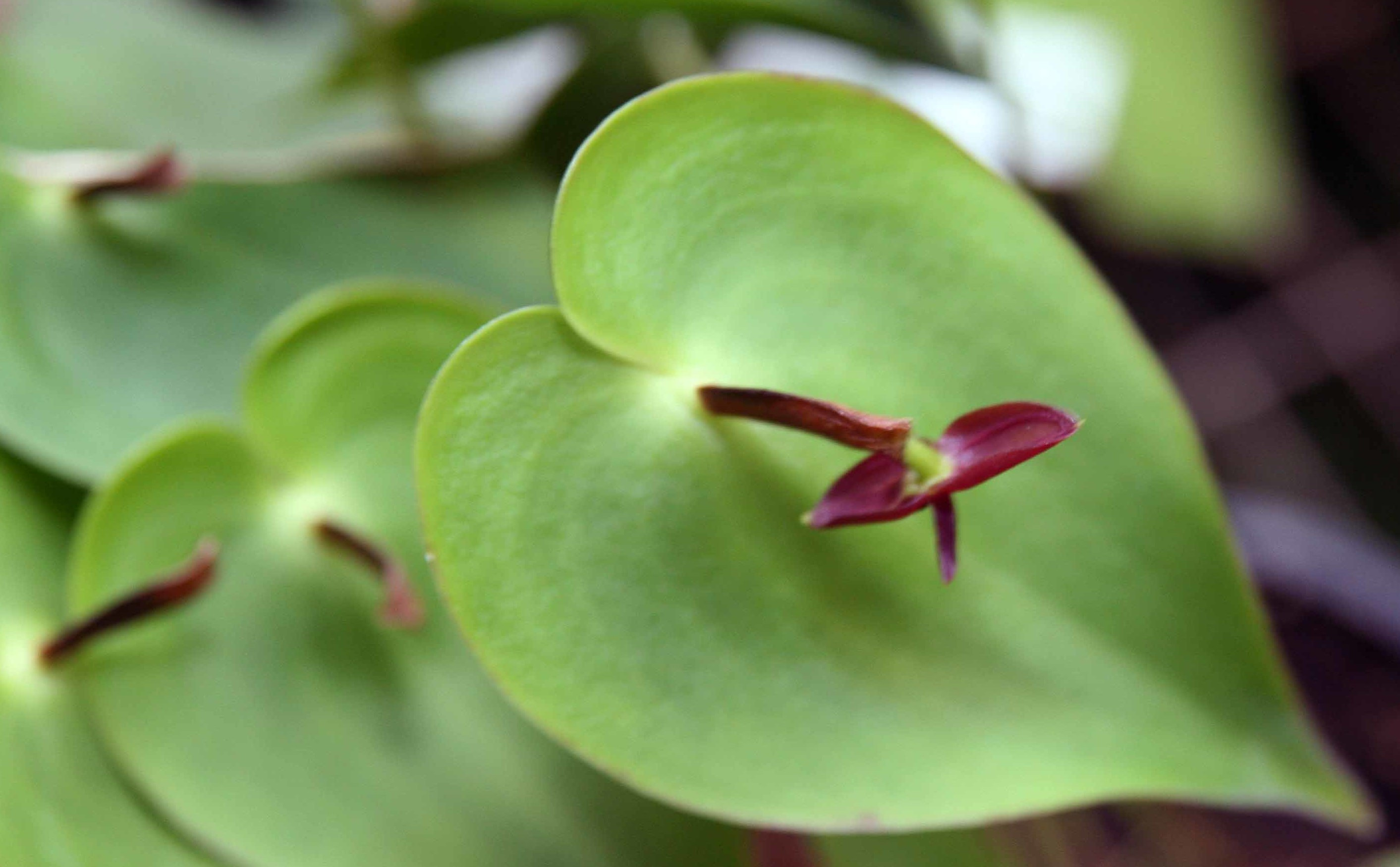

Scientific classification
- Kingdom: Plantae
- Clade: Tracheophytes
- Clade: Angiosperms
- Clade: Monocots
- Order: Asparagales
- Family: Orchidaceae
- Subfamily: Epidendroideae
- Genus: Pleurothallis
- Species: P. bivalvis

Binomial name
- Pleurothallis bivalvis Lindl.

Synonyms
- Acronia archidiaconi (Ames) Carnevali & G.A.Romero; Acronia bivalvis (Lindl.) Luer; Humboltia bivalvis (Lindl.) Kuntze; Humboltia cardium (Rchb.f.) Kuntze; Pleurothallis angusta Ames & C.Schweinf.; Pleurothallis antonensis L.O.Williams; Pleurothallis archidiaconi Ames; Pleurothallis cardiantha Rchb.f.; Pleurothallis cardium Rchb.f.; Pleurothallis chanchamayoensis Schltr.; Pleurothallis fuscata Braid; Pleurothallis harlingii Garay; Pleurothallis ignivomi Schltr.; Pleurothallis lansbergiana Regel; Pleurothallis lansbergii Regel; Pleurothallis lilianiae Luer; Pleurothallis phaeantha Schltr.; Pleurothallis pichinchae Schltr.; Pleurothallis sigsigensis Schltr.; Pleurothallis stenocardium Schltr.; Zosterophyllanthos antonensis (L.O.Williams) Szlach. & Archila; Zosterophyllanthos archidiaconi (Ames) Veyret & Szlach.; Zosterophyllanthos bivalvis (Lindl.) Szlach.; Zosterophyllanthos ignivomi (Schltr.) Szlach. & Marg.; Zosterophyllanthos lilianiae (Luer) Szlach. & Kulak

= Pleurothallis bivalvis =

Species of orchid

Pleurothallis bivalvis is a species of orchid plant native to Bolivia, Colombia, Costa Rica, Ecuador, French Guiana, Guyana, Mexico, Panama, Peru, Suriname, Trinidad-Tobago, and Venezuela.
