= Pleurothallis oxapampae =

Scientific classification
- Kingdom: Plantae
- Clade: Tracheophytes
- Clade: Angiosperms
- Clade: Monocots
- Order: Asparagales
- Family: Orchidaceae
- Subfamily: Epidendroideae
- Genus: Pleurothallis
- Species: P. oxapampae

Binomial name
- Pleurothallis oxapampae Luer

Species of orchid

Pleurothallis oxapampae is a species of orchid from Peru first described by Carlyle A. Luer in 1982.
