= Pleurothallis applanata =

Scientific classification
- Kingdom: Plantae
- Clade: Tracheophytes
- Clade: Angiosperms
- Clade: Monocots
- Order: Asparagales
- Family: Orchidaceae
- Subfamily: Epidendroideae
- Genus: Pleurothallis
- Species: P. applanata

Binomial name
- Pleurothallis applanata Luer & Dalström 1996

Species of plant

Pleurothallis applanata is a species of flowering plant in the family Orchidaceae.

== Distribution ==
It is native to Ecuador.

It is an epiphyte, found at elevations of 800 to 1800 meters.

== Taxonomy ==
It was named by Carlyle A. Luer and Stig Dalström, in Lindleyana 11: 147, in 1996.
