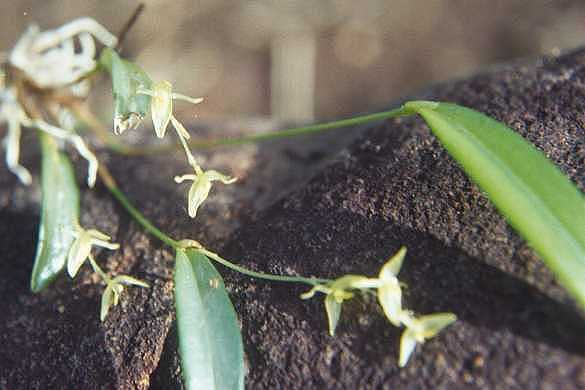
- Leaves of the pleurothallis pruinosa plant

Scientific classification
- Kingdom: Plantae
- Clade: Tracheophytes
- Clade: Angiosperms
- Clade: Monocots
- Order: Asparagales
- Family: Orchidaceae
- Subfamily: Epidendroideae
- Genus: Pleurothallis
- Species: P. pruinosa

Binomial name
- Pleurothallis pruinosa Lindl.

Synonyms
- Pleurothallis brachyglottis Rchb.f.

= Pleurothallis pruinosa =

Species of plant

Pleurothallis pruinosa is a species of orchid plant native to Central and South America.
