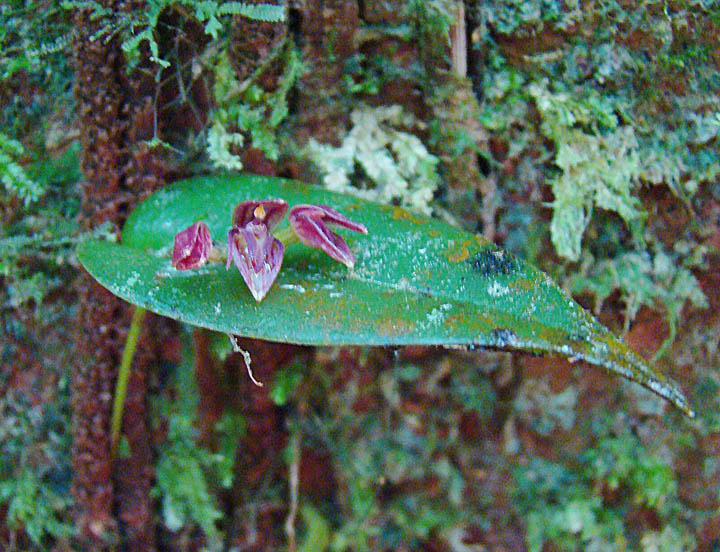

Scientific classification
- Kingdom: Plantae
- Clade: Tracheophytes
- Clade: Angiosperms
- Clade: Monocots
- Order: Asparagales
- Family: Orchidaceae
- Subfamily: Epidendroideae
- Genus: Pleurothallis
- Species: P. cardiothallis

Binomial name
- Pleurothallis cardiothallis Rchb.f

= Pleurothallis cardiothallis =

Species of orchid

Pleurothallis cardiothallis is a species of orchid plant native to Central America.
