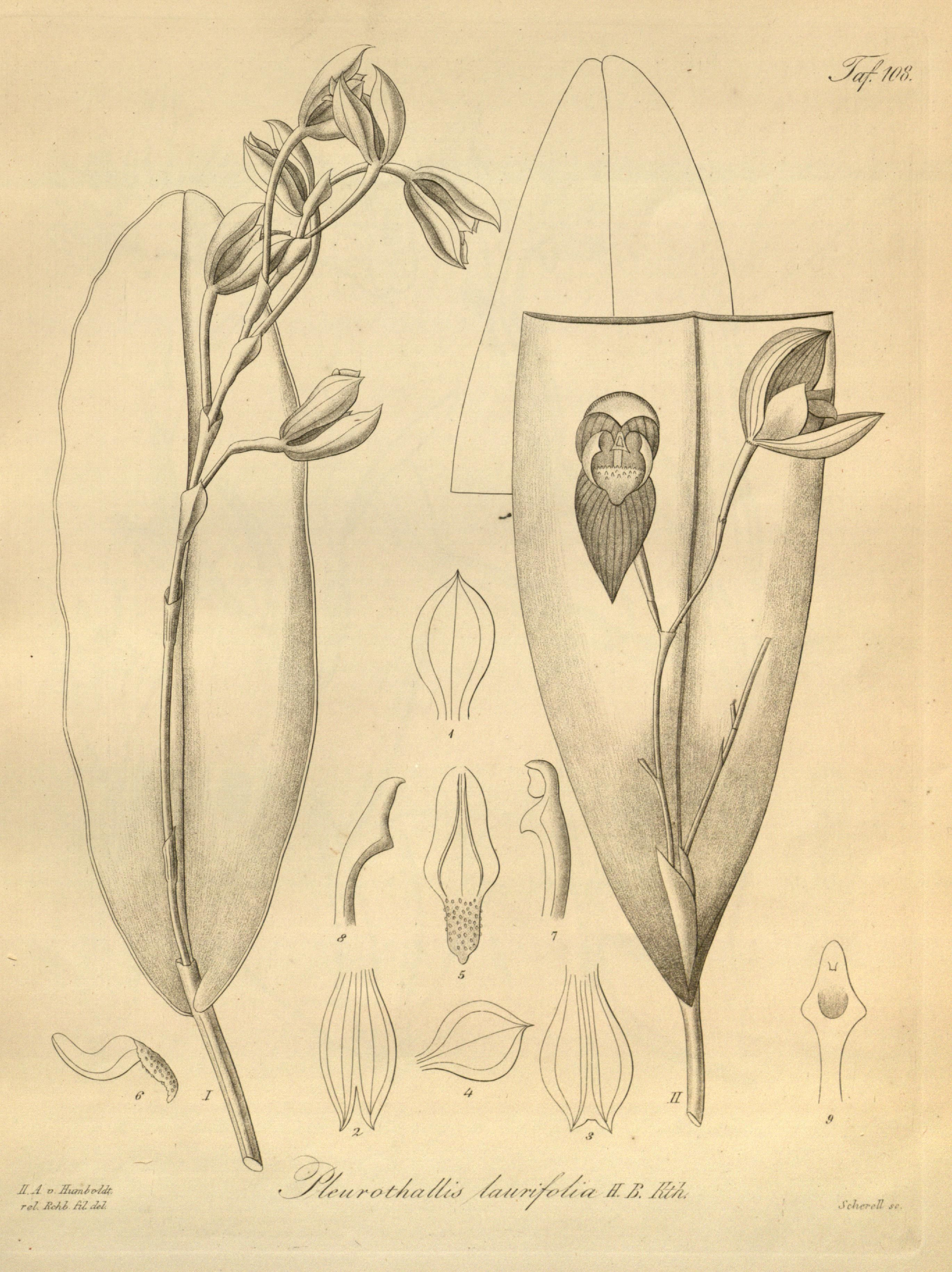

Scientific classification
- Kingdom: Plantae
- Clade: Tracheophytes
- Clade: Angiosperms
- Clade: Monocots
- Order: Asparagales
- Family: Orchidaceae
- Subfamily: Epidendroideae
- Genus: Pleurothallis
- Species: P. ruscifolia

Binomial name
- Pleurothallis ruscifolia (Jacq.) R.Br.

Synonyms
- Dendrobium ruscifolium (Jacq.) Sw.; Epidendrum ruscifolium Jacq.; Humboltia laurifolia (Kunth) Kuntze; Humboltia ruscifolia (Jacq.) Kuntze; Humboltia succosa Pav. ex Lindl.; Pleurothallis glomerata Ames; Pleurothallis laurifolia Kunth; Pleurothallis multicaulis Poepp. & Endl.; Pleurothallis ruscifolia var. caquetana Schltr.; Pleurothallis succosa Lindl.

= Pleurothallis ruscifolia =

Species of plant

Pleurothallis ruscifolia is a species of orchid plant native to 600 – 2400 m.; Andes Mountains in South America, and Central America.
