= Pleurothallis =

- Pleurothallis epiglottis

Scientific classification
- Kingdom: Plantae
- Clade: Tracheophytes
- Clade: Angiosperms
- Clade: Monocots
- Order: Asparagales
- Family: Orchidaceae
- Subfamily: Epidendroideae
- Tribe: Epidendreae
- Subtribe: Pleurothallidinae
- Genus: Pleurothallis; R.Br., 1813

Synonyms
- Acronia C.Presl; Ancipitia (Luer) Luer; Atopoglossum Luer; Centranthera Scheidw.; Colombiana Ospina; Lalexia Luer; Lindleyalis Luer; Loddigesia Luer; Mirandopsis Szlach. & Marg.; Mixis Luer; Orbis Luer; Pleurobotryum Barb.Rodr.; Proctoria Luer; Rhynchopera Klotzsch; Talpinaria H.Karst.; Tigivesta Luer; Vestigium Luer; Zosterophyllanthos Szlach. & Marg.

Genus of orchids

Pleurothallis is a genus of orchids commonly called bonnet orchids. The genus name is derived from the Greek word pleurothallos, meaning "riblike branches". This refers to the rib-like stems of many species. The genus is often abbreviated as "Pths" in horticultural trade.

This was a huge genus, which contained more than 1,200 species - the second largest in the Orchidaceae after Bulbophyllum. In 2004, it decreased by more than half when many species were moved into new genera.

== Distribution ==
Pleurothallis is a completely New World group, widespread across much of Mexico, Central America, South America and the West Indies. Flora of North America lists one species in Florida (P. gelida) but this has now been transferred to a different genus, Stelis. The center of diversity of the genus is in the high Andes, especially in the chain of cloud forests in Colombia. Pleurothallis grows in dry or wet, tropical or temperate climates.

== Description ==
As a group they show a huge range in vegetative form, terrestrial or epiphytic, and can be found as tall cane-like plants a meter or so high, clumped or trailing, pendent or climbing, erect or creeping, tufted and tiny, delicate moss-like species that can grow on the thinnest of twigs. But they have one common denominator: they all have two pollinia.

They have reduced their pseudobulbs and instead, some species have thick succulent leaves.

Their flowers are among the most diverse and unusual, although often very small, and specialize in using tiny insects such as gnats, flies or small wasps for pollination.

== Taxonomy ==
To bring some order in this extremely diverse genus, 29 subgenera and 25 sections had been created. Much of this work has been done by Dr. C. Luer of the Missouri Botanical Garden. A new analysis, based on DNA testing, confirmed on the whole the classification of the subtribe Pleurothallidinae, with however Pleurothallis as the main difference. New genetic insight broke up this huge genus and made it more consistent with the principles of monophyletic genera and evolutionary relationships.

Several times before, a splitting up has been attempted, but there were always too many intermediate forms. In 2004 the genera Acianthera, Ancipitia, Antilla, Apoda-prorepentia, Areldia, Atopoglossum, Brenesia, Crocodeilanthe were created, incorporating a large number of former Pleurothallis species. The subgenera Pleurothallis and Specklinia are becoming separate genera, and the subgenus Acuminatae might become the proposed genus Anathallis.

Other allied genera include Dracula, Masdevallia, Restrepia, and Stelis.

== Species ==
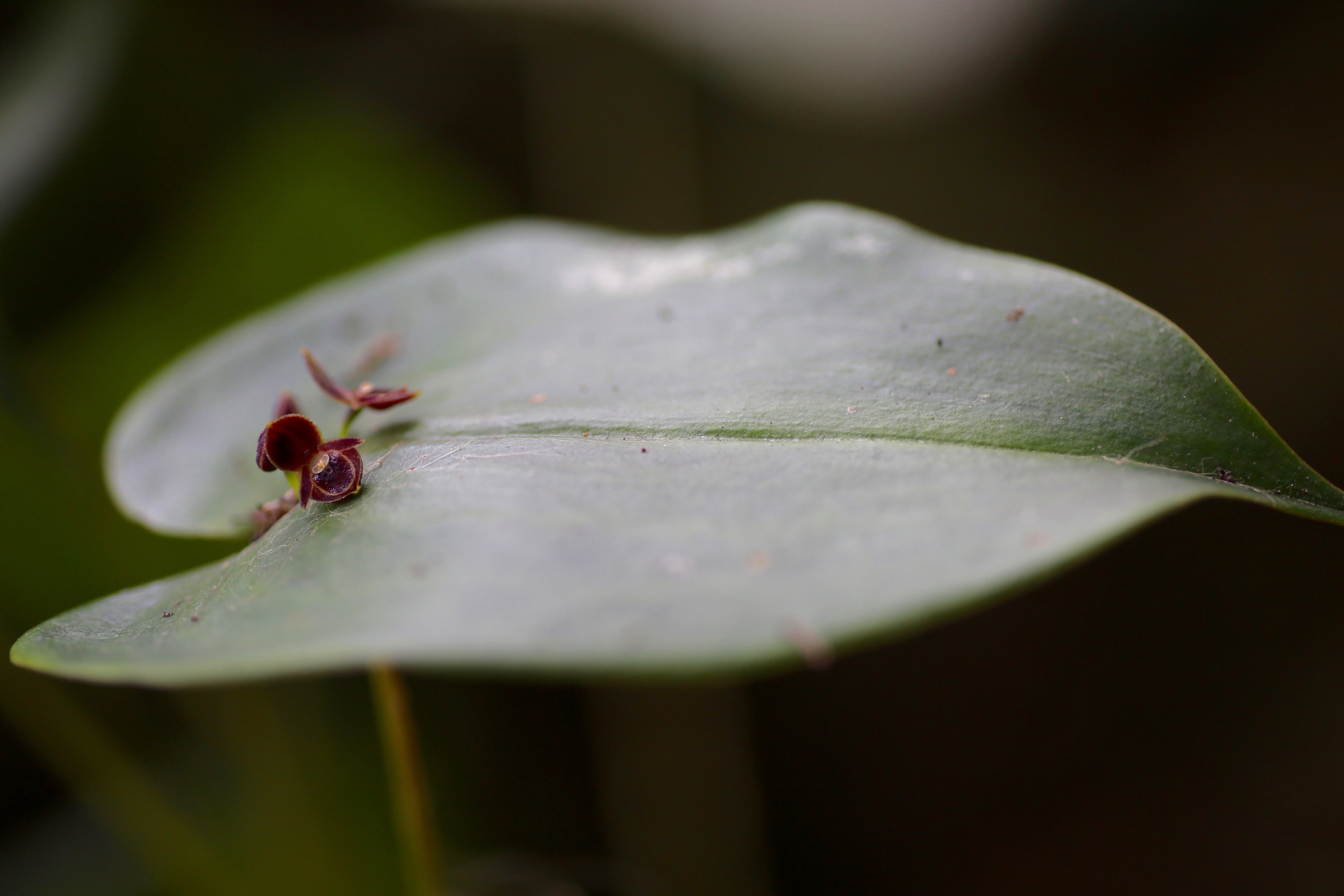
Pleurothallis trachysepala = Pleurothallis erymnochila

As of July 2023, Kew's Plants of the World Online listed around 555 species in the genus. Selected species include:

- Pleurothallis cardiothallis
- Pleurothallis crossota
- Pleurothallis dibolia
- Pleurothallis ensata
- Pleurothallis epiglottis
- Pleurothallis grobyi (now Specklinia grobyi)
- Pleurothallis fossulata
- Pleurothallis nipterophylla
- Pleurothallis prolaticollaris
- Pleurothallis pruinosa
- Pleurothallis ruberrima
- Pleurothallis ruscifolia
- Pleurothallis scurrula
