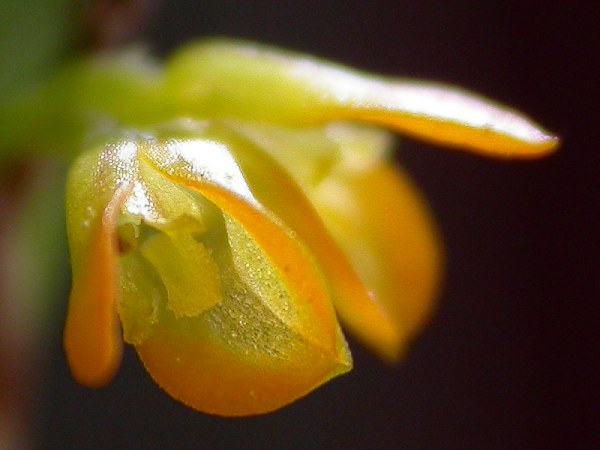

Scientific classification
- Kingdom: Plantae
- Clade: Tracheophytes
- Clade: Angiosperms
- Clade: Monocots
- Order: Asparagales
- Family: Orchidaceae
- Subfamily: Epidendroideae
- Genus: Acianthera
- Species: A. magalhanesii

Binomial name
- Acianthera magalhanesii (Pabst) F.Barros (2003)

= Acianthera magalhanesii =

Species of orchid

Acianthera magalhanesii is a species of orchid. It is originally from Mines Gerais and Bahia, Brazil. It belongs to the section Sicaria.

== Description ==
It is characterized by a cespitose growth with secondary stems (also called ramicauls), with the triangular upper section, wider in the base that in the leaf, subsessile inflorescence with few or many flowers, floral segments often thick, or slightly pubescent or papillose, in a group of more fibrous and resistant plants, with canaliculate ramicauls without wings or with narrow wings, that resemble an additional leaf. This species is similar to Acianthera oligantha but smaller, with flowers smaller and all the lip, yellow, extended in the intermediate part.

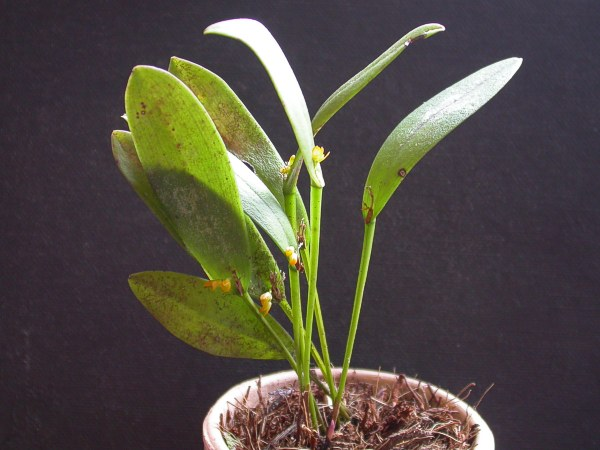
Sight of the plant

== Taxonomy ==
Acianthera magalhanesii was described by (Pabst) F.Muds and published in Hoehnea 30(3): 186. 2003

Etymology

Acianthera: generic name that it is a reference to the position of the anthers of some of his species.

magalhanesii: Epithet

Synonymity

- Pleurothallis magalhaesii Pabst

== Bibliography ==
- Muds, F. Of, (2003). Hoehnea 30(3): 186.
- Pridgeon, A.m., Cribb, P.J., Chase, M.C. & Rasmussen, F.N. (2006) Epidendroideae (Part One). Generate Orchidacearum 4: 328 ff. Oxford University Press.
- Chiron, G. R., Guiard, J. & They go they Give Berg, C. (2012) Phylogenetic relationships in Brazilian Pleurothallis sensu lato (Pleurothallidinae, Orchidaceae): evidence from nuclear ITS rDNA sequences, Phytotaxa 46: 34–58.
