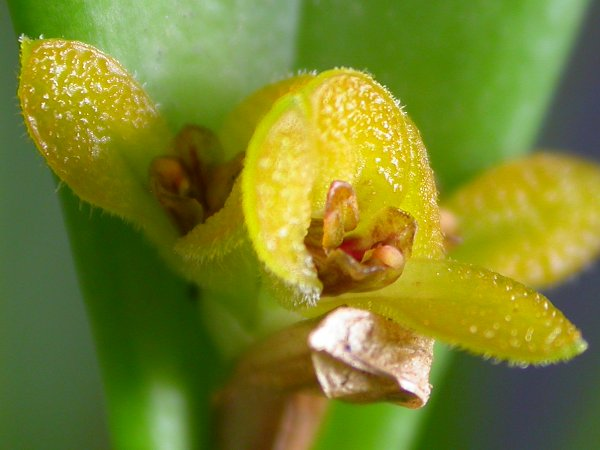

Scientific classification
- Kingdom: Plantae
- Clade: Embryophytes
- Clade: Tracheophytes
- Clade: Angiosperms
- Clade: Monocots
- Order: Asparagales
- Family: Orchidaceae
- Subfamily: Epidendroideae
- Genus: Acianthera
- Species: A. oligantha

Binomial name
- Acianthera oligantha (Barb.Rodr.) F. Barros (2003)

Synonyms
- Pleurothallis oligantha Barb.Rodr. (1881) (Basionym)

= Acianthera oligantha =

Species of orchid

Acianthera oligantha is a species of orchid.
