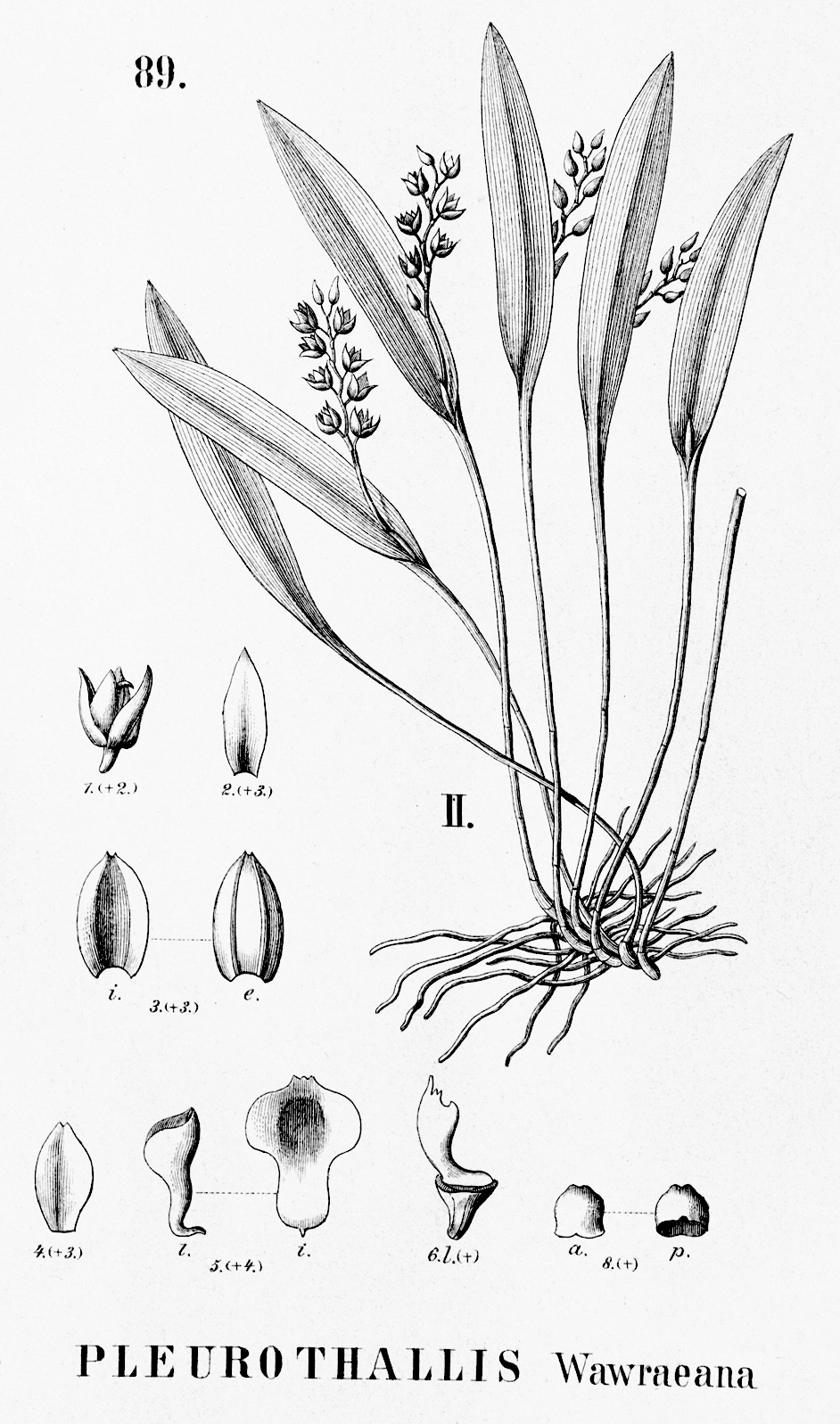
- Illustration of Acianthera wawraeana in Flora Brasiliensis

Scientific classification
- Kingdom: Plantae
- Clade: Tracheophytes
- Clade: Angiosperms
- Clade: Monocots
- Order: Asparagales
- Family: Orchidaceae
- Subfamily: Epidendroideae
- Genus: Acianthera
- Species: A. wawraeana

Binomial name
- Acianthera wawraeana (Barb.Rodr.) F.Barros & V.T.Rodrigues

Synonyms
- Pleurothallis wawraeana Barb.Rodr.

= Acianthera wawraeana =

Species of plant

Acianthera wawraeana is a species of orchid plant.
