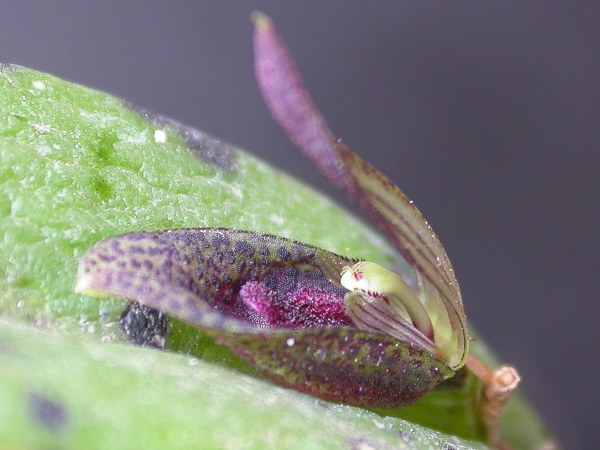

Scientific classification
- Kingdom: Plantae
- Clade: Tracheophytes
- Clade: Angiosperms
- Clade: Monocots
- Order: Asparagales
- Family: Orchidaceae
- Subfamily: Epidendroideae
- Genus: Acianthera
- Species: A. saundersiana

Binomial name
- Acianthera saundersiana (Rchb.f.) Pridgeon & M.W. Chase (2001)

Synonyms
- Pleurothallis saundersiana Rchb.f. (1866) (Basionym); Pleurothallis ascendans Garay; Pleurothallis felis-lingua Barb.Rodr. (1881); Pleurothallis josephensis Barb.Rodr. (1891); Pleurothallis juergensii Schltr. (1925); Pleurothallis auriculigera Hoehne & Schltr. (1926); Pleurothallis butantanensis Hoehne & Schltr. (1926); Pleurothallis insularis Hoehne & Schltr. (1926); Pleurothallis josephensis var. integripetala Hoehne (1929); Pleurothallis josephensis var. papillifera Hoehne (1929); Pleurothallis josephensis var. subcrenulata Hoehne (1929)S; Specklinia saundersiana (Rchb.f.) F. Barros (1983)

= Acianthera saundersiana =

Species of orchid

Acianthera saundersiana is a species of orchid. It is found in the São Paulo of Brazil.
