= Acianthera odontotepala =

Conservation status
- Vulnerable (IUCN 3.1)

Scientific classification
- Kingdom: Plantae
- Clade: Tracheophytes
- Clade: Angiosperms
- Clade: Monocots
- Order: Asparagales
- Family: Orchidaceae
- Subfamily: Epidendroideae
- Genus: Acianthera
- Species: A. odontotepala

Binomial name
- Acianthera odontotepala (Rchb.f.) Luer

Synonyms
- Pleurothallis odontotepala Rchb.f.

Species of plant

Acianthera odontotepala is a species of plant in the family Orchidaceae. It is an epiphytic orchid native to Jamaica, Cuba, and the Dominican Republic.

== Distribution and habitat ==
Acianthera odontotepala grows in montane rain forests in altitudes between 600 m (2,000 ft) and 1,300 m (4,300 ft) above sea level. It grows on tree trunks and branches.
