= Acianthera bissei =

Scientific classification
- Kingdom: Plantae
- Clade: Tracheophytes
- Clade: Angiosperms
- Clade: Monocots
- Order: Asparagales
- Family: Orchidaceae
- Subfamily: Epidendroideae
- Genus: Acianthera
- Species: A. bissei

Binomial name
- Acianthera bissei (Luer) Luer

Synonyms
- Pleurothallis bissei Luer

Species of orchid

Acianthera bissei is a species of orchid plant native to Cuba.
