= Begonia robusta =

Scientific classification
- Kingdom: Plantae
- Clade: Tracheophytes
- Clade: Angiosperms
- Clade: Eudicots
- Clade: Rosids
- Order: Cucurbitales
- Family: Begoniaceae
- Genus: Begonia
- Species: B. robusta

Binomial name
- Begonia robusta Blume

Synonyms
- List: Casparya robusta (Blume) A.DC.; Platycentrum robustum (Blume) Miq.; Sphenanthera robusta (Blume) Hassk. ex Klotzsch; Begonia robusta var. hirsutior (Miq.) Golding & Kareg.; Begonia splendida K.Koch; Begonia splendida f. argentea T.Moore; Begonia splendida guttata T.Moore; Platycentrum robustum var. hirsutior Miq.; Sphenanthera robusta var. viridis Hassk.

Species of flowering plant

Begonia robusta is a species of flowering plant in the family Begoniaceae, native to several of the Greater Sunda Islands. It is a rhizomatous begonia.

Begonia robusta can be found in Jawa, the Lesser Sunda Islands, Sulawesi, and Sumatra. It grows primarily upland of montane forests, and along water's edge near rivers and small island streams at elevations between 1,400 and 2,530 m (4,590 and 8,300 ft).
