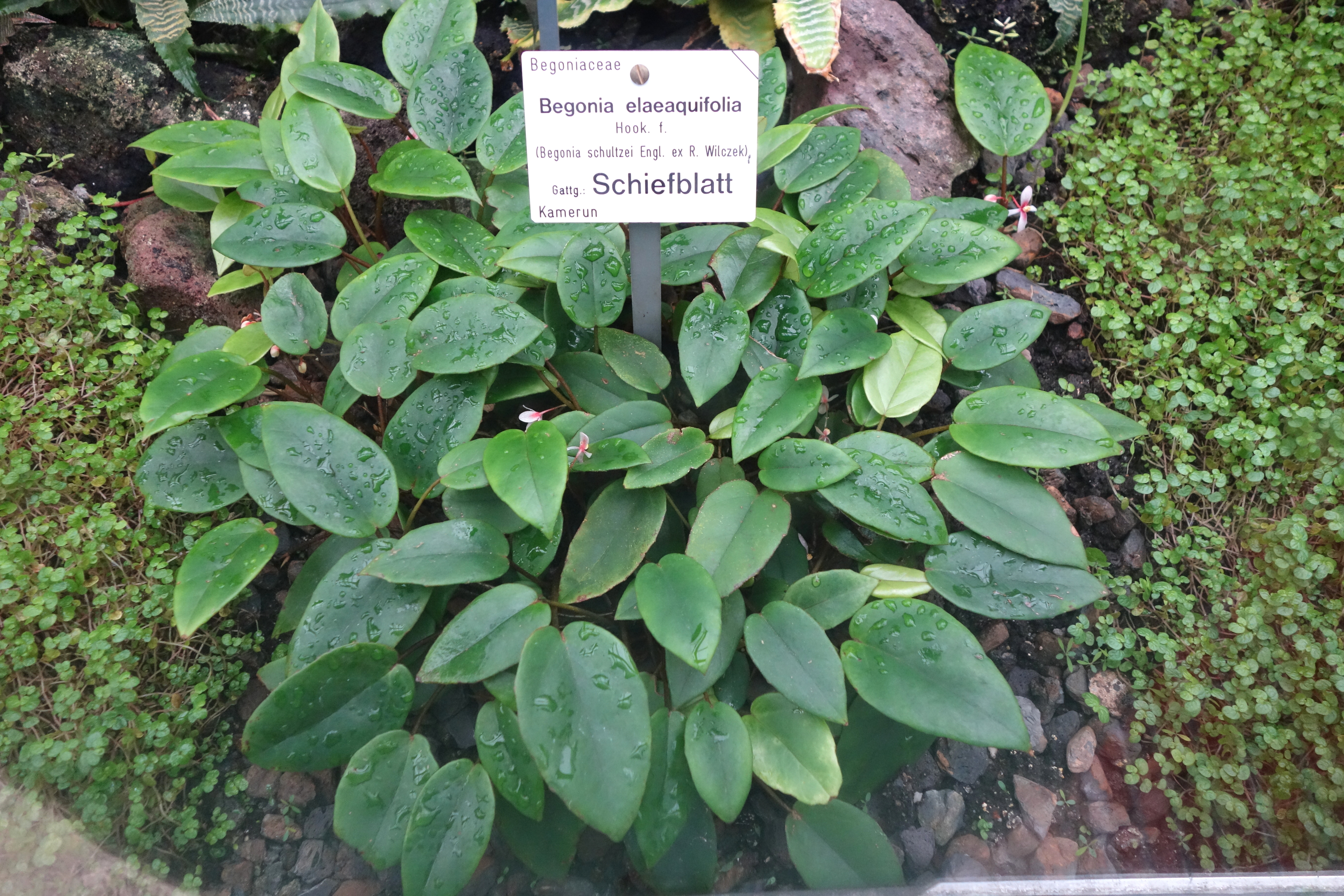

Scientific classification
- Kingdom: Plantae
- Clade: Tracheophytes
- Clade: Angiosperms
- Clade: Eudicots
- Clade: Rosids
- Order: Cucurbitales
- Family: Begoniaceae
- Genus: Begonia
- Species: B. elaeagnifolia

Binomial name
- Begonia elaeagnifolia Hook.f.

Synonyms
- Begonia schultzei Engl. ex R.Wilczek; Begonia wilczekiana N.Hallé

= Begonia elaeagnifolia =

Species of flowering plant

Begonia elaeagnifolia is a plant species in the family Begoniaceae, native to Africa from Cameroon to the Congo. Its small flowers are white-tipped pink.
