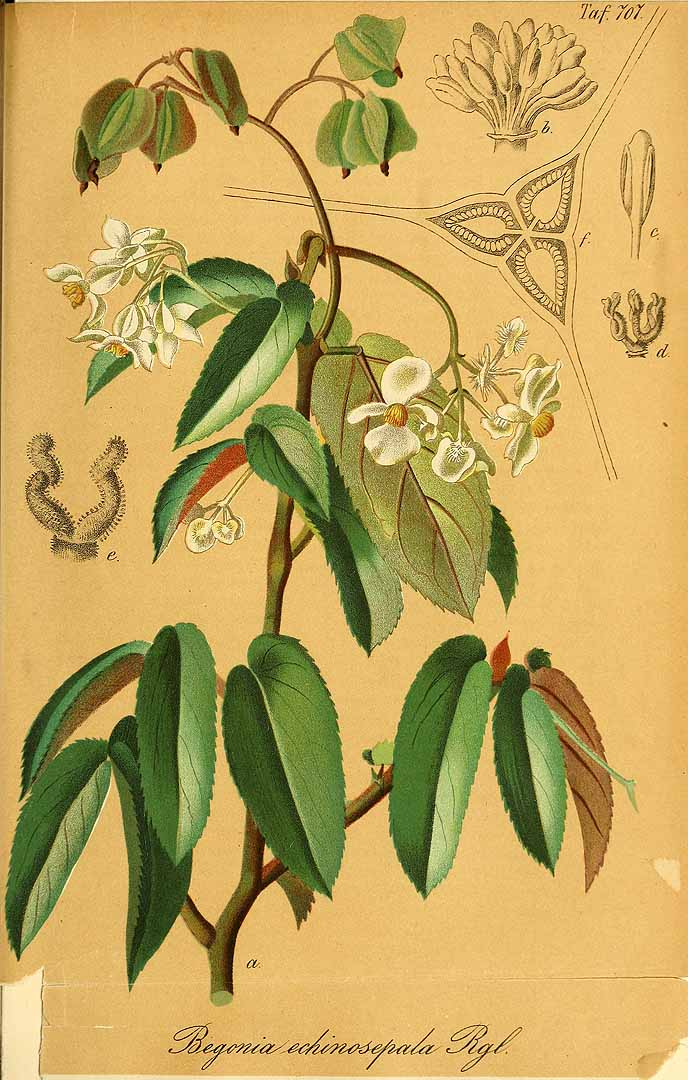

Scientific classification
- Kingdom: Plantae
- Clade: Embryophytes
- Clade: Tracheophytes
- Clade: Angiosperms
- Clade: Eudicots
- Clade: Rosids
- Order: Cucurbitales
- Family: Begoniaceae
- Genus: Begonia
- Species: B. echinosepala

Binomial name
- Begonia echinosepala Regel

Synonyms
- Begonia echinosepala var. elongatifolia Irmsch.

= Begonia echinosepala =

Species of flowering plant

Begonia echinosepala is a species of flowering plant in the family Begoniaceae, native to southeastern Brazil. A bush reaching 6 ft (180 cm), it is infrequently offered in the nursery trade.
