= Begonia geminiflora =

Conservation status
- Vulnerable (IUCN 3.1)

Scientific classification
- Kingdom: Plantae
- Clade: Tracheophytes
- Clade: Angiosperms
- Clade: Eudicots
- Clade: Rosids
- Order: Cucurbitales
- Family: Begoniaceae
- Genus: Begonia
- Species: B. geminiflora

Binomial name
- Begonia geminiflora L.B.Sm. & Wassh.

Species of plant

Begonia geminiflora is a species of plant in the family Begoniaceae. It is endemic to Ecuador as well as known from a population in Pichincha province recorded in 1980. Its natural habitat is subtropical or tropical moist montane forests. It is threatened by habitat loss.
