= Begonia aeranthos =

Conservation status
- Endangered (IUCN 3.1)

Scientific classification
- Kingdom: Plantae
- Clade: Tracheophytes
- Clade: Angiosperms
- Clade: Eudicots
- Clade: Rosids
- Order: Cucurbitales
- Family: Begoniaceae
- Genus: Begonia
- Species: B. aeranthos

Binomial name
- Begonia aeranthos L.B.Sm. & B.G.Schub

Species of flowering plant

Begonia aeranthos is a species of plant in the family Begoniaceae. It is endemic to Ecuador. Its natural habitat is subtropical or tropical moist montane forests. It is threatened by habitat loss.
