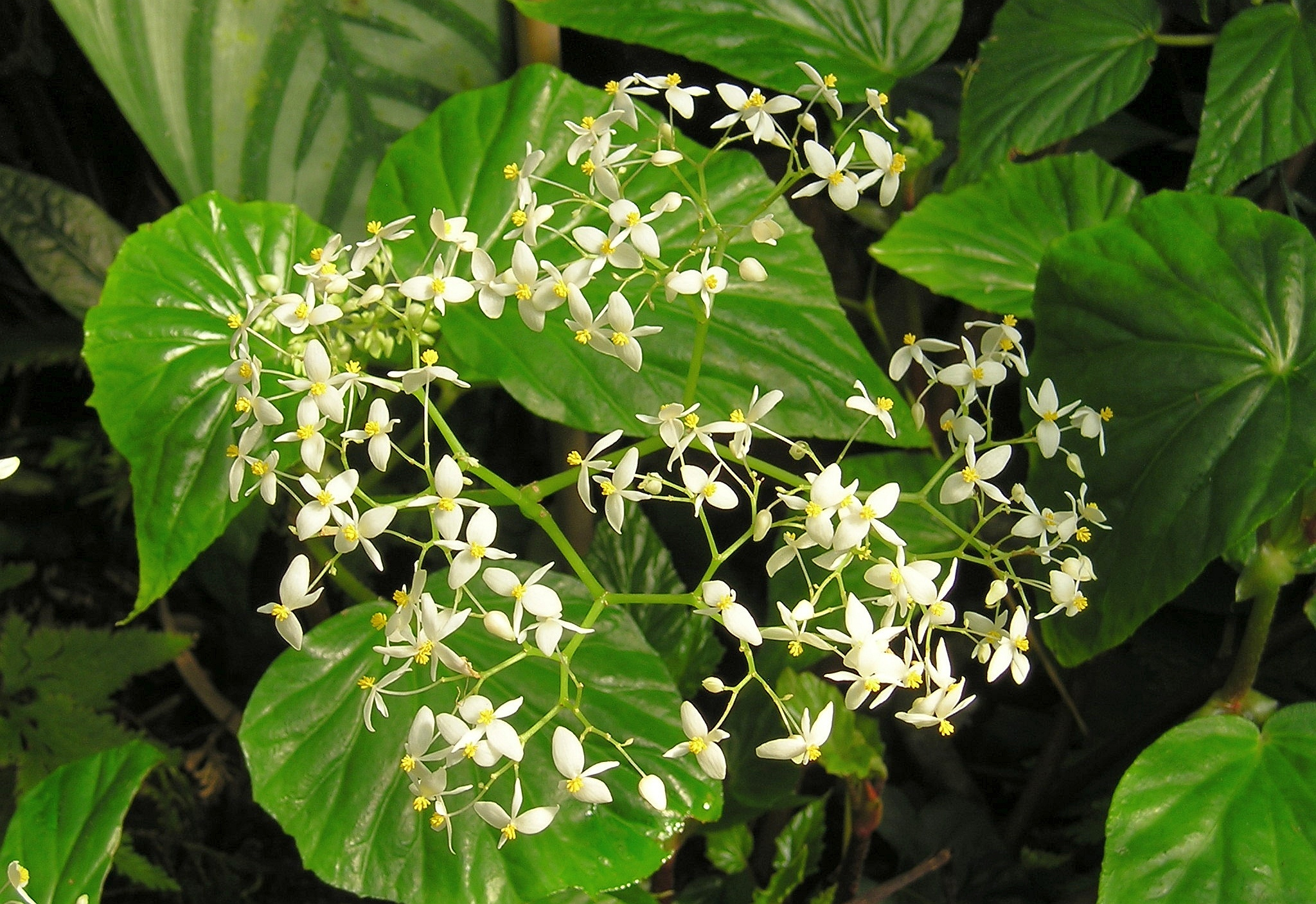

Scientific classification
- Kingdom: Plantae
- Clade: Tracheophytes
- Clade: Angiosperms
- Clade: Eudicots
- Clade: Rosids
- Order: Cucurbitales
- Family: Begoniaceae
- Genus: Begonia
- Species: B. capensis

Binomial name
- Begonia capensis L.f.

Synonyms
- List: Begonia tuberosa Lam.; Begonia diptera Dryand.; Begonia humilis Ker Gawl.

= Begonia capensis =

Species of flowering plant

Begonia capensis, also known as the Cape Begonia, is a species of flowering plant in the family Begoniaceae, found in Brazil. It's one of the earliest Begonias to be introduced to Great Britain, in 1800.
