= Begonia abbreviata =

Scientific classification
- Kingdom: Plantae
- Clade: Embryophytes
- Clade: Tracheophytes
- Clade: Angiosperms
- Clade: Eudicots
- Clade: Rosids
- Order: Cucurbitales
- Family: Begoniaceae
- Genus: Begonia
- Species: B. abbreviata

Binomial name
- Begonia abbreviata Ching-I Peng

Species of flowering plant

Begonia abbreviata is a species of flowering plant native to Vietnam in the family Begoniaceae.
