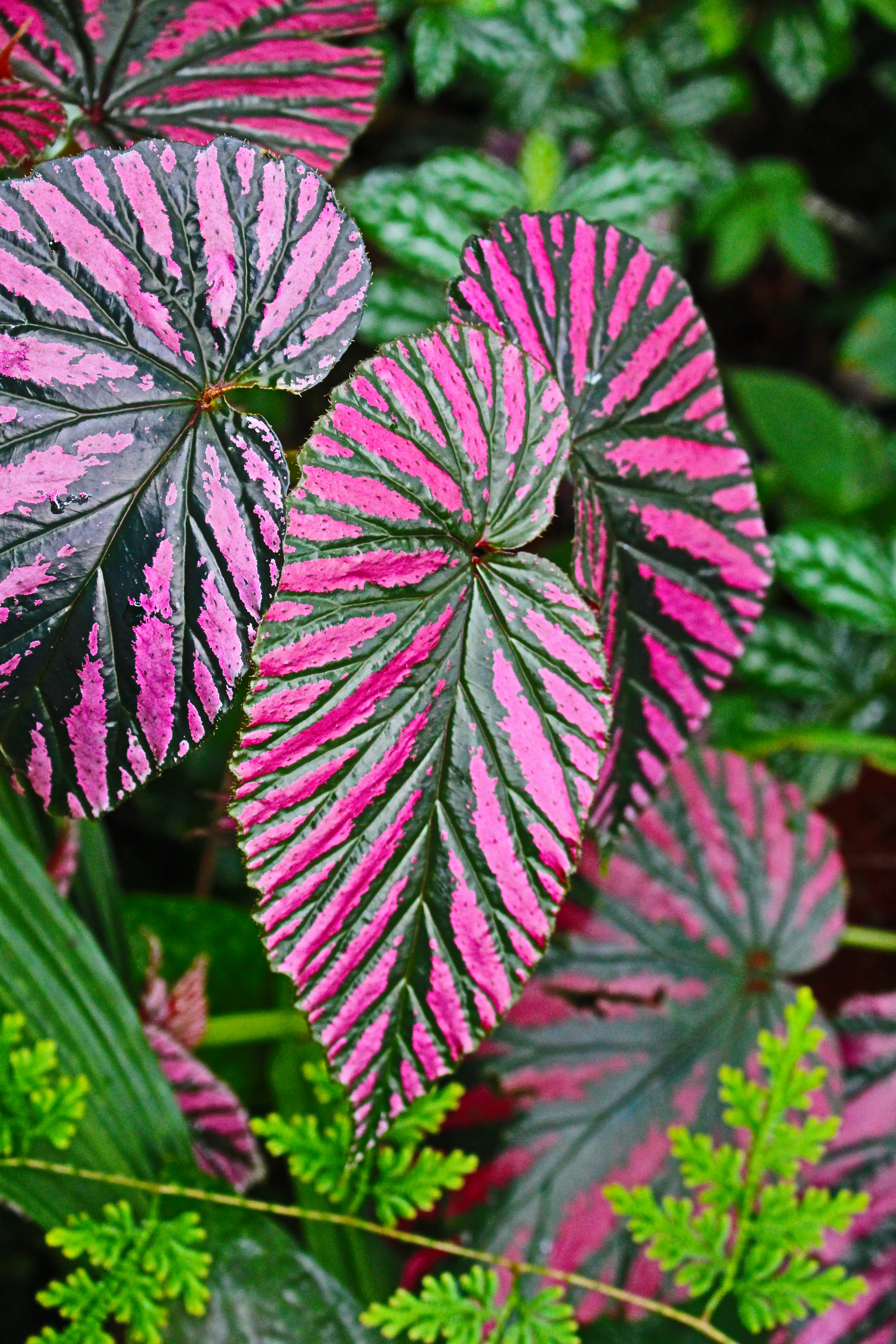
- Leaves

Scientific classification
- Kingdom: Plantae
- Clade: Tracheophytes
- Clade: Angiosperms
- Clade: Eudicots
- Clade: Rosids
- Order: Cucurbitales
- Family: Begoniaceae
- Genus: Begonia
- Species: B. brevirimosa

Binomial name
- Begonia brevirimosa Irmsch., 1913

= Begonia brevirimosa =

Species of flowering plant

Begonia brevirimosa is a species of flowering plant in the family Begoniaceae. It is native to New Guinea. The pink variegation occurs naturally. It grows as a plant up to 3 m tall. It is a common house plant and is abundant in the understory of tropical rain forest habitats. It has also been introduced as an occasional ornamental in the U.S states of Florida, Louisiana, South Carolina and even parts of California. It's pink leaves are a unique characteristic of this species.
