= Begonia taliensis =

Scientific classification
- Kingdom: Plantae
- Clade: Tracheophytes
- Clade: Angiosperms
- Clade: Eudicots
- Clade: Rosids
- Order: Cucurbitales
- Family: Begoniaceae
- Genus: Begonia
- Species: B. taliensis

Binomial name
- Begonia taliensis Gagnep.

Synonyms
- Begonia muliensis T.T.Yu

Species of plant

Begonia taliensis (syn. Begonia muliensis) is a species of flowering plant in the family Begoniaceae. It is found from Arunachal Pradesh in India, to Sichuan and Yunnan in China. A deciduous tuberous geophyte reaching 0.5 m (20 in), it is typically found in scrublands and forests at elevations from 1,300 to 2,400 m (4,300 to 7,900 ft). Its leaves can be up to 25 cm (10 in) long, with a mix of purplish, green, and silvery green blotches. The flowers are small and pink. It is available from commercial suppliers as a houseplant.
