= Begonia sarmentosa =

Scientific classification
- Kingdom: Plantae
- Clade: Tracheophytes
- Clade: Angiosperms
- Clade: Eudicots
- Clade: Rosids
- Order: Cucurbitales
- Family: Begoniaceae
- Genus: Begonia
- Species: B. sarmentosa

Binomial name
- Begonia sarmentosa L.B.Sm. & Wassh.

Synonyms
- Begonia elegans Elmer

Species of flowering plant

Begonia sarmentosa is a species of flowering plant in the family Begoniaceae native to the Philippines.
