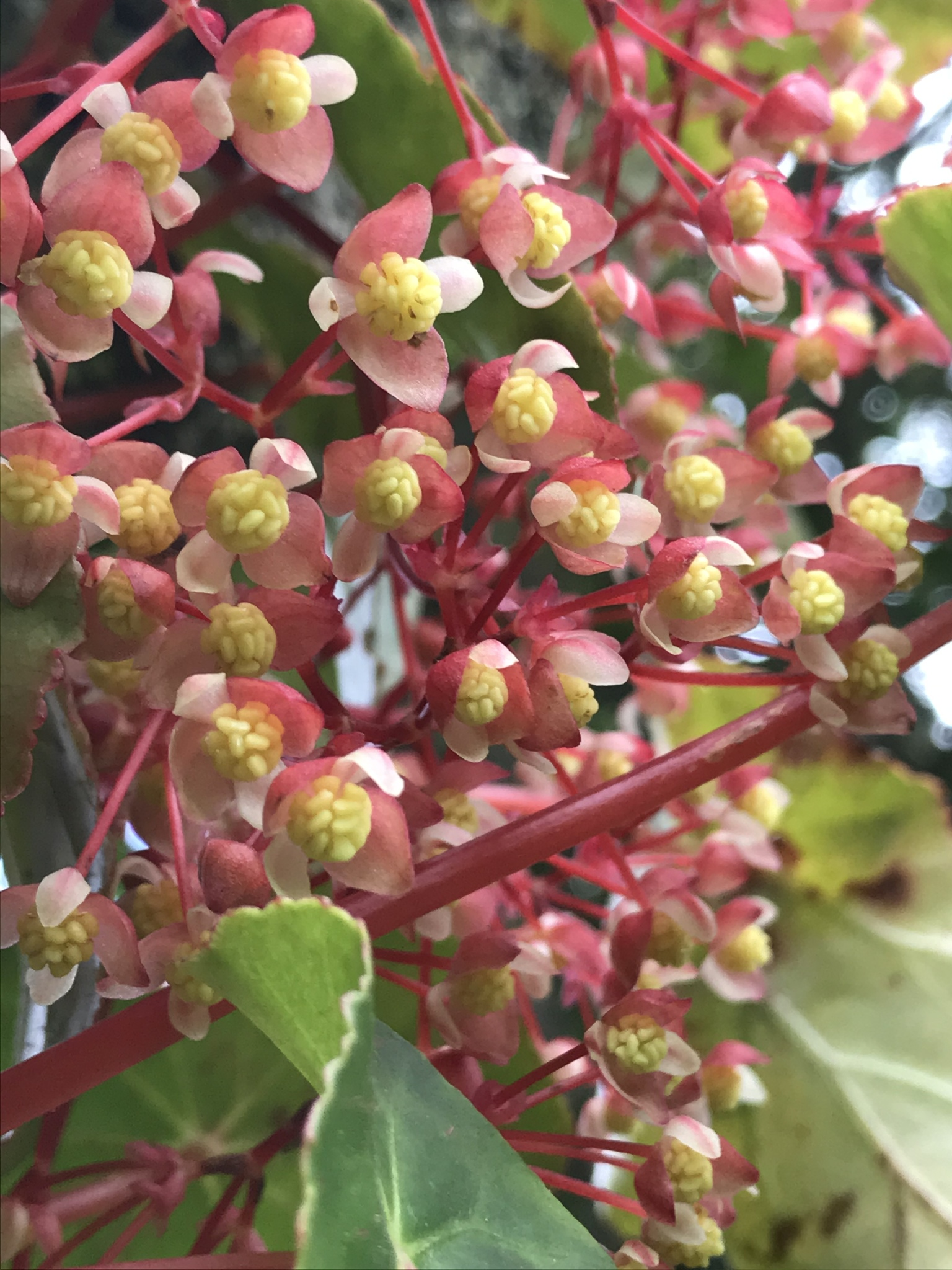
- Begonia tropaeolifolia flowers

Conservation status
- Endangered (IUCN 3.1)

Scientific classification
- Kingdom: Plantae
- Clade: Tracheophytes
- Clade: Angiosperms
- Clade: Eudicots
- Clade: Rosids
- Order: Cucurbitales
- Family: Begoniaceae
- Genus: Begonia
- Species: B. tropaeolifolia

Binomial name
- Begonia tropaeolifolia A.DC.

Synonyms
- Begonia sodiroi C.DC. in Bull. Herb. Boissier, sér. 2, 8: 323 (1908); Begonia spadiciflora L.B.Sm. & B.G.Schub. in Caldasia 4: 97 (1946); Begonia tropaeolifolia var. puberula L.B.Sm. & B.G.Schub. in Lloydia 13: 87 (1950)

= Begonia tropaeolifolia =

Species of flowering plant

Begonia tropaeolifolia is a species of plant in the family Begoniaceae. It is endemic to Colombia and Ecuador. Its natural habitat is subtropical or tropical moist montane forests. It is threatened by habitat loss.

The species was first described by Alphonse Pyramus de Candolle in Ann. Sci. Nat., Bot., sér. 4, 11: 120 in 1859.
