= Begonia lindleyana =

Scientific classification
- Kingdom: Plantae
- Clade: Tracheophytes
- Clade: Angiosperms
- Clade: Eudicots
- Clade: Rosids
- Order: Cucurbitales
- Family: Begoniaceae
- Genus: Begonia
- Species: B. lindleyana

Binomial name
- Begonia lindleyana Walp.

Synonyms
- Gireoudia lindleyana (Walp.) Klotzsch; Begonia vitifolia Lindl.; Gireoudia vitifolia Klotzsch

Species of flowering plant

Begonia lindleyana is a species of flowering plant in the family Begoniaceae, native to Guatemala, Honduras and Mexico.
