= Begonia beryllae =

Scientific classification
- Kingdom: Plantae
- Clade: Tracheophytes
- Clade: Angiosperms
- Clade: Eudicots
- Clade: Rosids
- Order: Cucurbitales
- Family: Begoniaceae
- Genus: Begonia
- Species: B. beryllae

Binomial name
- Begonia beryllae Ridl.

Species of flowering plant

Begonia beryllae is a species of flowering plant in the family Begoniaceae, native to the island of Borneo. The type specimen was from the slopes of Mount Kinabalu in Sabah at an elevation of approximately 1600 m (4800 feet) above sea level. It grows as an herb up to 3 m tall.
