= Begonia pelargoniiflora =

Conservation status
- Endangered (IUCN 3.1)

Scientific classification
- Kingdom: Plantae
- Clade: Tracheophytes
- Clade: Angiosperms
- Clade: Eudicots
- Clade: Rosids
- Order: Cucurbitales
- Family: Begoniaceae
- Genus: Begonia
- Species: B. pelargoniiflora

Binomial name
- Begonia pelargoniiflora J.J.de Wilde & J.C.Arends

Species of flowering plant

Begonia pelargoniiflora is a species of plant in the family Begoniaceae. It is native to Cameroon and Bioko island in Equatorial Guinea. Its natural habitat is subtropical or tropical moist lowland forests. It is threatened by habitat loss.
