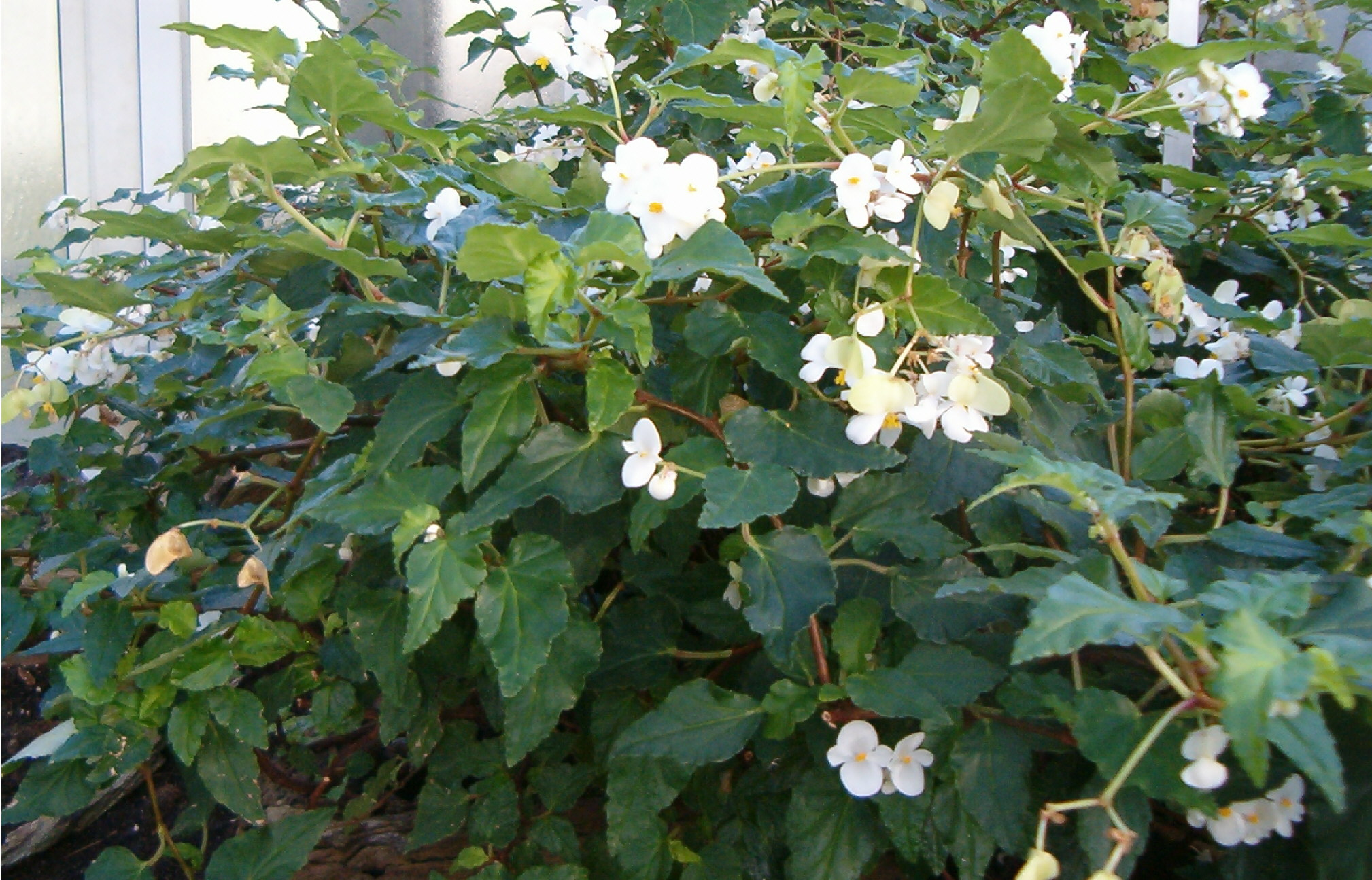

Scientific classification
- Kingdom: Plantae
- Clade: Tracheophytes
- Clade: Angiosperms
- Clade: Eudicots
- Clade: Rosids
- Order: Cucurbitales
- Family: Begoniaceae
- Genus: Begonia
- Species: B. cubensis

Binomial name
- Begonia cubensis Hassk.

= Begonia cubensis =

Species of flowering plant

Begonia cubensis, also known as Cuban holly, is a species of perennial plant that belongs to the Begoniaceae. It is native to Cuba and its habit is an understory shrub. Its habitat range is from moist subtropical to tropical climates.

Begonia cubensis is known for its colorful flowers and attractive leaves. It has small wavy gray/green leaves and short, thin semi-woody stems. It grows in humid and hot places on a wide range of well-drained soils, from sand to clay loam. The plants are monoecious. Slugs, snails and caterpillars eat the leaves of Begonia cubensis. Aphids can infest Begonia cubensis causing the leaves to wilt. In many places people eat local species of Begonia. However, Begonia cubensis has a bitter taste; therefore it is not preferred among other species of the same family.

Begonia cubensis are known to have a laxative effect and they are used for medicinal purposes. Medicinal mixtures can be prepared in different ways. A mixture made by soaking the flowers in hot water helps to eradicate headaches and relieve the body of toxins. The crushed flowers and leaves can also be rubbed directly on the skin to help alleviate pain and cure sores or burns.
