= Begonia baik =

Scientific classification
- Kingdom: Plantae
- Clade: Tracheophytes
- Clade: Angiosperms
- Clade: Eudicots
- Clade: Rosids
- Order: Cucurbitales
- Family: Begoniaceae
- Genus: Begonia
- Species: B. baik

Binomial name
- Begonia baik C.W.Lin & C.I Peng

Species of flowering plant

Begonia baik, the snowy bud begonia, is a species of flowering plant in the family Begoniaceae, native to Borneo. A creeping to sub-erect perennial with maroon to dark green rugose leaves, it is found growing at the base of sandstone cliffs or on earthy slopes.
