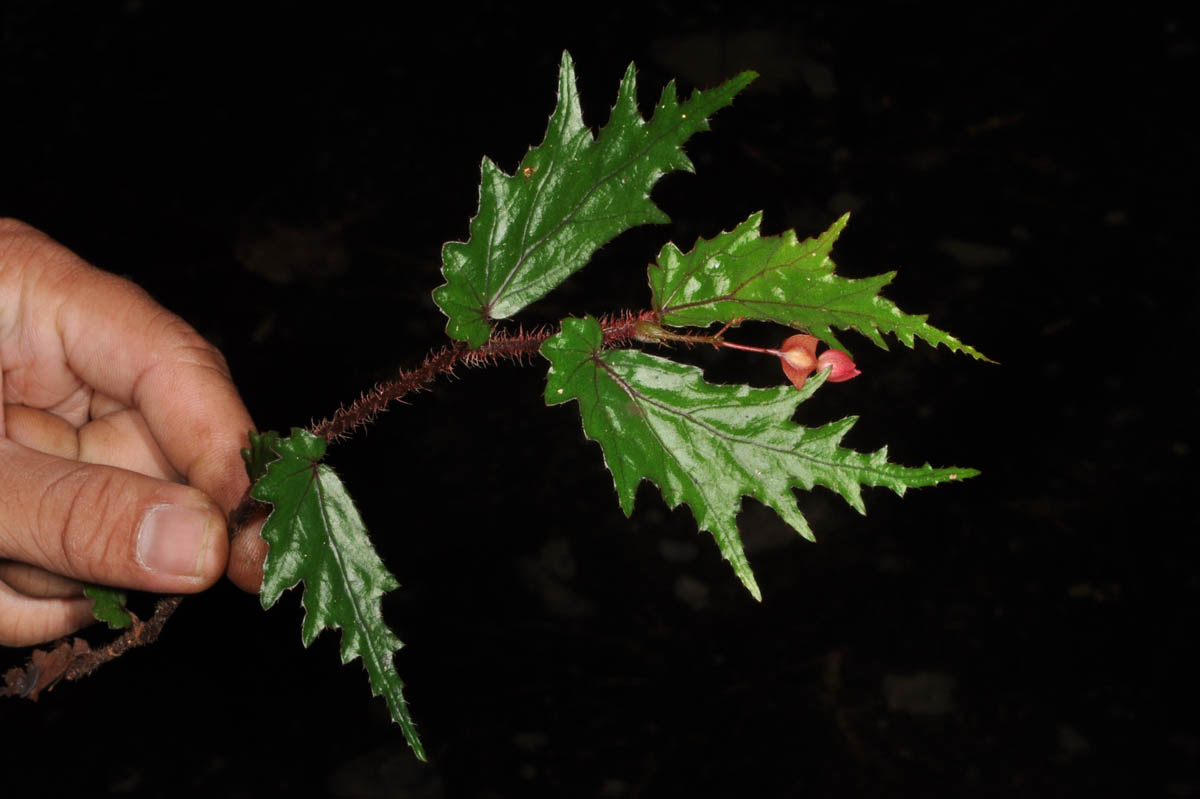
- Begonia bangsamoro flowering shoot

Scientific classification
- Kingdom: Plantae
- Clade: Tracheophytes
- Clade: Angiosperms
- Clade: Eudicots
- Clade: Rosids
- Order: Cucurbitales
- Family: Begoniaceae
- Genus: Begonia
- Species: B. bangsamoro

Binomial name
- Begonia bangsamoro Buenavista, Pranada & Y.P.Ang

= Begonia bangsamoro =

Species of flowering plant

Begonia bangsamoro is a species of flowering plant in the family Begoniaceae. It is native to the island of Mindanao in the Philippines, with specimens of the species spotted in Bukidnon and Lanao del Sur provinces. It is characterized by lacerated leaves and white dainty or pink flowers. It is named after the Moros (also known as the Bangsamoro people), who are the native Muslim population of Mindanao.
