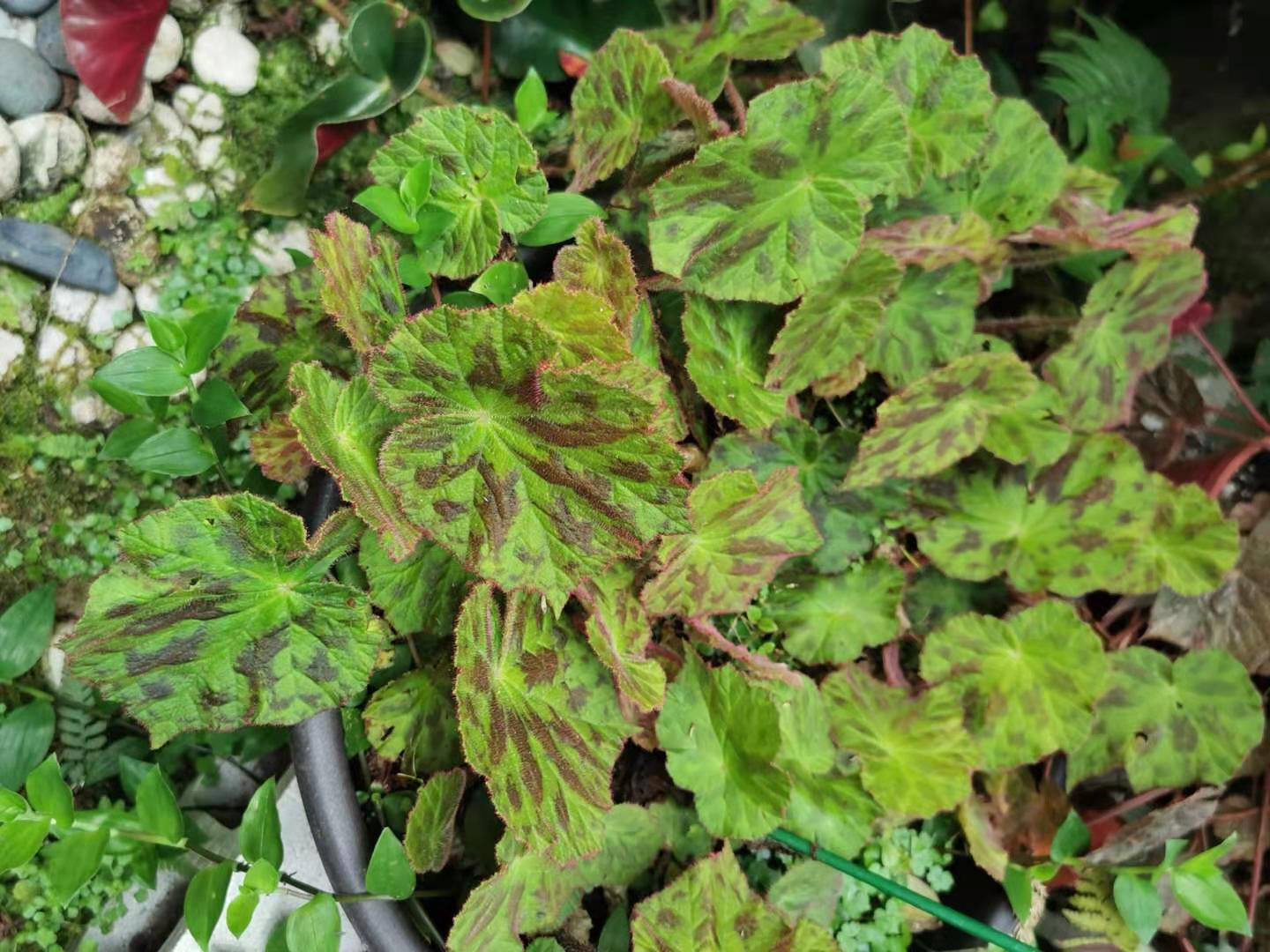

Scientific classification
- Kingdom: Plantae
- Clade: Tracheophytes
- Clade: Angiosperms
- Clade: Eudicots
- Clade: Rosids
- Order: Cucurbitales
- Family: Begoniaceae
- Genus: Begonia
- Species: B. luzhaiensis

Binomial name
- Begonia luzhaiensis T.C.Ku

= Begonia luzhaiensis =

Species of flowering plant

Begonia luzhaiensis is a species of Begonia found in Guangxi, China.
