= Begonia truncicola =

Conservation status
- Vulnerable (IUCN 3.1)

Scientific classification
- Kingdom: Plantae
- Clade: Tracheophytes
- Clade: Angiosperms
- Clade: Eudicots
- Clade: Rosids
- Order: Cucurbitales
- Family: Begoniaceae
- Genus: Begonia
- Species: B. truncicola

Binomial name
- Begonia truncicola Sodiro ex C.DC.

Species of flowering plant

Begonia truncicola is a species of plant in the family Begoniaceae. It is a vine endemic to Ecuador. Its natural habitat is subtropical or tropical moist montane forests. It is threatened by habitat loss, the only known natural threat to it.
