= Begonia ludwigii =

Conservation status
- Endangered (IUCN 3.1)

Scientific classification
- Kingdom: Plantae
- Clade: Tracheophytes
- Clade: Angiosperms
- Clade: Eudicots
- Clade: Rosids
- Order: Cucurbitales
- Family: Begoniaceae
- Genus: Begonia
- Species: B. ludwigii

Binomial name
- Begonia ludwigii Irmsch.

Synonyms
- Begonia compacticaulis Irmsch.

Species of flowering plant

Begonia ludwigii is a species of plant in the family Begoniaceae. It is a tuberous subshrub native to Ecuador and northwestern Peru. Its natural habitats are subtropical or tropical moist lowland forests and subtropical or tropical moist montane forests. It is threatened by habitat loss.
