= Begonia ludicra =

Scientific classification
- Kingdom: Plantae
- Clade: Tracheophytes
- Clade: Angiosperms
- Clade: Eudicots
- Clade: Rosids
- Order: Cucurbitales
- Family: Begoniaceae
- Genus: Begonia
- Species: B. ludicra

Binomial name
- Begonia ludicra A.DC.

Synonyms
- List: Begonia liebmannii A.DC.; Begonia repens (Hemsl.; Begonia reptans Liebm.; Weilbachia reptans Klotzsch & Oerst

Species of flowering plant

Begonia ludicra is a species of flowering plant in the family Begoniaceae, with a native range from Central Mexico to Central America. It was described in 1859 by Alphonse Pyrame de Candolle (1806–1893).

B. ludicra exhibits notable foliar diversity, with leaf shapes ranging from ovate to palmate and varying amounts of lobing. The cordate leaf base ranges from cuneate to broadly rounded, leaf margins crenate, dentate or ciliate, and the leaf surface can either be glabrous or pubescent. The coloring of the leaves can be green, bronze-green, blue-green, maroon and burgundy.
