= Begonia duncan-thomasii =

Conservation status
- Vulnerable (IUCN 3.1)

Scientific classification
- Kingdom: Plantae
- Clade: Tracheophytes
- Clade: Angiosperms
- Clade: Eudicots
- Clade: Rosids
- Order: Cucurbitales
- Family: Begoniaceae
- Genus: Begonia
- Species: B. duncan-thomasii

Binomial name
- Begonia duncan-thomasii Sosef

Species of flowering plant

Begonia duncan-thomasii is a species of plant in the family Begoniaceae. It is endemic to Cameroon. Its natural habitats are subtropical or tropical moist montane forests and rocky areas. It is threatened by habitat loss.
