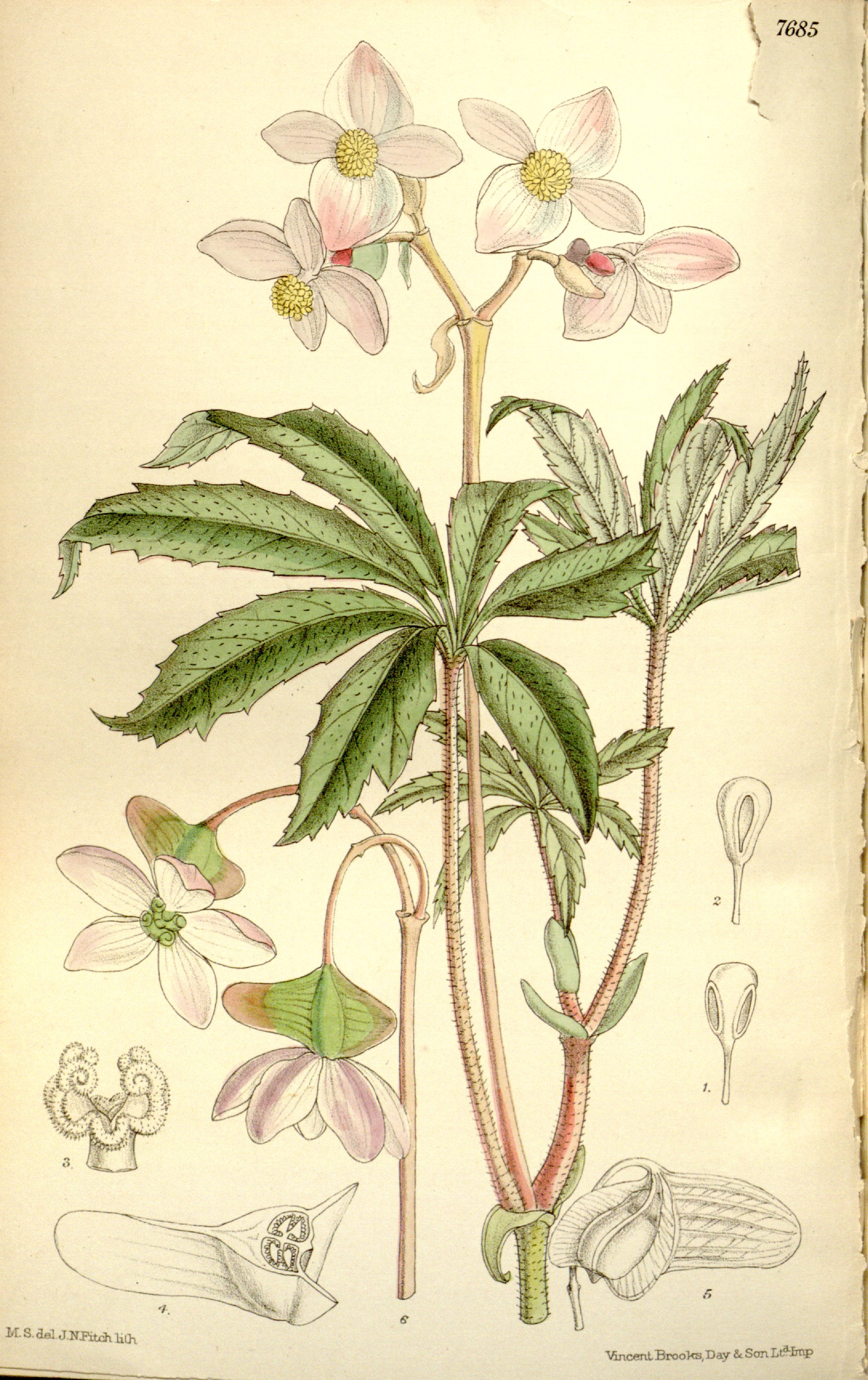

Conservation status
- Vulnerable (IUCN 3.1)

Scientific classification
- Kingdom: Plantae
- Clade: Tracheophytes
- Clade: Angiosperms
- Clade: Eudicots
- Clade: Rosids
- Order: Cucurbitales
- Family: Begoniaceae
- Genus: Begonia
- Species: B. hemsleyana

Binomial name
- Begonia hemsleyana Hook.f. (1899)

= Begonia hemsleyana =

Species of flowering plant

Begonia hemsleyana is a species of plant in the family Begoniaceae. It is a rhizomatous geophyte native to southwestern Guangxi and southeastern Yunnan in southern China, and to Laos, Myanmar, and Vietnam in northern Indochina.
