= Begonia puttii =

Scientific classification
- Kingdom: Plantae
- Clade: Tracheophytes
- Clade: Angiosperms
- Clade: Eudicots
- Clade: Rosids
- Order: Cucurbitales
- Family: Begoniaceae
- Genus: Begonia
- Species: B. puttii

Binomial name
- Begonia puttii Craib

Species of plant

Begonia puttii is a species of flowering plant in the family Begoniaceae, native to northern Thailand. A tuberous geophyte of subtropical climes, it is in a clade with the Chinese species Begonia labordei and an unnamed Chinese species.
