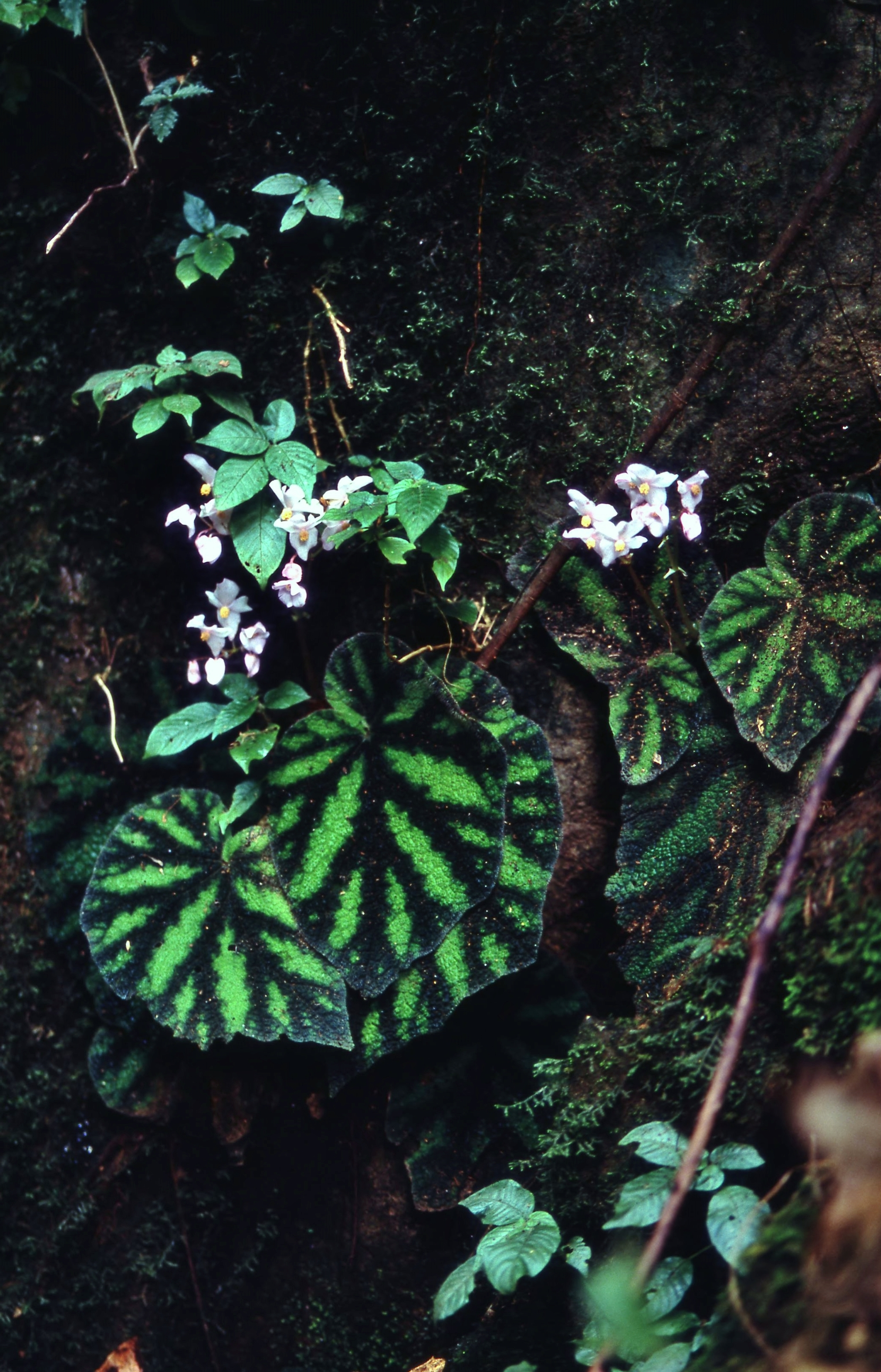

Scientific classification
- Kingdom: Plantae
- Clade: Tracheophytes
- Clade: Angiosperms
- Clade: Eudicots
- Clade: Rosids
- Order: Cucurbitales
- Family: Begoniaceae
- Genus: Begonia
- Species: B. thomsonii

Binomial name
- Begonia thomsonii A.DC.

Synonyms
- List: Begonia barbata Wall.

= Begonia thomsonii =

Species of flowering plant

Begonia thomsonii is a species of flowering plant in the family Begoniaceae, native to Assam, Bangladesh, East Himalaya, and Myanmar. It is a perennial, rhizomatous geophyte that grows in moist forests.
