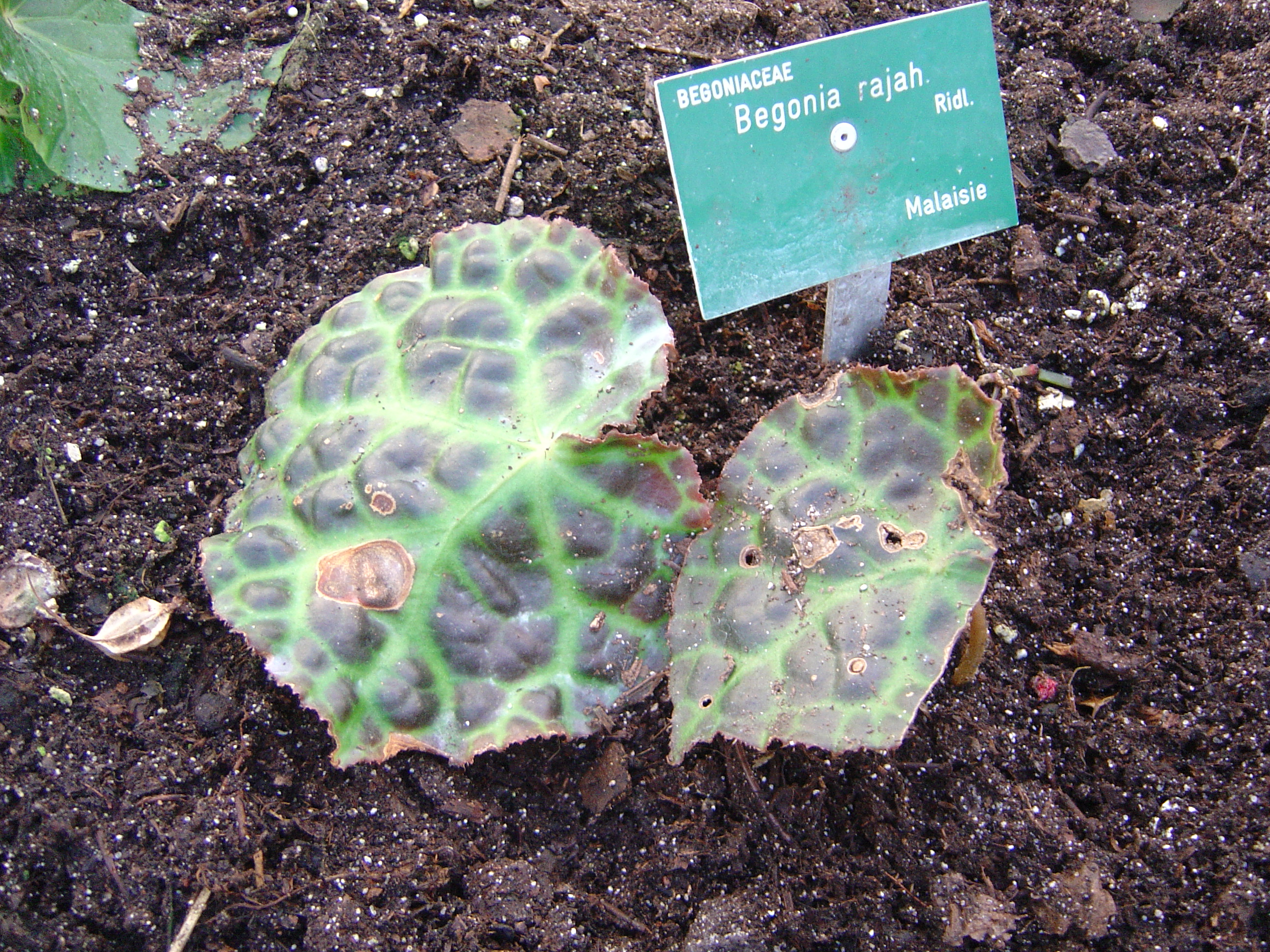
- A somewhat bedraggled specimen

Scientific classification
- Kingdom: Plantae
- Clade: Embryophytes
- Clade: Tracheophytes
- Clade: Angiosperms
- Clade: Eudicots
- Clade: Rosids
- Order: Cucurbitales
- Family: Begoniaceae
- Genus: Begonia
- Species: B. rajah

Binomial name
- Begonia rajah Ridl.

Synonyms
- Begonia peninsulae Irmsch.

= Begonia rajah =

Species of flowering plant

Begonia rajah is a species of flowering plant in the family Begoniaceae, native to Terengganu state, Peninsular Malaysia. It typically has striking bronze leaves and contrasting green veins, and is best suited for terrariums.
