= Begonia hainanensis =

Conservation status
- Endangered (IUCN 3.1)

Scientific classification
- Kingdom: Plantae
- Clade: Tracheophytes
- Clade: Angiosperms
- Clade: Eudicots
- Clade: Rosids
- Order: Cucurbitales
- Family: Begoniaceae
- Genus: Begonia
- Species: B. hainanensis

Binomial name
- Begonia hainanensis Chun & F.Chun

Species of flowering plant

Begonia hainanensis, the Hainan begonia, is a species of flowering plant in the family Begoniaceae. It is a subshrub endemic to Hainan in southern China. It grows in forests and on mossy rocks.
