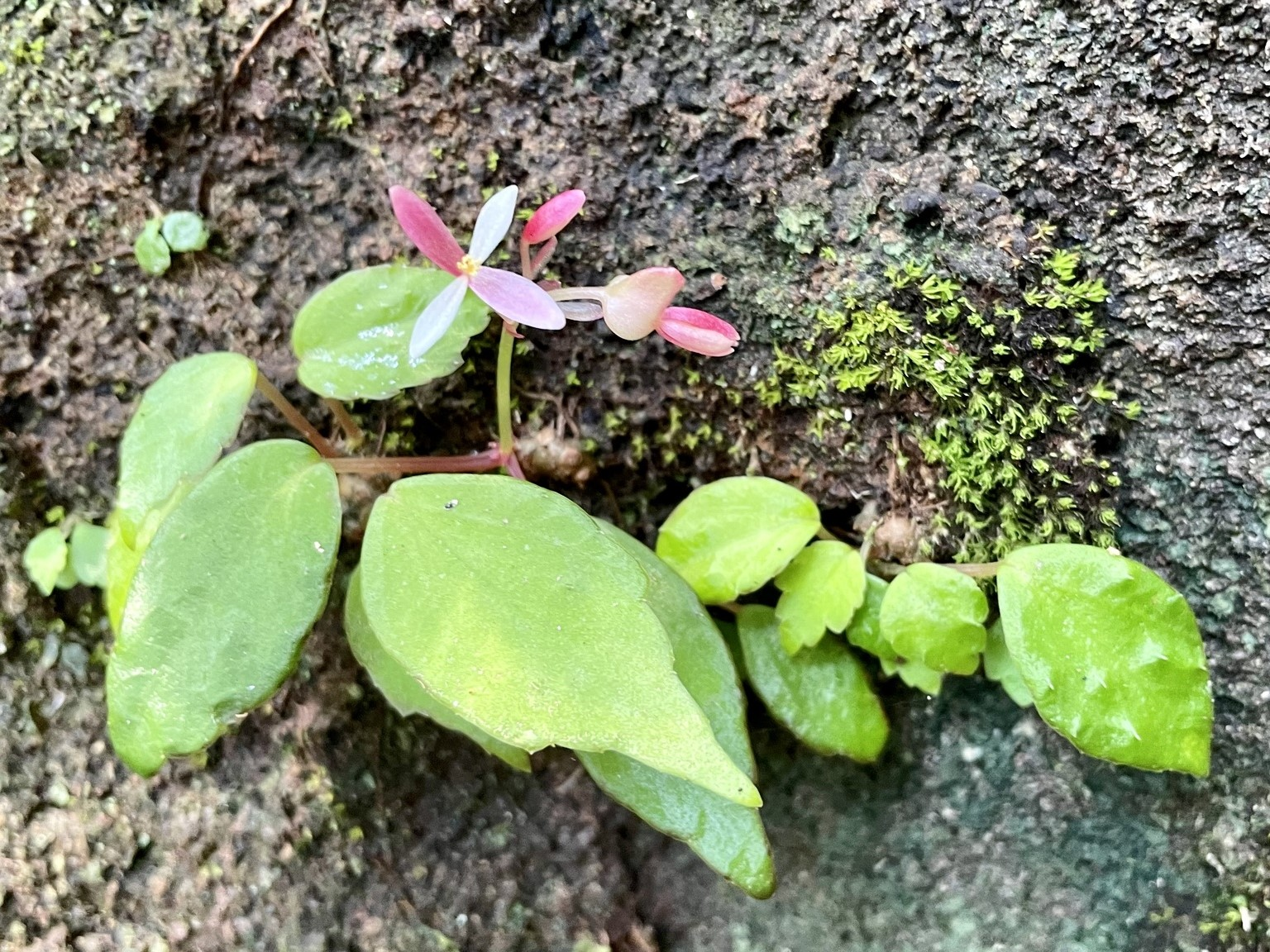

Conservation status
- Least Concern (IUCN 3.1)

Scientific classification
- Kingdom: Plantae
- Clade: Embryophytes
- Clade: Tracheophytes
- Clade: Spermatophytes
- Clade: Angiosperms
- Clade: Eudicots
- Clade: Rosids
- Order: Cucurbitales
- Family: Begoniaceae
- Genus: Begonia
- Species: B. nana

Binomial name
- Begonia nana L'Hér.

Synonyms
- Begonia warpurii Hemsl.

= Begonia nana =

Species of flowering plant

Begonia nana is a species of flowering plant in the family Begoniaceae, native to Madagascar. It is a tuberous geophyte.
