= Begonia retinervia =

Scientific classification
- Kingdom: Plantae
- Clade: Tracheophytes
- Clade: Angiosperms
- Clade: Eudicots
- Clade: Rosids
- Order: Cucurbitales
- Family: Begoniaceae
- Genus: Begonia
- Species: B. retinervia

Binomial name
- Begonia retinervia D.Fang, D.H.Qin & C.I.Peng

Species of plant

Begonia retinervia, also known as tu mai qiu hai tang (Chinese: 突脉秋海棠), is a species of Begonia endemic to the Guangxi region of China.

== Distribution and habitat ==
Begonia retinervia is known only from north-central Guangxi in southern China, where it grows on limestone slopes and inside damp limestone caves at altitudes of 200–550 m (660–1,800 ft).

== Description ==
This species has near black leaves with protruding veining. Its leaves are finely hairy and its flowers are whitish to pinkish in color.

== Ecology ==
Begonia retinervia flowers from August to October and fruits from November to March of the following year. It is considered rare within its range.
