= Begonia dentatobracteata =

Conservation status
- Vulnerable (IUCN 3.1)

Scientific classification
- Kingdom: Plantae
- Clade: Tracheophytes
- Clade: Angiosperms
- Clade: Eudicots
- Clade: Rosids
- Order: Cucurbitales
- Family: Begoniaceae
- Genus: Begonia
- Species: B. dentatobracteata

Binomial name
- Begonia dentatobracteata C.Y.Wu (1995)

Species of flowering plant

Begonia dentatobracteata is a species of flowering plant in the family Begoniaceae. It is a tuberous geophyte endemic to western Yunnan province in south-central China.
