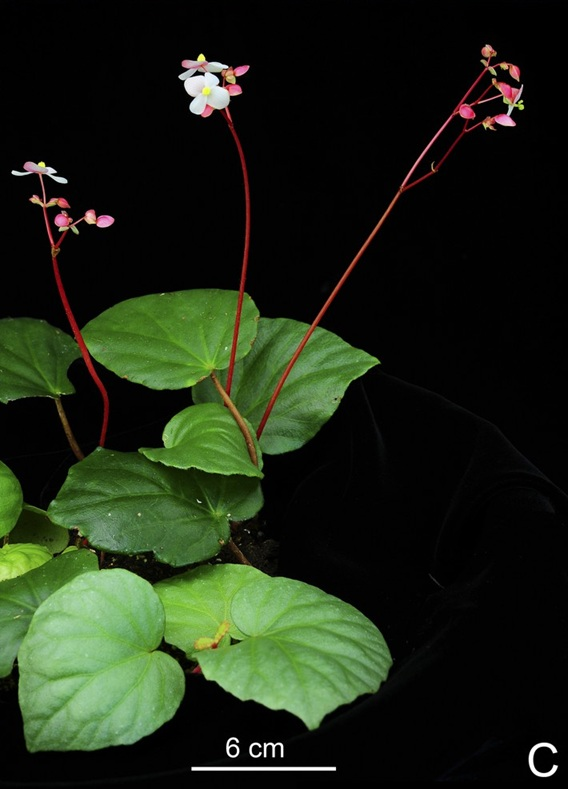

Scientific classification
- Kingdom: Plantae
- Clade: Tracheophytes
- Clade: Angiosperms
- Clade: Eudicots
- Clade: Rosids
- Order: Cucurbitales
- Family: Begoniaceae
- Genus: Begonia
- Species: B. tabonensis

Binomial name
- Begonia tabonensis C.I Peng & Rubite & C.W.Lin

= Begonia tabonensis =

Species of flowering plant

Begonia tabonensis, the Tapang Cave Begonia is an endemic species of Begonia discovered in Tabon Cave, Lipuun Point, Municipality of Quezo, in Palawan, Philippines. This species resembles B. mindorensis Merr., widely ovate and uniformly green leaves, and inflorescence with sessile glands. However the two species differs on several characteristics: Begonia tabonensis have shorter petioles(10 cm long), smaller leaves(4-8 x 4–6.4 cm); deciduous, chartaceous, glabrous or very sparsely glandular bracts; and slightly pointed, crescent-shaped ovary wing; whereas, B. mindorensis have longer petioles(25 cm long), larger leaves(10-15 x 6-10 cm); persistent, coriaceous, densely glandular bracts; and acute, triangular ovary wing.

== Etymology ==
The specific epithet refers to Tabon Cave where the new species was discovered.
