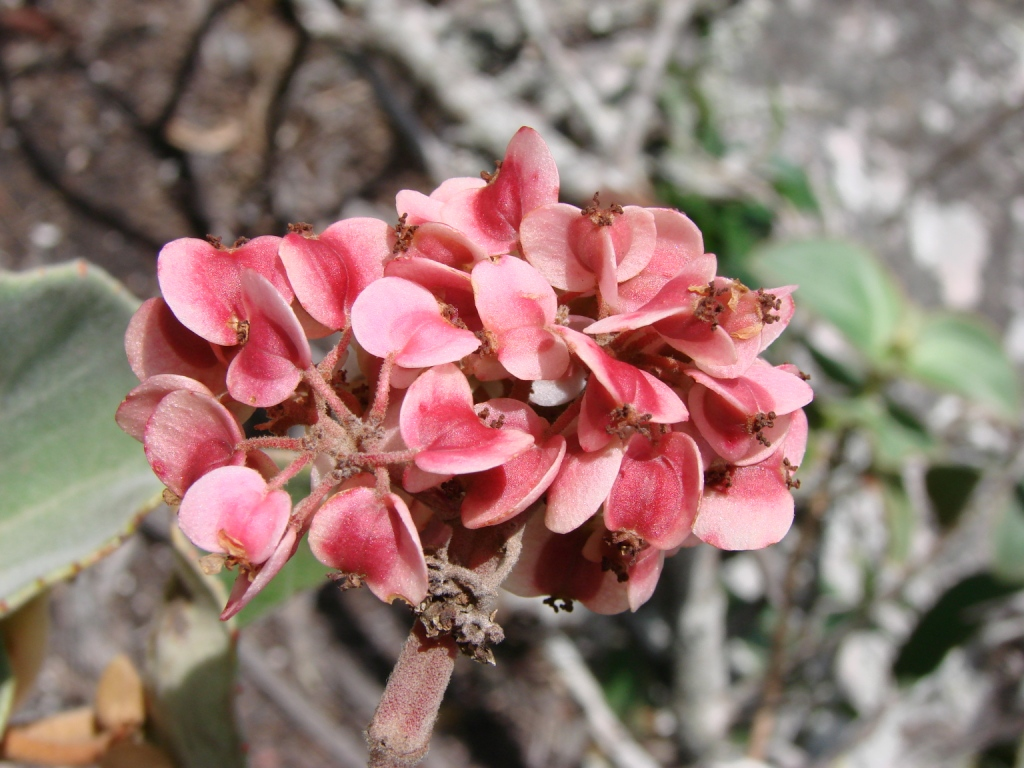
- Ovaries
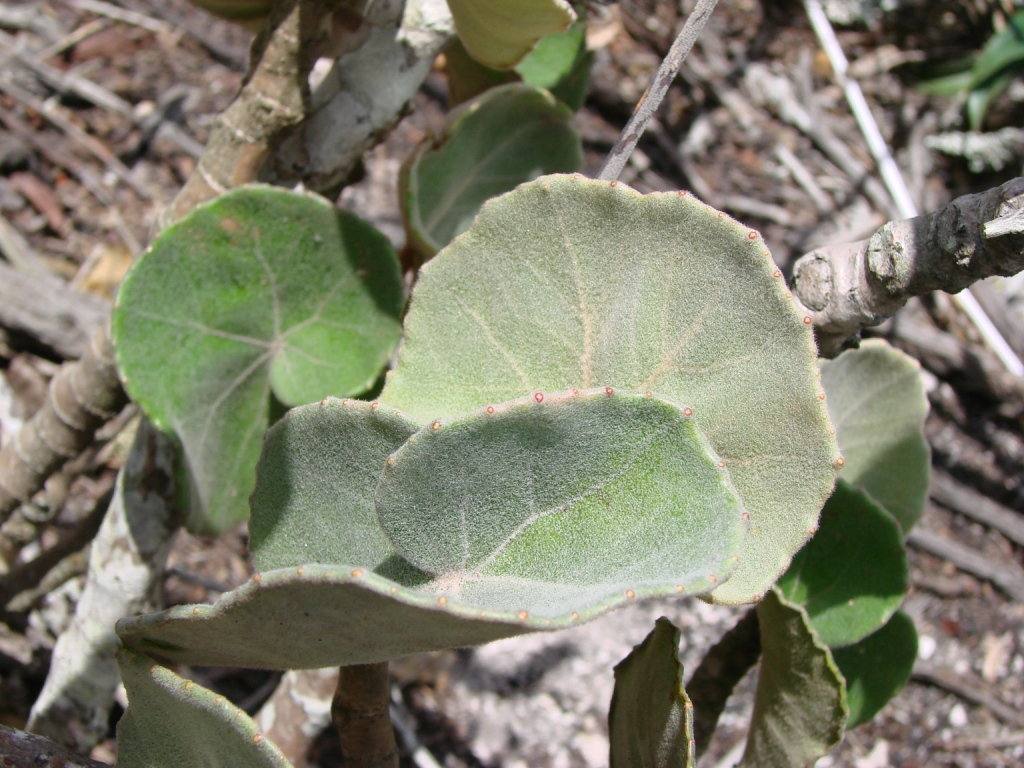
- Leaves

Scientific classification
- Kingdom: Plantae
- Clade: Tracheophytes
- Clade: Angiosperms
- Clade: Eudicots
- Clade: Rosids
- Order: Cucurbitales
- Family: Begoniaceae
- Genus: Begonia
- Species: B. grisea

Binomial name
- Begonia grisea A.DC.

Synonyms
- Begonia ragozinii Schwacke

= Begonia grisea =

Species of plant

Begonia grisea is a species of flowering plant in the family Begoniaceae, native to northeastern Brazil. Its leaf teeth arise from nectary tissue.
