= Begonia roxburghii =

Scientific classification
- Kingdom: Plantae
- Clade: Tracheophytes
- Clade: Angiosperms
- Clade: Eudicots
- Clade: Rosids
- Order: Cucurbitales
- Family: Begoniaceae
- Genus: Begonia
- Species: B. roxburghii

Binomial name
- Begonia roxburghii A.DC.

Synonyms
- Heterophragma roxburghii A.DC.

Species of flowering plant

Begonia roxburghii is a species of plant in the family Begoniaceae.

The Latin specific epithet roxburghii refers to the Scottish Botanist William Roxburgh.
