= Begonia thiemei =

Scientific classification
- Kingdom: Plantae
- Clade: Tracheophytes
- Clade: Angiosperms
- Clade: Eudicots
- Clade: Rosids
- Order: Cucurbitales
- Family: Begoniaceae
- Genus: Begonia
- Species: B. thiemei

Binomial name
- Begonia thiemei C.DC.

Synonyms
- Begonia macdougallii Ziesenh.

Species of plant

Begonia thiemei, the palm leaf begonia, is a species of flowering plant in the family Begoniaceae, native to southeastern Mexico, Guatemala, and Honduras. A perennial reaching 20 cm (8 in) tall but spreading to 46 cm (18 in) wide, it is cultivated for its palmate foliage. A cultivar, 'Purpurea', is often called Begonia macdougallii var. purpurea in the trade.
