= Begonia lugonis =

Conservation status
- Vulnerable (IUCN 3.1)

Scientific classification
- Kingdom: Plantae
- Clade: Tracheophytes
- Clade: Angiosperms
- Clade: Eudicots
- Clade: Rosids
- Order: Cucurbitales
- Family: Begoniaceae
- Genus: Begonia
- Species: B. lugonis

Binomial name
- Begonia lugonis L.B.Sm. & Wassh.

Species of flowering plant

Begonia lugonis is a species of plant in the family Begoniaceae. It is native to South and Central America Its natural habitat is subtropical or tropical moist montane forests.
