= Begonia tenuibracteata =

Scientific classification
- Kingdom: Plantae
- Clade: Tracheophytes
- Clade: Angiosperms
- Clade: Eudicots
- Clade: Rosids
- Order: Cucurbitales
- Family: Begoniaceae
- Genus: Begonia
- Species: B. tenuibracteata

Binomial name
- Begonia tenuibracteata C.I Peng & Rubite & C.W.Lin

Species of flowering plant

Begonia tenuibracteata is an endemic species of Begonia discovered in Salakot Falls, Napsan, Puerto Princesa City, in northern Palawan, Philippines occurring on mossy boulders along road cut in shaded, wet lowland forest. This species, along with B. mindorensis, produces the unusual, conspicuous, persistent bracts on the inflorescences. However, it sharply distinct from the latter due to its ovate to lanceolate bracts, which are hyaline, membranaceous, glabrous or with very sparse sessile glands where the latter have widely to depressed ovate bracts that are coriaceous, densely clothed with sessile glands. Additionally, B. tenuibracteata differs by the congested rhizomes with internodes only to 3 mm long; with shorter petioles (to 7 cm long); velvety upper leaf surface; shorter inflorescence (to 22 cm); and fewer stamens (40–50); whereas B. mindorensis have 20 mm long rhizome internodes, petioles 10–25 cm long, glossy upper leaf surface, inflorescence over 35 cm long, and up to ca. 70 stamens

== Etymology ==
The specific epithet refers to the hyaline, membranaceous bracts of this species.
