= Begonia preussii =

Conservation status
- Vulnerable (IUCN 3.1)

Scientific classification
- Kingdom: Plantae
- Clade: Tracheophytes
- Clade: Angiosperms
- Clade: Eudicots
- Clade: Rosids
- Order: Cucurbitales
- Family: Begoniaceae
- Genus: Begonia
- Species: B. preussii

Binomial name
- Begonia preussii Warb.

Species of flowering plant

Begonia preussii is a species of plant in the family Begoniaceae. It is found in Cameroon, Equatorial Guinea, and Nigeria. Its natural habitat is subtropical or tropical moist lowland forests. It is threatened by habitat loss.
