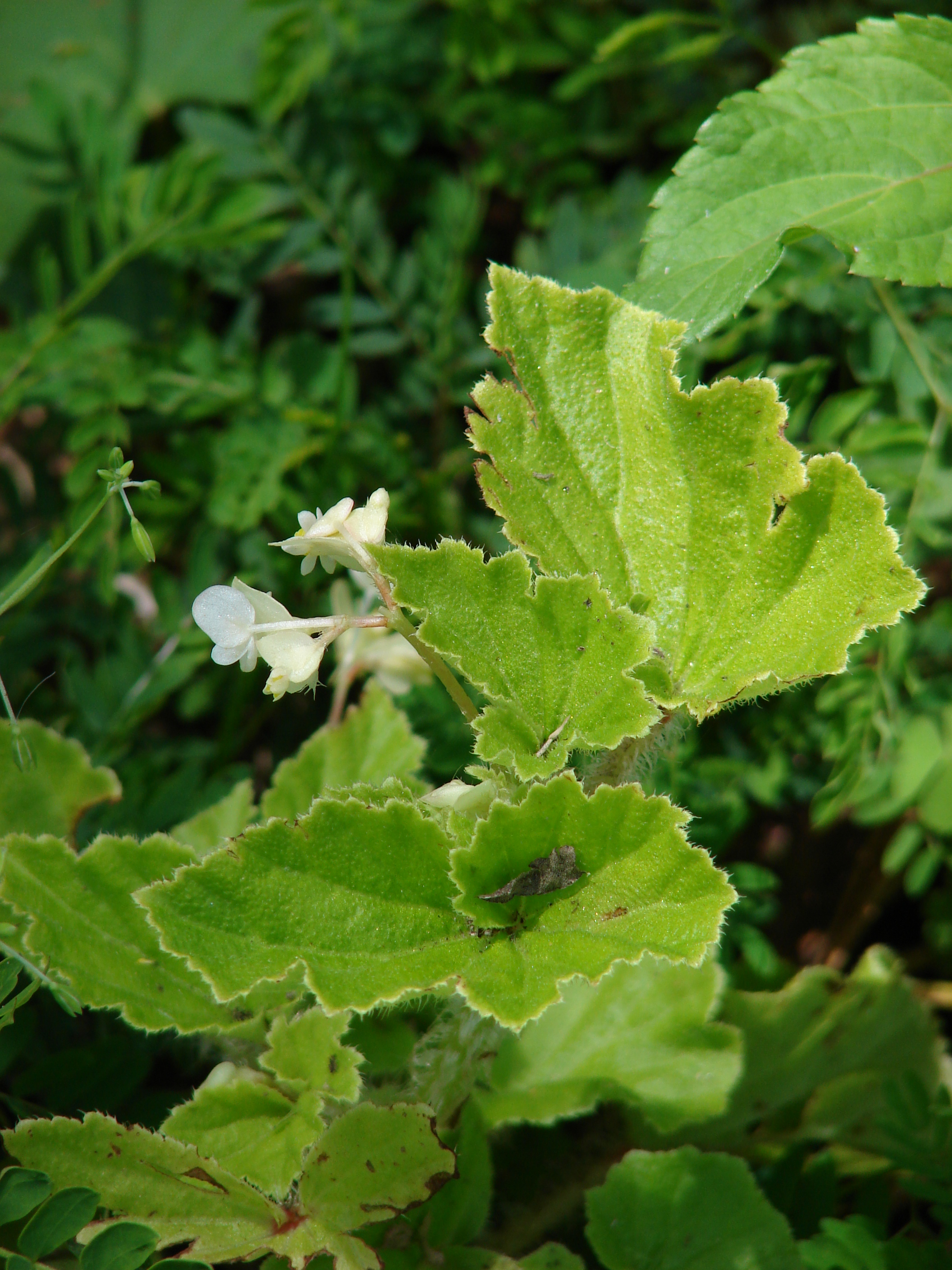
- In Hawaii
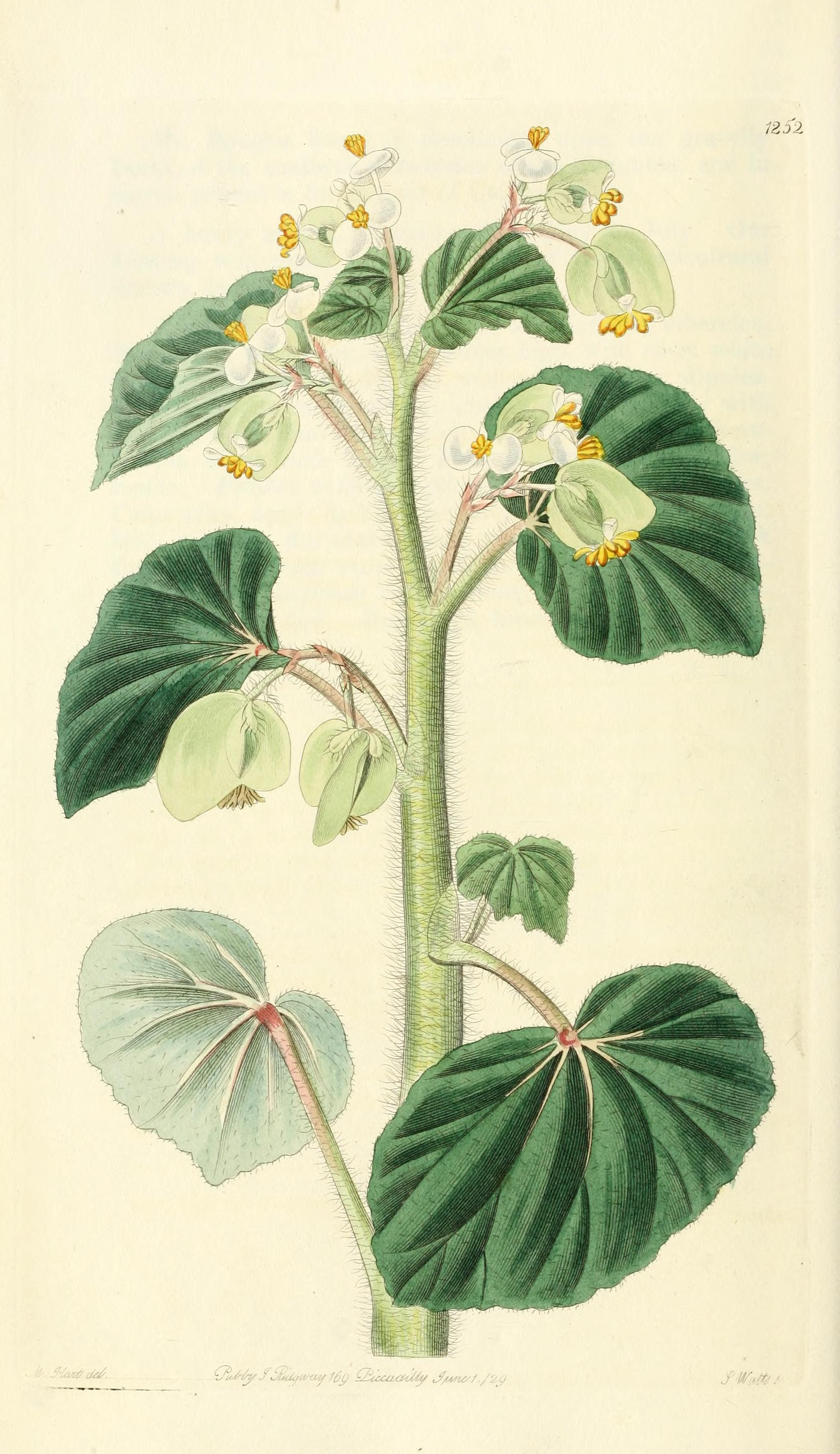
- Botanical illustration

Scientific classification
- Kingdom: Plantae
- Clade: Tracheophytes
- Clade: Angiosperms
- Clade: Eudicots
- Clade: Rosids
- Order: Cucurbitales
- Family: Begoniaceae
- Genus: Begonia
- Species: B. hirtella

Binomial name
- Begonia hirtella Link

Synonyms
- List: Begonia albidosetulosa Hassk.; Begonia brasila A.DC.; Begonia brasiliana Schrank ex Steud.; Begonia ciliata Kunth; Begonia ciliata var. nana Klotzsch ex A.DC.; Begonia dasypoda Meisn. ex A.DC.; Begonia diversifolia var. nana Walp.; Begonia herteri Irmsch.; Begonia hirtella var. nana A.DC.; Begonia villosa Lindl.

= Begonia hirtella =

Species of plant

Begonia hirtella, the bearded begonia, is a species of flowering plant in the family Begoniaceae. It is native to Jamaica, Venezuela, Colombia, Peru, Bolivia, and southern Brazil, and has been introduced to many tropical locales around the world. People apply its juices to their skin to treat itchiness from insect bites.

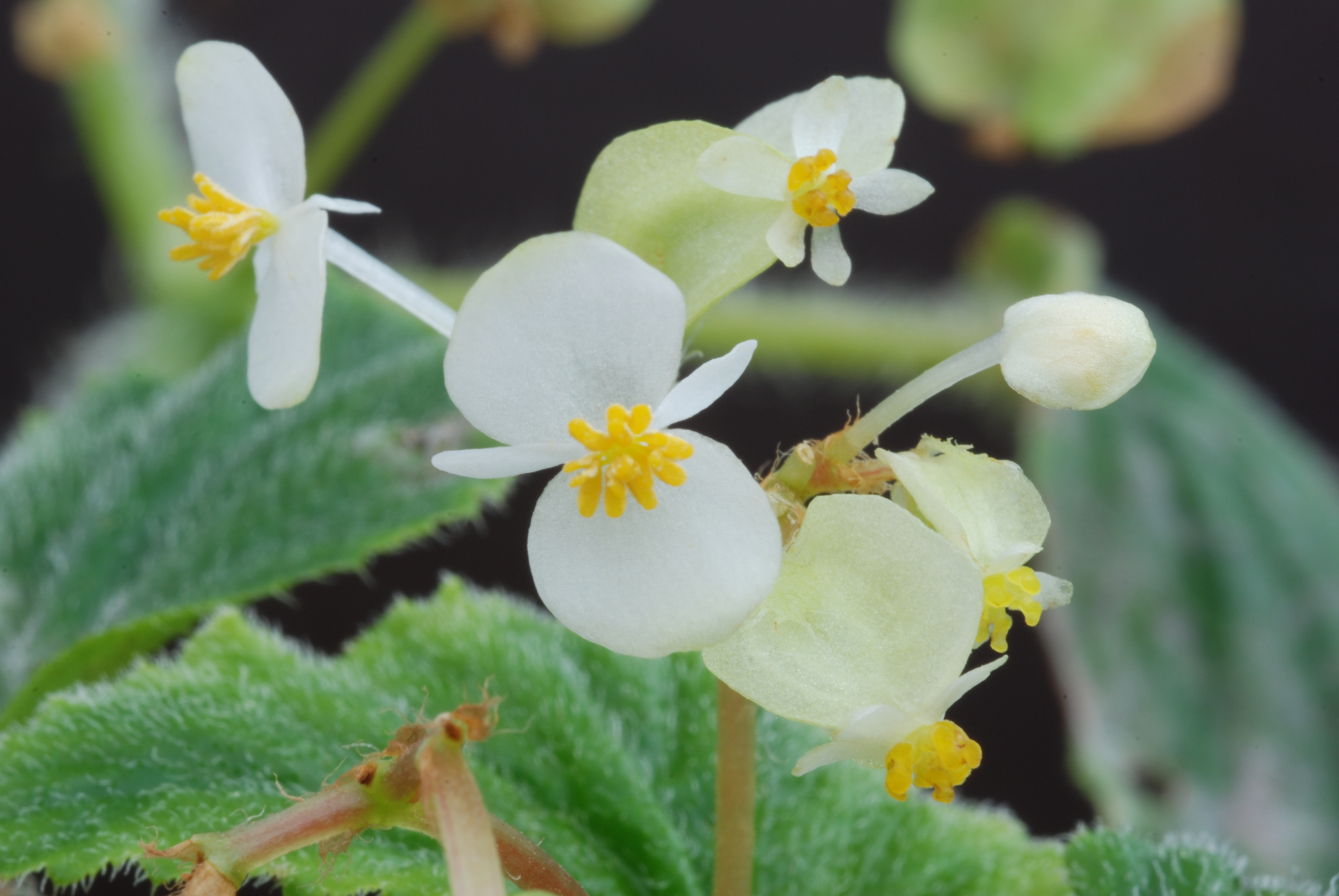
Close-up of flowers

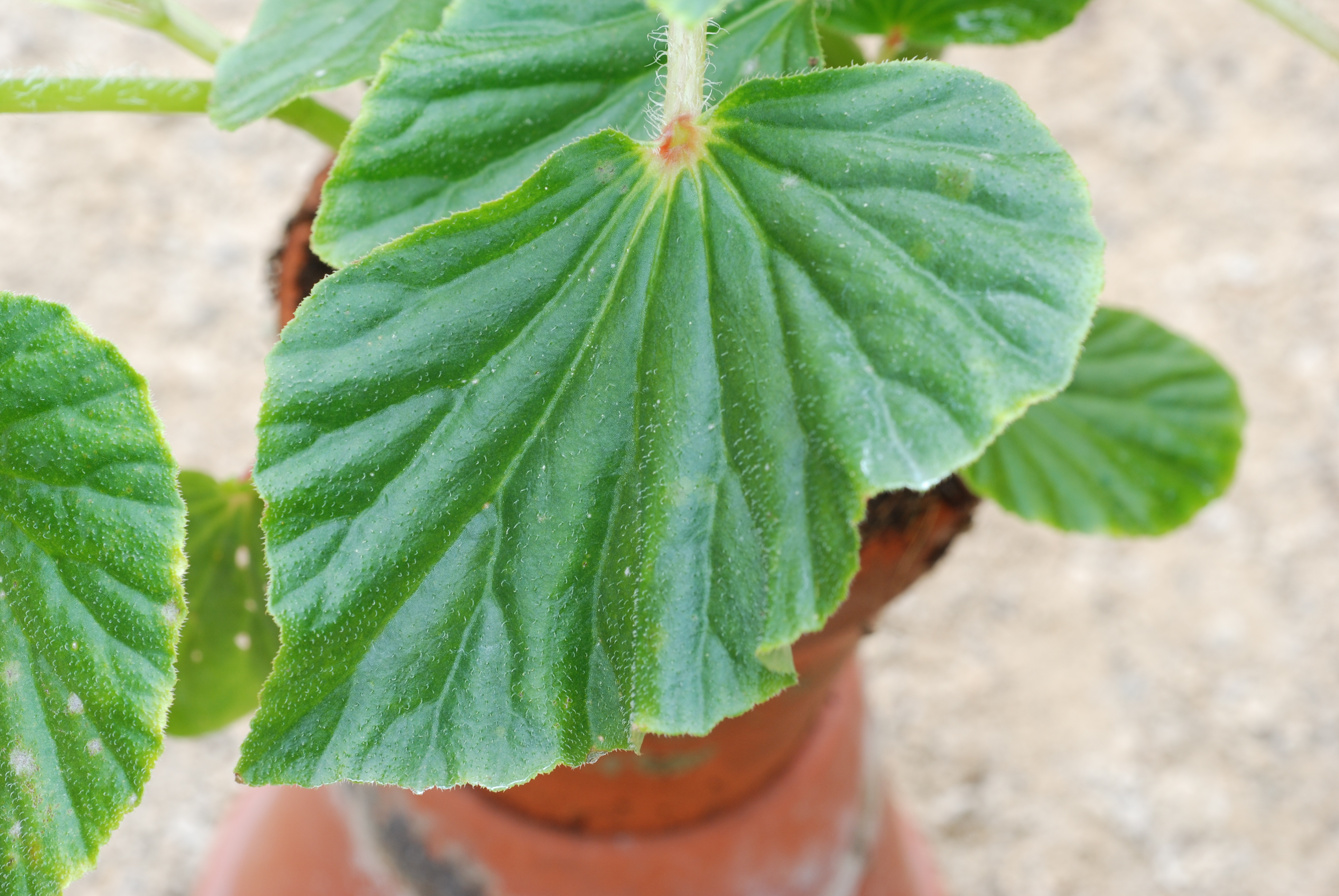
Leaf of a potted specimen

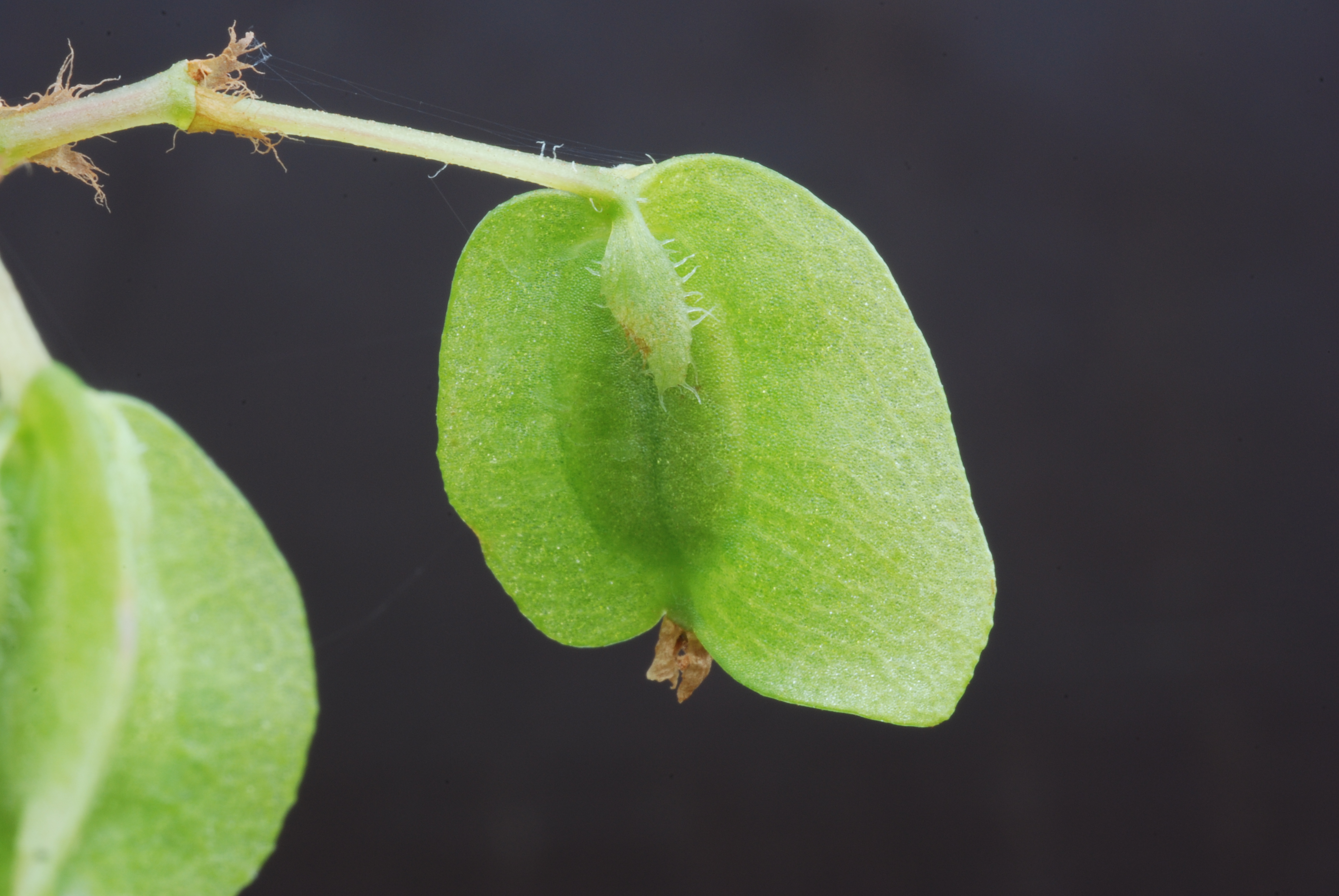
Seed capsule

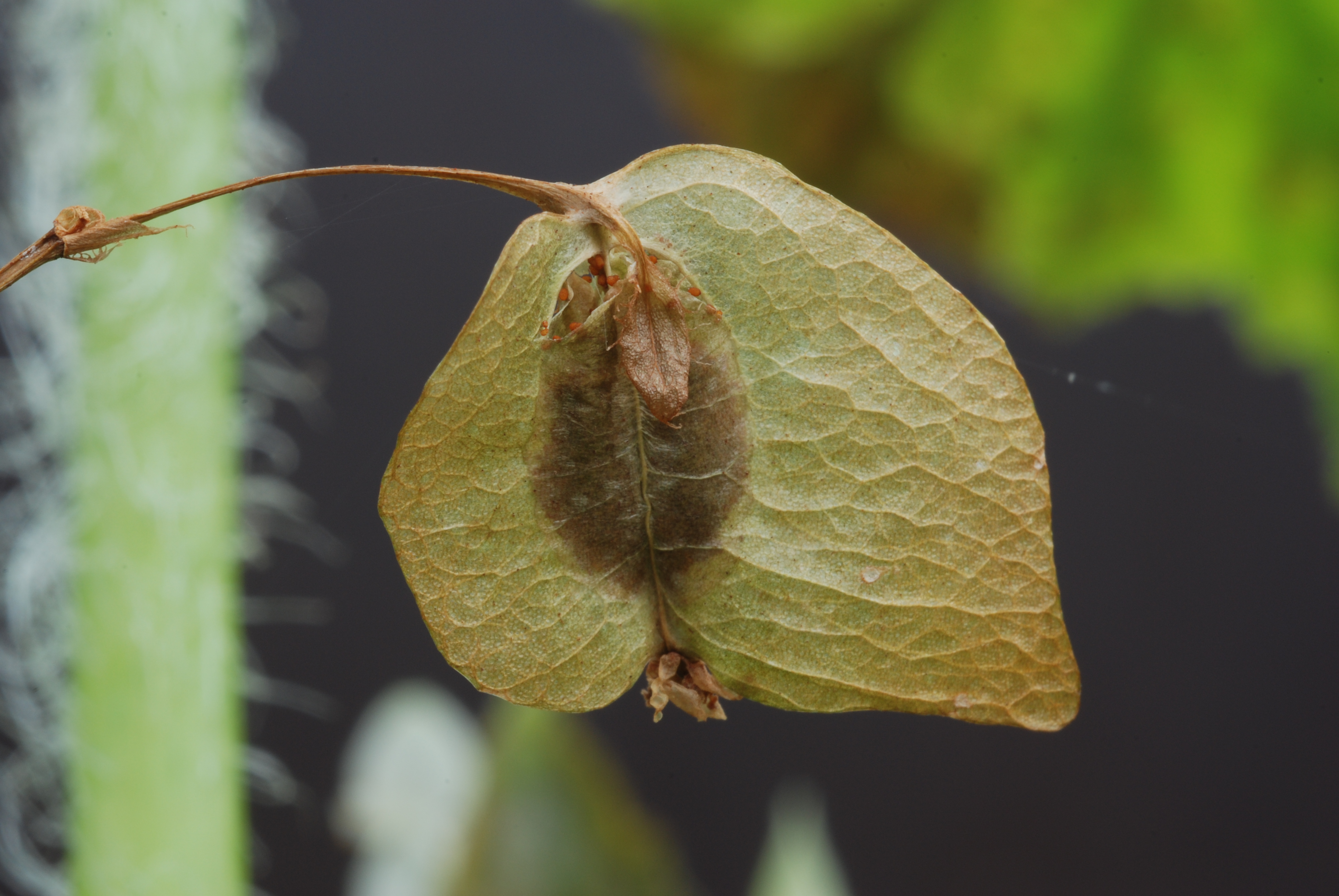
Ripe seed capsule
