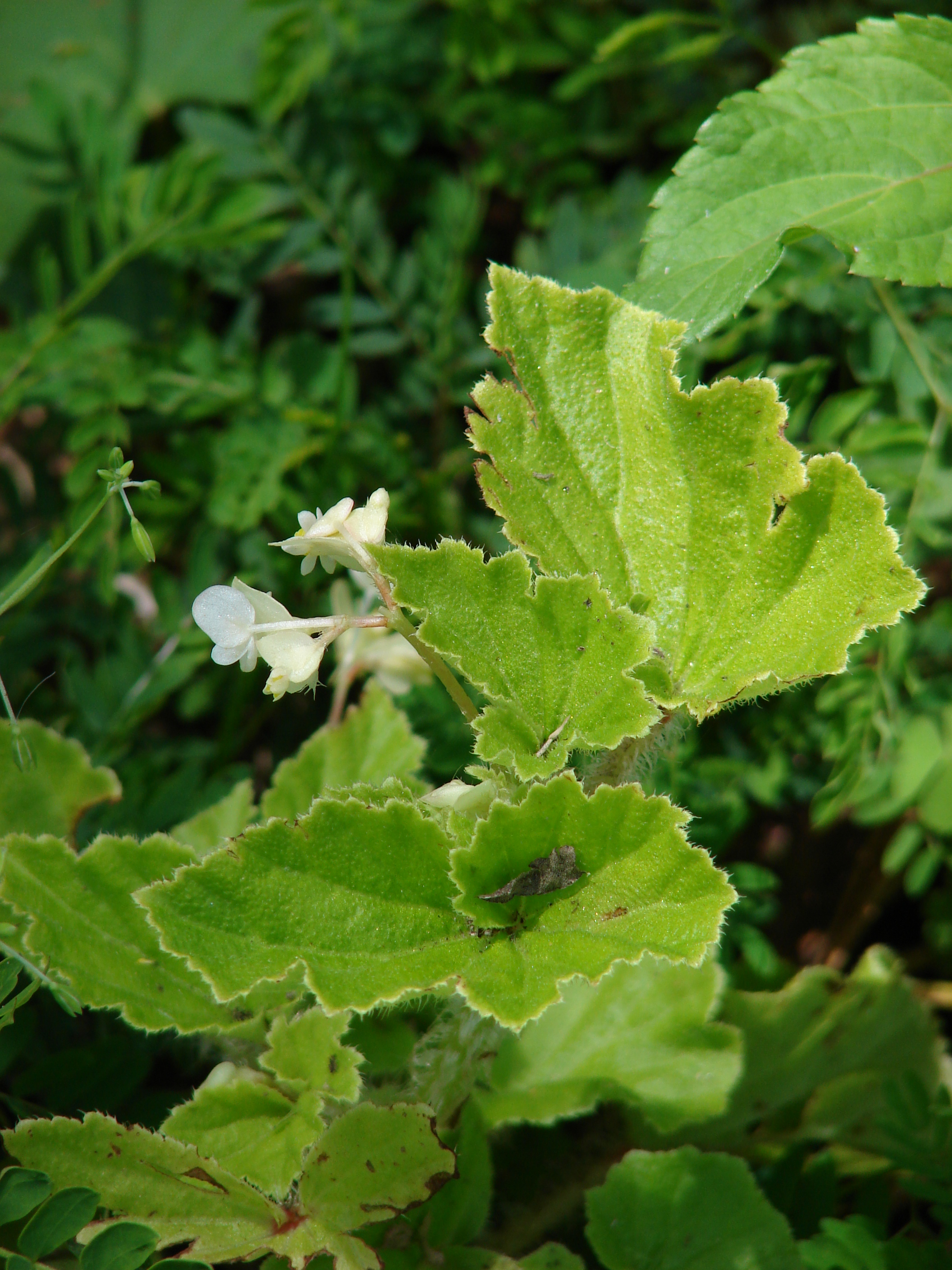
- Begonia hirtella

Scientific classification
- Kingdom: Plantae
- Clade: Tracheophytes
- Clade: Angiosperms
- Clade: Eudicots
- Clade: Rosids
- Order: Cucurbitales
- Family: Begoniaceae; C.Agardh

Genera
- Begonia; Hillebrandia
- Range of the family Begoniaceae

= Begoniaceae =

Family of flowering plants

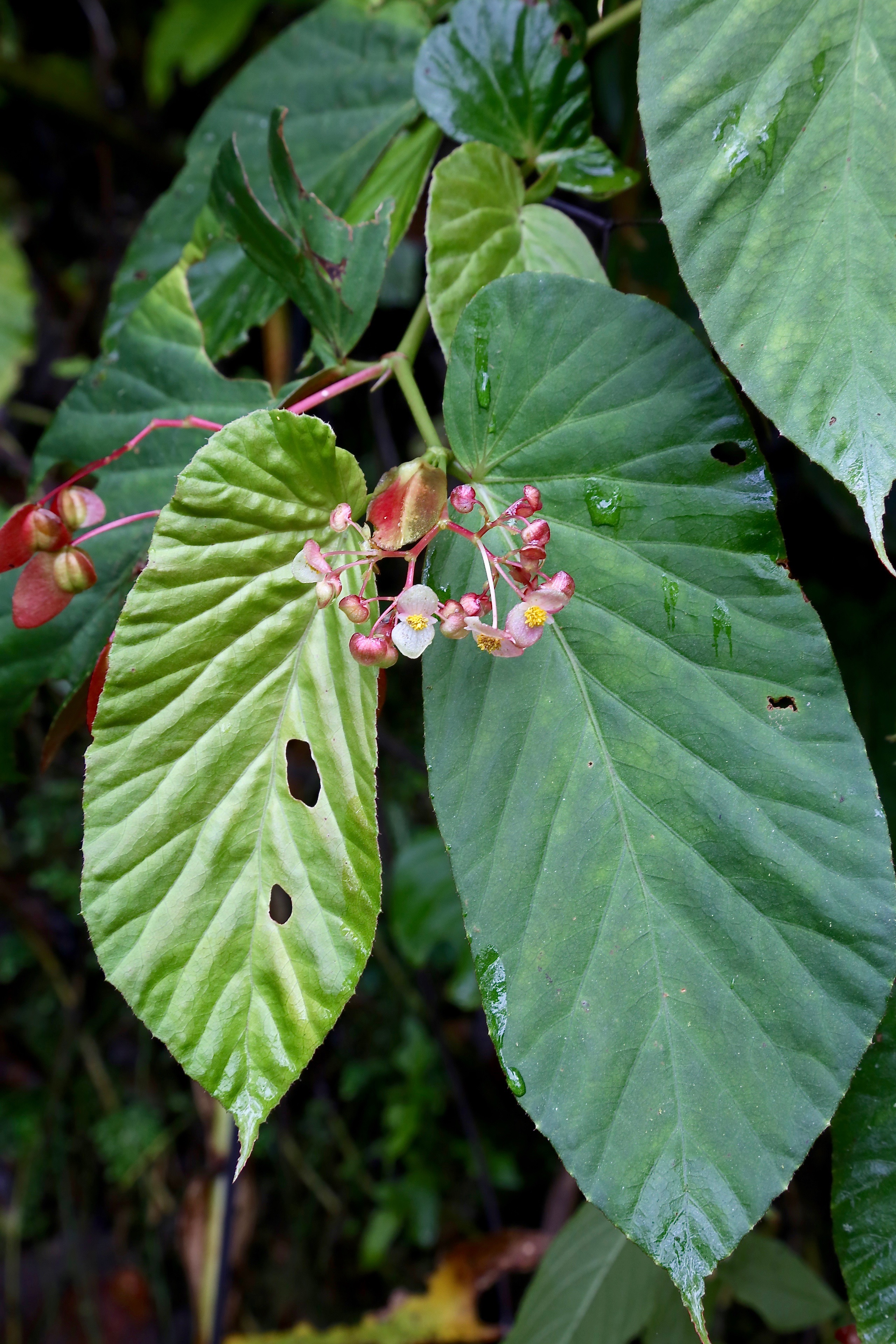
Begonia consobrina

Begoniaceae is a family of monoecious flowering plants with two genera and about 2040 species occurring in the subtropics and tropics of both the New World and Old World. All but one of the species are in the genus Begonia. The family is thought to have arisen in Africa and then dispersed to Asia and the Americas. There has been multiple studies on pollination mechanisms within the family that suggest deceit pollination although overall there is not much known about the pollination of most species. The only other genus in the family, Hillebrandia, is endemic to the Hawaiian Islands and has a single species. Phylogenetic work supports Hillebrandia as the sister taxon to the rest of the family. The genus Symbegonia was reduced to a section of Begonia in 2003, as molecular phylogenies had shown it to be derived from within that genus. Members of the genus Begonia are well-known and popular houseplants.

== Evolution ==
The origins of the family most likely reside in Africa from which it then spread to South East Asia, South and Central America. The plant also has characteristic variegation present on leaves which has been found to be caused by air pockets within the leaves themselves. This would usually mean less space for photosynthesis but the plant is able to make up for it by having cells adapted to produce more chloroplasts. This means there is no cost to the plant to have these patterns in terms of photosynthesis and light absorption. Although there is some loss of function within those regions the other portions make up for the loss

== Ecology ==
Most species pollination mechanisms are unknown but there have been studies showing that there are deceit pollinated species. Since most species do not have a reward for animal pollinators, it is thought that pollination occurs by accident and pollinators are deceived into thinking that they are visiting a reward (nectar, nest materials, scents used for mating) bearing flower.

Seed dispersal is most commonly seen using "rain-ballist" and animal dispersal mechanisms. These are thought to have evolved from wind dispersal mechanisms seen in older relatives of the family.

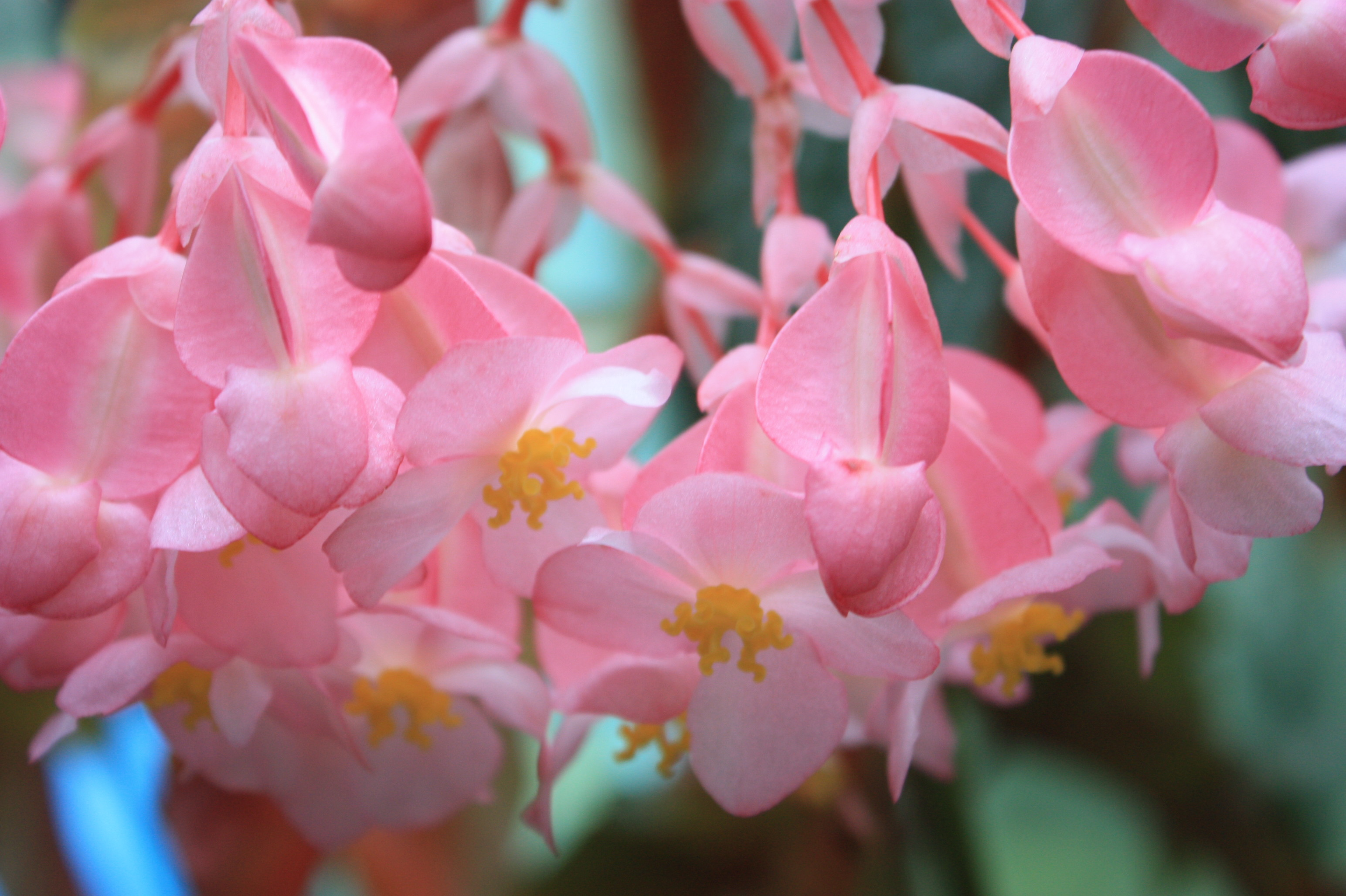
example of Begonia flowers

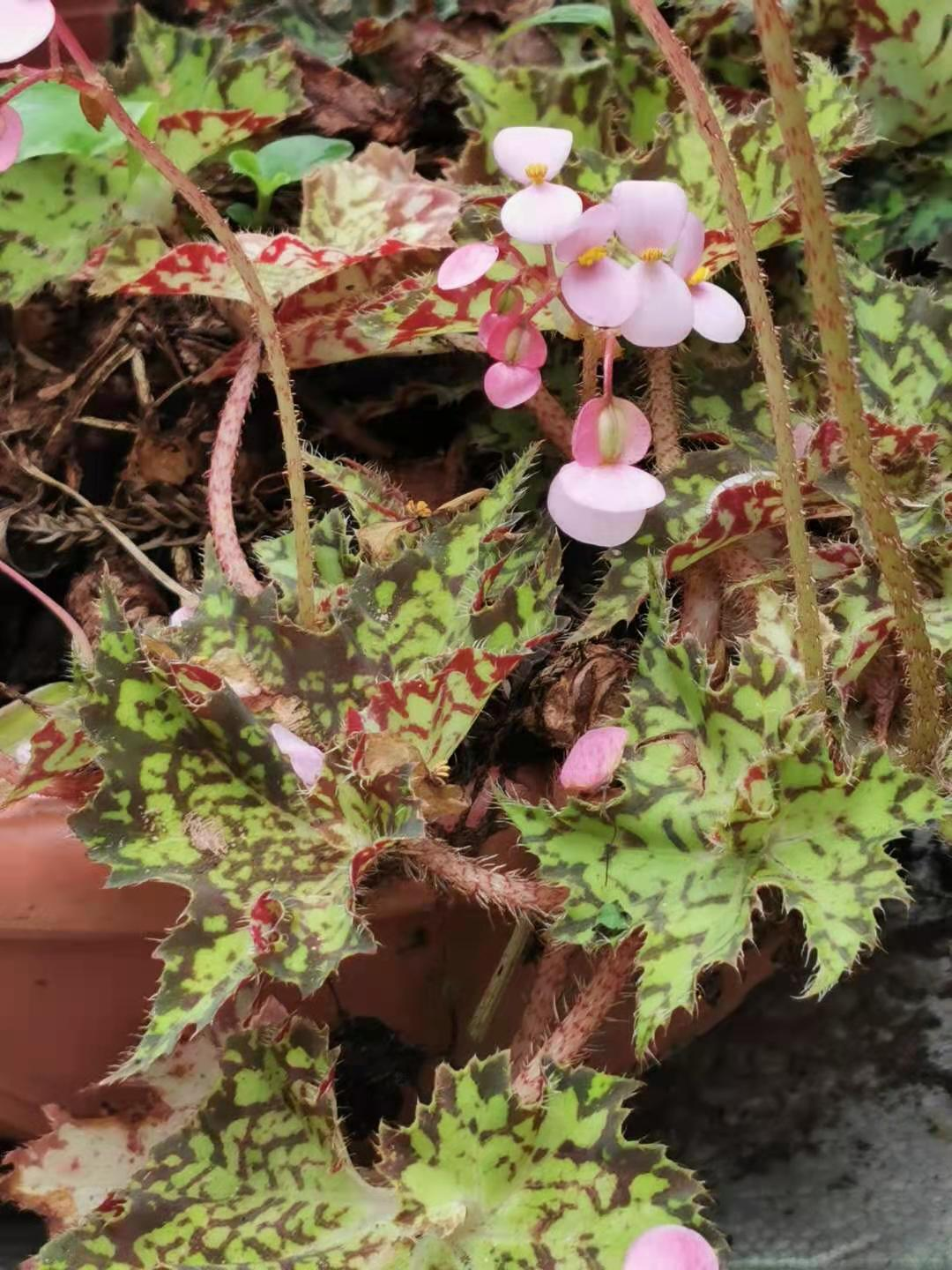
Begonia leaves are very varied in shape and varigation.

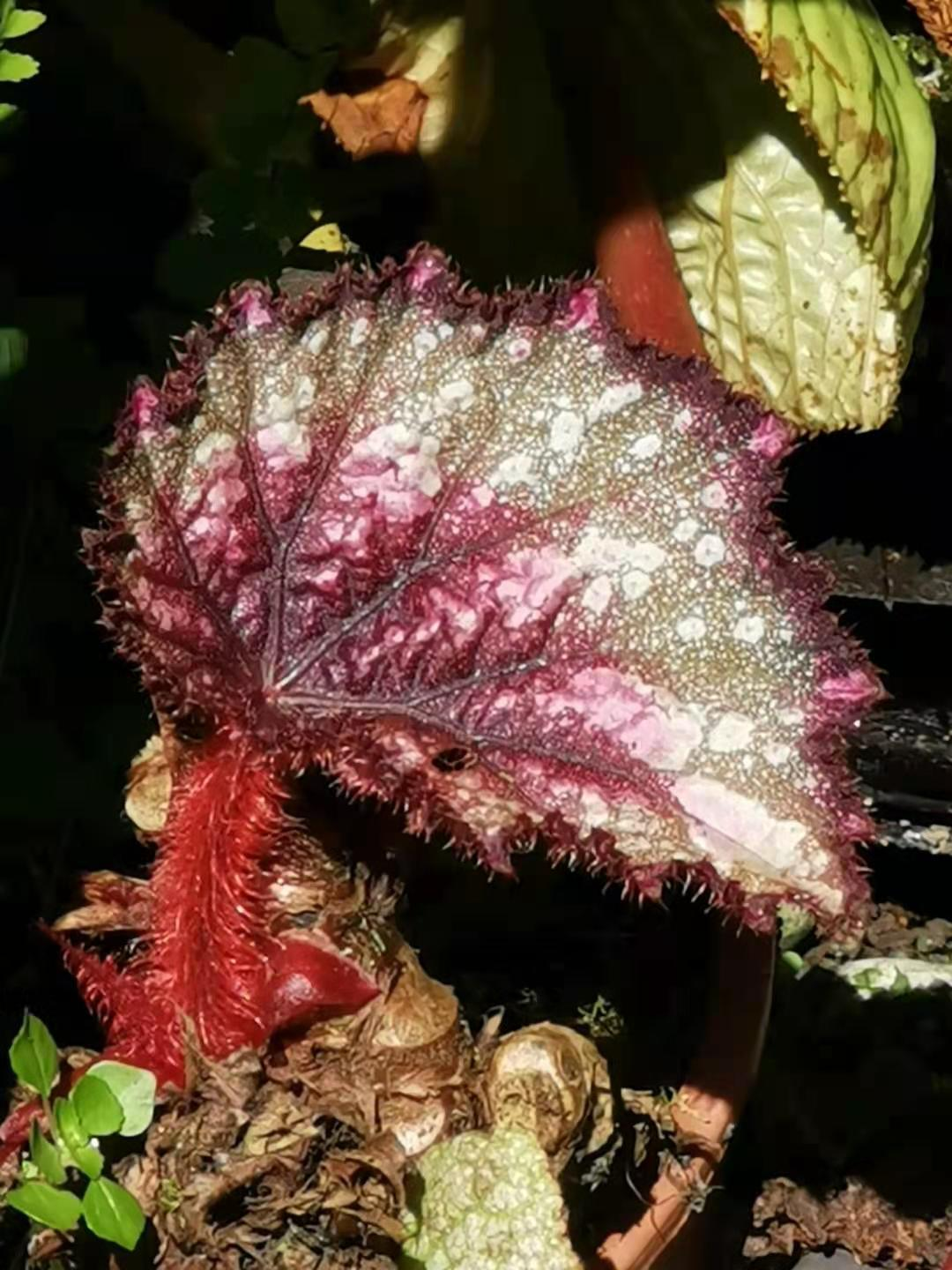
The plants of many species of Begonia are covered with fine hairs.

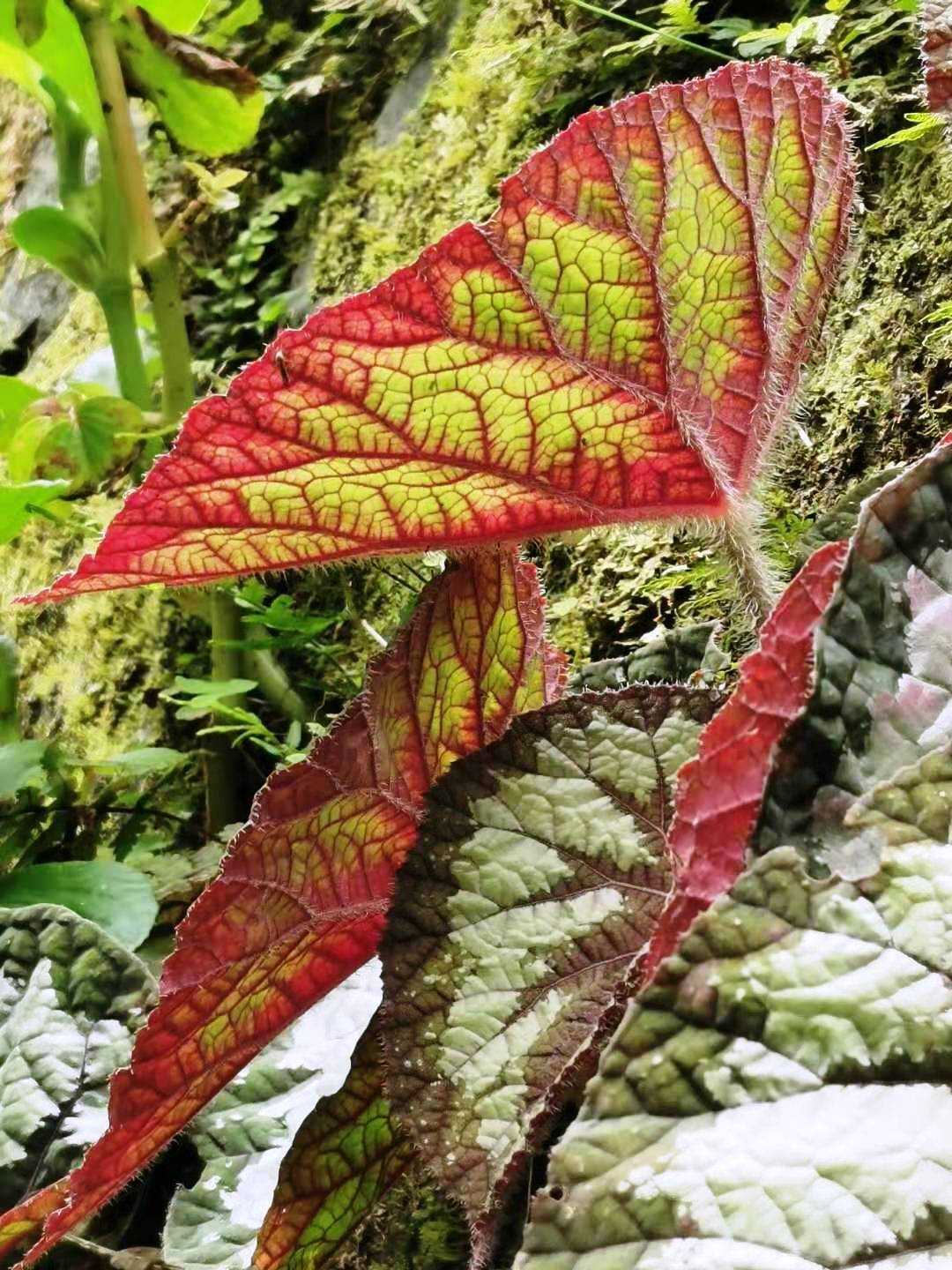
The back of the leaves is one of the key points to appreciate Begonia.

The back of the leaves is one of the key points to appreciate Begonia.

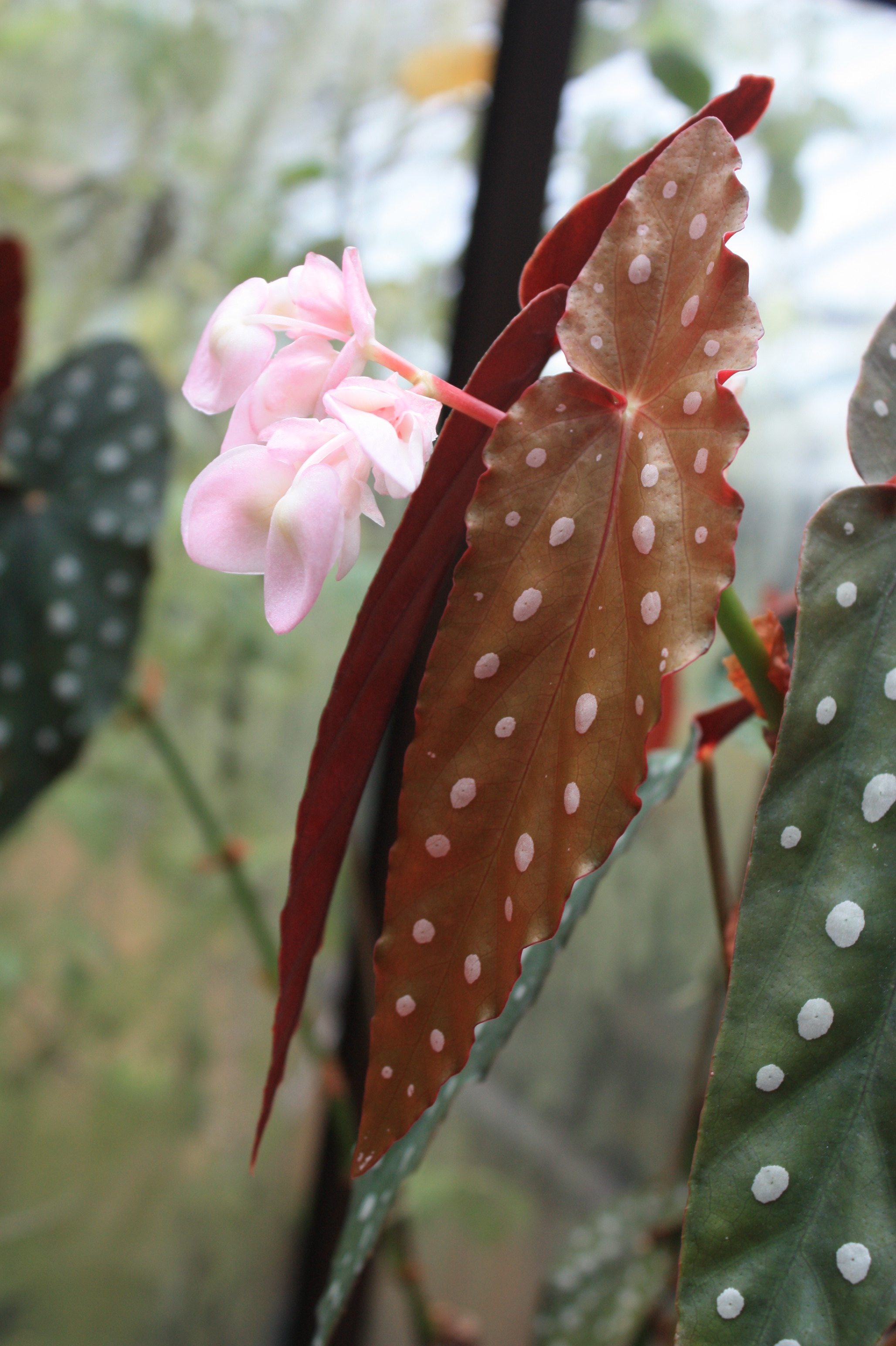
Begonia pseudolubbersii

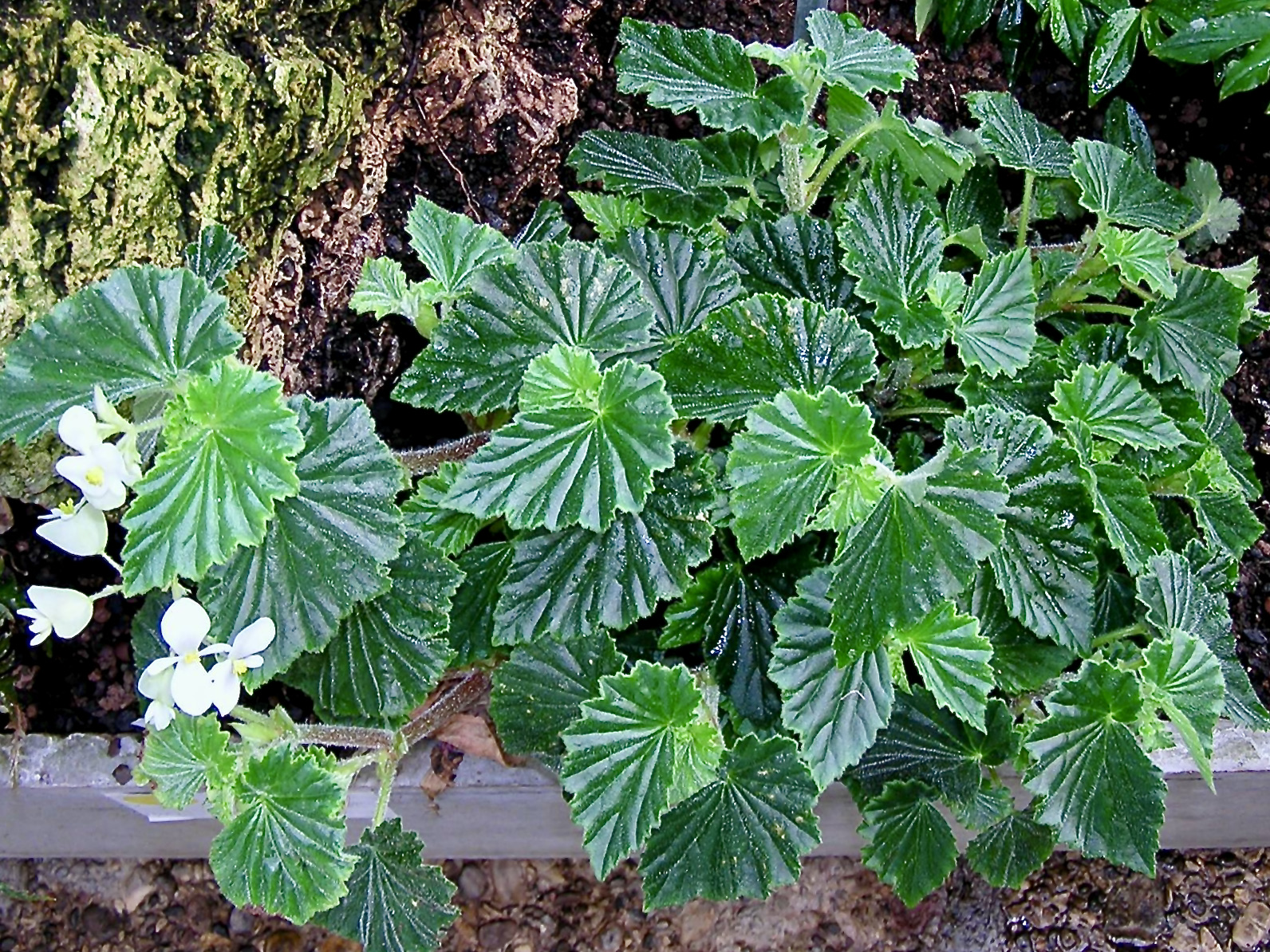
Begonia schmidtiana

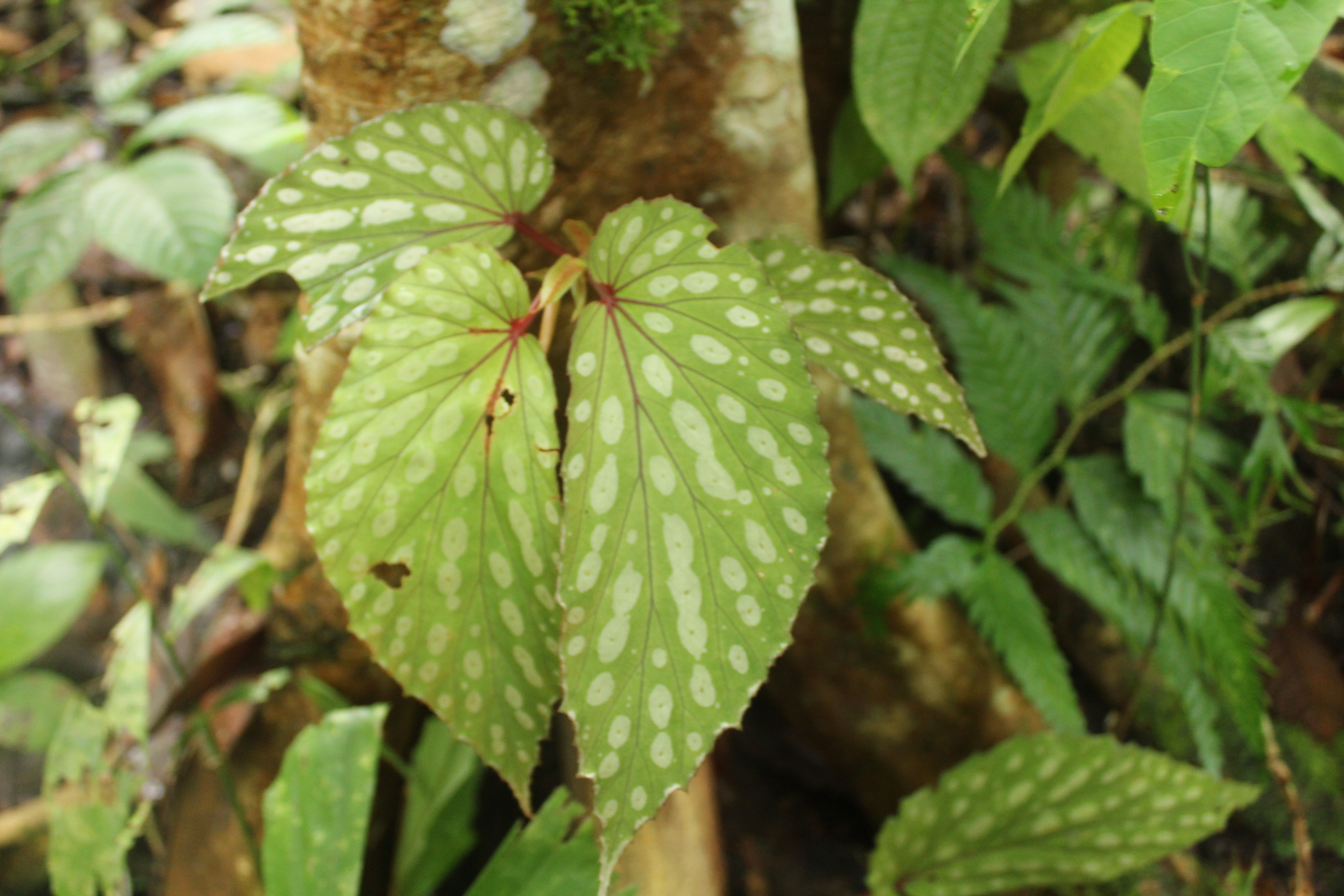
Example of Begoniaceae variegation

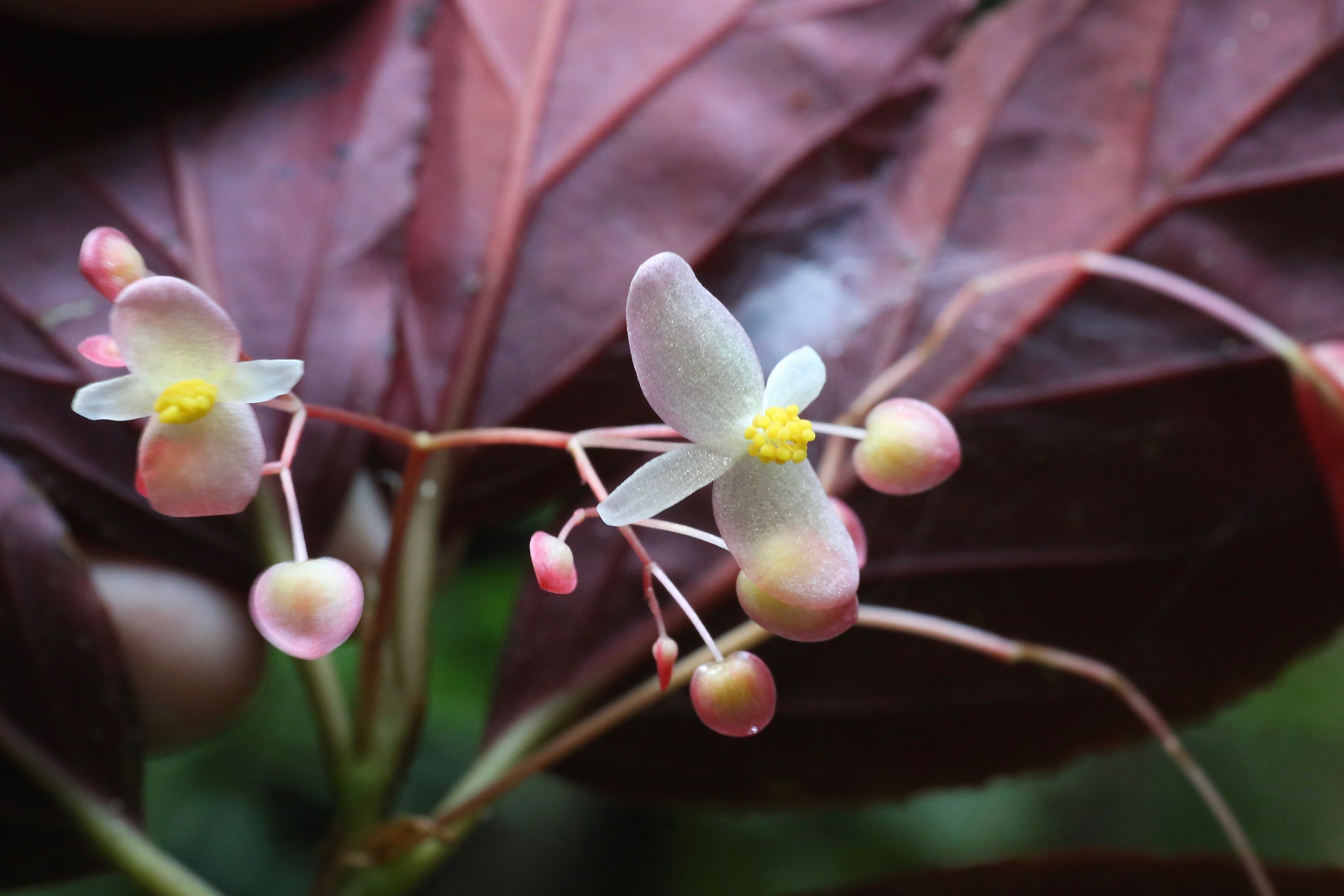
Begonia mayansis
