= List of Begonia species =

The following species are recognised in the genus Begonia:

== A ==
- Begonia abbottii Urb.
- Begonia abbreviata C.I Ping
- Begonia abdullahpieei Kiew
- Begonia aberrans Irmsch.
- Begonia abhak F.A Blasco, Alejandro, Tandang & Rubite
- Begonia aborensis Dunn
- Begonia acaulis Merr. & L.M.Perry
- Begonia acclivis Coyle
- Begonia acerifolia Kunth
- Begonia acetosa Vell.
- Begonia acetosella Craib
- Begonia acida Vell.
- Begonia acidulenta S.Julia & Kiew
- Begonia aconitifolia A.DC.
- Begonia acuminatissima Merr.
- Begonia acutifolia Jacq.
- Begonia acutiloba Liebm.
- Begonia acutis Y.M.Shui, W.H.Chen &H.Q.Nguyen
- Begonia acutitepala K.Y.Guan & D.K.Tian
- Begonia adamsensis Magtoto & Rubite
- Begonia addrinii S.Julia & Kiew
- Begonia adenodes Irmsch.
- Begonia adenopoda Lem.
- Begonia adenostegia Stapf
- Begonia adliniana Rimi
- Begonia admirabilis Brade
- Begonia adpressa Sosef
- Begonia adscendens C.B.Clarke
- Begonia aenea Linden & André
- Begonia aequata A.Gray
- Begonia aequatoguineensis Sosef & Nguema
- Begonia aequatorialis L.B.Sm. & B.G.Schub.
- Begonia aequilateralis Irmsch.
- Begonia aeranthos L.B.Sm. & B.G.Schub.
- Begonia affinis Merr.
- Begonia afromigrata J.J.de Wilde
- Begonia aggeloptera N.Hallé
- Begonia aguabuenensis Burt-Utley & Utley
- Begonia aguiabrancensis L.Kollmann
- Begonia aguilariiJara & Zabala
- Begonia agusanensis Merr.
- Begonia ahooensis P.L.Sherpa, A.Pradhan & A.Chettri
- Begonia aiensis C. W. Lin & C.I Peng
- Begonia aikrono H.P.Wilson & Jimbo
- Begonia akaw Mansibang, Aumentado & Y.P.Ang
- Begonia aketajawensis Ardi & D.C.Thomas
- Begonia alabensis Kiew
- Begonia alba Merr.
- Begonia albidula Brade
- Begonia albobracteata Ridl.
- Begonia albococcinea Hook.
- Begonia albomaculata C.DC. ex Huber
- Begonia albopunctata Y.M.Shui, W.H.Chen & H.Q.Nguyen
- Begonia alcarrasica J.Sierra
- Begonia alchemilloides A.DC.
- Begonia algaia L.B.Sm. & Wassh.
- Begonia alice-clarkae Ziesenh.
- Begonia alicida C.B.Clarke
- Begonia almedana Burt-Utley & Utley
- Begonia alnifolia A.DC.
- Begonia alpina L.B.Sm. & Wassh.
- Begonia alta Aver.
- Begonia altimontana E.L.Jacques
- Begonia altissima Ridl.
- Begonia altoperuviana A.DC.
- Begonia alvarezii Merr.
- Begonia alveolata T.T.Yu
- Begonia amamampang Mazo & Rubite
- Begonia ambanizanensis Scherber. & Duruiss.
- Begonia ambodiforahensis Scherber. & Duruiss.
- Begonia amidalae C.W. Lin & C.I. Peng
- Begonia amnicola Y.H.Tan, M.B.Maw & H.B.Ding
- Begonia amoeboides Moonlight
- Begonia amparoae F.A.Blasco, Alejandro, Tandang & Rubite
- Begonia amphioxus Sands
- Begonia ampla Hook.f.
- Begonia anaimalaiensis Bedd.
- Begonia andamensis Parish ex C.B.Clarke
- Begonia andersonii Kiew & S.Julia
- Begonia andina Rusby
- Begonia androrangensis Humbert
- Begonia androturba Coyle
- Begonia anemoniflora Irmsch.
- Begonia angilogensis Merr.
- Begonia angolensis Irmsch.
- Begonia angularis Raddi
- Begonia angulata Vell.
- Begonia angustibracteata D.K.Tian & R.C.Hu
- Begonia angustilimba Merr.
- Begonia angustiloba A.DC.
- Begonia anisoptera Merr.
- Begonia anisosepala Hook.f.
- Begonia anjuanensis Humbert ex Aymonin & Bosser
- Begonia ankaranensis Humbert ex Aymonin & Bosser
- Begonia annobonensis A.DC.
- Begonia annulata K.Koch
- Begonia anodifolia A.DC.
- Begonia anserina C.W.Lin & C.I Peng
- Begonia antaisaka Humbert
- Begonia anthonyi (A.DC.) Warb.
- Begonia antioquensis Kiew
- Begonia antongilensis Humbert
- Begonia antonietae Brade
- Begonia antsingyensis Humbert ex Aymonin & Bosser
- Begonia antsiranensis Aymonin & Bosser
- Begonia apayaoensis Merr.
- Begonia apiensis Kiew & S.Julia
- Begonia apparicioi Brade
- Begonia aptera Blume
- Begonia aquaticaritata S.S.Ying
- Begonia arachnoidea C.I Peng, Yan Liu & S.M.Ku
- Begonia araneumoides Ardi & Girm.
- Begonia arauensis M.Hughes
- Begonia arborescens Raddi
- Begonia archboldiana Merr. & L.M.Perry
- Begonia areolata Miq.
- Begonia arfakensis (Gibbs) L.L.Forrest & Hollingsw.
- Begonia argentea Linden
- Begonia argenteomarginata Tebbitt
- Begonia argentii Kiew & S.Julia
- Begonia aridicaulis Ziesenh.
- Begonia aristata Blasco, Alejandro, & Rubite
- Begonia armykapii S.Julia & C.Y.Ling
- Begonia arnottiana (Wight) A.DC.
- Begonia arol-lanoensis C.Y.Ling & S.Julia
- Begonia arrogans Irmsch.
- Begonia articulata Irmsch.
- Begonia artior Irmsch.
- Begonia arunachalensis D.Borah & Wahlsteen
- Begonia asaroensis J.N.Gagul
- Begonia asperifolia Irmsch.
- Begonia aspersa Aver., Nuraliev & Y.M.Shui
- Begonia aspleniifolia Hook.f. ex A.DC.
- Begonia assurgens Irmsch. ex Weberling
- Begonia asteroides L.B.Sm. & B.G.Schub.
- Begonia asteropyrifolia Y.M.Shui & W.H.Chen
- Begonia atlantica M.D.Miranda & E.L.Jacques
- Begonia atricha (Miq.) Miq. ex A.DC.
- Begonia atrofusca Wahlsteen & D.Borah
- Begonia atroglandulosa Sosef
- Begonia augustae Irmsch.
- Begonia augustinei Hemsl.
- Begonia aurantiiflora C.I Peng, Yan Liu & S.M.Ku
- Begonia auriculata Hook.f.
- Begonia auritalata D.K.Tian & H.J.Wei
- Begonia auritistipula Y.M.Shui & W.H.Chen
- Begonia aurora C.I Peng, Yan Liu & W.B.Xu
- Begonia austroguangxiensis Y.M.Shui & W.H.Chen
- Begonia austrotaiwanensis Y.K.Chen & C.I.Peng
- Begonia austrovietnamica C.I Peng, C.W.Lin, D.D.Nguyen & N.D. Truong
- Begonia austroyunnanensis W.G.Wang, H.C.Xi & J.Y.Shen
- Begonia awongii Sands
- Begonia axillaris Ridl.
- Begonia axillipara Ridl.
- Begonia azuensis Urb. & Ekman

== B ==
- Begonia babeana Aver. & H.Q.Nguyen
- Begonia baccata Hook.f.
- Begonia bachmaensis Y.M.Shui & T.T.D.Pham
- Begonia bachulkarii Aitawade, Kattuk. & S.R.Yadav
- Begonia bacmeensis V.T.Pham & C.W.Lin
- Begonia bacsonensis D.K.Tian, T.S.Hoang & B.Chen
- Begonia bagotiana Humbert ex Aymonin & Bosser
- Begonia bahakensis Sands
- Begonia bahiensis A.DC.
- Begonia baik C.W.Lin & C.I Peng
- Begonia baikoides S.Julia & C.Y.Ling
- Begonia baishishanensis R.C.Hu & D.K.Tian
- Begonia bajik S.Julia & C.Y.Ling
- Begonia bakunensis S.Julia
- Begonia balangcodiae Rubite, S.H.Liu & K.F.Chung
- Begonia balansae C.DC.
- Begonia balansana Gagnep.
- Begonia balgooyi D.C.Thomas & Ardi
- Begonia baliensis Girm.
- Begonia balmisiana Balmis
- Begonia bamaensis Yan Liu & C.I Peng
- Begonia bambusetorum H.Q.Nguyen, Y.M.Shui & W.H.Chen
- Begonia banaoensis J.Sierra
- Begonia bangii Kuntze
- Begonia bangsamoro D.P.Buenavista
- Begonia barahonensis (O.E.Schulz) Urb.
- Begonia baramensis Merr.
- Begonia barbellata Ridl.
- Begonia barkeri Knowles & Westc.
- Begonia barkleyana L.B.Sm.
- Begonia baronii Baker
- Begonia barosma X.X.Feng, Y.N.Huang & Z.X.Liu
- Begonia barrigae L.B.Sm. & B.G.Schub.
- Begonia barsalouxiae Standl. & L.O.Williams
- Begonia bartlettiana Merr. & L.M.Perry
- Begonia basintaliana Rimi
- Begonia bataiensis Kiew
- Begonia batuphila Girm.
- Begonia baturongensis Kiew
- Begonia batusangiensis Ardi & D.C.Thomas
- Begonia baviensis Gagnep.
- Begonia bawangensis Girm., Randi & M.Hughes
- Begonia bayae S.Julia & Kiew
- Begonia bazhaiensis W.G.Wang & R.K.Li
- Begonia beccariana Ridl.
- Begonia beddomei Hook.f.
- Begonia beijneniiY.P.Ang, Tandang, Rubite & R.A.Bustam.
- Begonia bekakapensis C.Y.Ling & S.Julia
- Begonia bekopakensis Aymonin & Bosser
- Begonia belagaensis S.Julia
- Begonia bella Phutthai
- Begonia beludruvenea M.Hughes
- Begonia benaratensis S.Julia
- Begonia bengohensis S.Julia
- Begonia benitotanii Rubite, Tandang & C.W.Lin
- Begonia bequaertii Robyns & Lawalrée
- Begonia berhamanii Kiew
- Begonia beringii Mazo, Salatan & Rubite
- Begonia bernadusii Guanih
- Begonia bernicei Aymard & G.A.Romero
- Begonia bernieri A.DC.
- Begonia beryllae Ridl.
- Begonia besleriifolia Schott
- Begonia bessangpassensis Calaramo, Rubite & C.W.Lin
- Begonia betancurii Jara & Moonlight
- Begonia betsimisaraka Humbert
- Begonia bettinae Ziesenh.
- Begonia bhutanensis P.Gyeltshen & M.Hughes
- Begonia bidentata Raddi
- Begonia biflora T.C.Ku
- Begonia bifolia Ridl.
- Begonia bifurcata L.B.Sm. & B.G.Schub.
- Begonia biguassuensis Brade
- Begonia bijantiae D.Borah, Taram & M.Hughes
- Begonia biliranensis Merr.
- Begonia bimaensis Undaharta & Ardaka
- Begonia bintang Rimi
- Begonia binuangensis Merr.
- Begonia bipinnatifida J.J.Sm.
- Begonia biserrata Lindl.
- Begonia bissei J.Sierra
- Begonia blaan Naive
- Begonia blancii M.Hughes & C.I Peng
- Begonia bogneri Ziesenh.
- Begonia boisiana Gagnep.
- Begonia boissieri A.DC.
- Begonia boiviniana A.DC.
- Begonia boliviensis A.DC.
- Begonia bolleana Urb. & Ekman
- Begonia bonii Gagnep.
- Begonia bonitoensis Brade
- Begonia bonthainensis Hemsl.
- Begonia bonus-henricus J.J.de Wilde
- Begonia boqueronensis Burt-Utley & Utley
- Begonia boraceiensis Handro
- Begonia boreoharlingii Moonlight & Tebbitt
- Begonia borneensis A.DC.
- Begonia bosseri Keraudren
- Begonia bosuangiana S.Julia
- Begonia botryoides Moonlight & Tebbitt
- Begonia boucheana (Klotzsch) A.DC.
- Begonia bouffordii C.I Peng
- Begonia bowerae Ziesenh.
- Begonia brachybotrys Merr. & L.M.Perry
- Begonia brachyclada Urb. & Ekman
- Begonia brachypoda O.E.Schulz
- Begonia bracteata Jack
- Begonia bracteolata N.Krishna, Pradeep & B.Mani
- Begonia bracteosa A.DC.
- Begonia bradei Irmsch.
- Begonia brandbygeana L.B.Sm. & Wassh.
- Begonia brandisiana Kurz
- Begonia brangbosangensis Girm.
- Begonia brassii Merr. & L.M.Perry
- Begonia breedlovei Burt-Utley
- Begonia brevibracteata Kupicha
- Begonia brevicaulis A.DC.
- Begonia brevicordata L.B.Sm. & B.G.Schub.
- Begonia brevilobata Irmsch.
- Begonia brevipedunculata Y.M.Shui
- Begonia brevipes Merr.
- Begonia brevipetala (A.DC.) Warb.
- Begonia brevirimosa Irmsch.
- Begonia × breviscapa C.I Peng, Yan Liu & S.M.Ku
- Begonia brevisetulosa C.Y.Wu
- Begonia bridgesii A.DC.
- Begonia broussonetiifolia A.DC.
- Begonia bruneiana Sands
- Begonia brunneosquamata Phonep. & C.W.Lin
- Begonia buchtienii Irmsch.
- Begonia buddleiifolia A.DC.
- Begonia bufoderma L.B.Sm. & Wassh.
- Begonia × buimontana Yamam.
- Begonia bukitrayaensis Randi & Mustaqim
- Begonia bulbillifera Link & Otto
- Begonia bullata Urb. & Ekman
- Begonia bullatifolia L.Kollmann
- Begonia burabod Rubite, C.Justo, P.Villaseñor & C.W.Lin
- Begonia burbidgei Stapf
- Begonia burkillii Dunn
- Begonia burmensis L.B.Sm. & Wassh.
- Begonia burttii Kiew & S.Julia
- Begonia buseyi Burt-Utley
- Begonia butuanensis Bucay, Tandang & K.F.Chung

== C ==
- Begonia cabanillasii Y.P.Ang, Tandang, J.Agcaoili & R.A.Bustam
- Begonia cacauicola L.B.Sm. ex S.F.Sm. & Wassh.
- Begonia caespitosa Jack
- Begonia calcarea Ridl.
- Begonia calcicola Merr.
- Begonia calciphila C.I Peng
- Begonia calderonii Standl.
- Begonia calliantha Merr. & L.M.Perry
- Begonia callistemon Tebbitt & P.R.Stevenson
- Begonia callosa L.Kollmann
- Begonia calvescens (Brade ex L.B.Sm. & R.C.Sm.) E.L.Jacques & Mamede
- Begonia calzadae Burt-Utley & Utley
- Begonia camiguinensis Elmer
- Begonia campanensis Burt-Utley & Utley
- Begonia camposportoana Brade
- Begonia camugao Bucay, Tandang & K.F.Chung
- Begonia canaliculata Brade
- Begonia candollei Ziesenh.
- Begonia cangyuanensis Y.H.Tan & H.B.Ding
- Begonia caobangensis C.I Peng & C.W.Lin
- Begonia capanemae Brade
- Begonia caparaoensis E.L.Jacques & L.Kollmann
- Begonia capensis L.f.
- Begonia capillipes Gilg
- Begonia capituliformis Irmsch.
- Begonia caraguatatubensis Rubite, R.R., M. Irabagon, D. Palacio, Y.P.Ang, & R.Bustam.
- Begonia caramoanensis Brade
- Begonia cardiocarpa Liebm.
- Begonia cardiophora Irmsch.
- Begonia cariocana Brade ex L.B.Sm. & Wassh.
- Begonia carletonii Standl.
- Begonia carnosa Teijsm. & Binn.
- Begonia carnosula Ridl.
- Begonia carolineifolia Regel
- Begonia carpinifolia Liebm.
- Begonia carrieae Ziesenh.
- Begonia caryotarum Y.M.Shui & W.H.Chen
- Begonia casiguranensis Quisumb. & Merr.
- Begonia castaneifolia Otto & Dietr.
- Begonia casseabri Y.H.Tan, M.B.Maw & H.B.Ding
- Begonia castilloi Merr.
- Begonia castrosouzae L.Kollmann
- Begonia cataracta Souvann., Lanors. & Lamxay
- Begonia catbensis L.N.Dong, K.S.Nguyen & Y.M.Shui
- Begonia catharinensis Brade
- Begonia cathayana Hemsl.
- Begonia cathcartii Hook.f. & Thomson
- Begonia caudata Merr.
- Begonia cauliflora Sands
- Begonia cavaleriei H.Lév.
- Begonia cavallyensis A.Chev.
- Begonia cavum Ziesenh.
- Begonia cebadillensis Houghton ex L.B.Sm. & Schub.
- Begonia cehengensis T.C.Ku
- Begonia celata S.Julia & Kiew
- Begonia celebica Irmsch.
- Begonia ceratocarpa S.H.Huang & Y.M.Shui
- Begonia chaiana Kiew & S.Julia
- Begonia chakensis S.Julia & C.Y.Ling
- Begonia chambersiae W.N.Takeuchi
- Begonia charlesjarosiana L.Kollmann
- Begonia chemillenensis Moonlight
- Begonia chiapensis Burt-Utley
- Begonia chiasmogyna M.Hughes
- Begonia chindwinensis Y.H.Tan, M.B.Maw & H.B.Ding
- Begonia chingguoliaoensis S.S.Ying
- Begonia chingii Irmsch.
- Begonia chingipengii Rubite
- Begonia chishuiensis T.C.Ku
- Begonia chitoensis Tang S.Liu & M.J.Lai
- Begonia chivatoa Ziesenh.
- Begonia chlorandra Sands
- Begonia chlorocarpa Irmsch. ex Sands
- Begonia chlorolepis L.B.Sm. & B.G.Schub.
- Begonia chloroneura P.Wilkie & Sands
- Begonia chlorosticta Sands
- Begonia choiseulensis C.W.Lin
- Begonia chongii Sands
- Begonia chongzuoensis Yan Liu, S.M.Ku & C.I Peng
- Begonia chrysantha Tebbitt
- Begonia × chungii C.I Peng & S.M.Ku
- Begonia chuniana C.Y.Wu
- Begonia chunxiuensis W.G.Wang, D.K.Tian, R.K.Li & H.C.Xi
- Begonia chuyunshanensis C.I Peng & Y.K.Chen
- Begonia ciliatifolia Funez & J.C.Jaramillo
- Begonia ciliifera Merr.
- Begonia ciliobracteata Warb.
- Begonia cincinnifera Irmsch.
- Begonia cinnabarina Hook.
- Begonia circularis C.I Peng & C.W.Lin
- Begonia circumlobata Hance
- Begonia cirrosa L.B.Sm. & Wassh.
- Begonia cladocarpoides Humbert ex Aymonin & Bosser
- Begonia cladotricha M.Hughes
- Begonia clavicaulis Irmsch.
- Begonia clemensiae Merr. & L.M.Perry
- Begonia cleopatrae Coyle
- Begonia clypeifolia Hook.f.
- Begonia coccinea Hook.
- Begonia cochlearis S.S.Ying
- Begonia coelocentroides Y.M.Shui & Z.D.Wei
- Begonia cognata Irmsch.
- Begonia collaris Brade
- Begonia colliculata Souvann. & Lanors.
- Begonia collisiae Merr.
- Begonia colombiana L.B.Sm. & B.G.Schub.
- Begonia colorata Warb.
- Begonia comata Kuntze
- Begonia comestibilis D.C.Thomas & Ardi
- Begonia comorensis Warb.
- Begonia compacta S.Julia & Kiew
- Begonia compacticaulis Irmsch.
- Begonia concanensis A.DC.
- Begonia conchifolia A.Dietr.
- Begonia concinna Schott
- Begonia condorensis Jara & Moonlight
- Begonia confinis L.B.Sm. & Wassh.
- Begonia confusa L.B.Sm. & B.G.Schub.
- Begonia congesta Ridl.
- Begonia conipila Irmsch. ex Kiew
- Begonia conniegeriae S.Julia & Kiew
- Begonia consanguinea Merr.
- Begonia consobrina Irmsch.
- Begonia contracta Warb.
- Begonia convallariodora C.DC.
- Begonia convolvulacea (Klotzsch) A.DC.
- Begonia cooperi C.DC.
- Begonia copelandii Merr.
- Begonia copeyana C.DC.
- Begonia coptidifolia H.G.Ye, F.G.Wang, Y.S.Ye & C.I Peng
- Begonia coptidimontana C.Y.Wu
- Begonia corallina Carrière
- Begonia corazoniae Naive
- Begonia cordata Vell.
- Begonia cordifolia (Wight) Thwaites
- Begonia cordillerae Tebbitt
- Begonia coriacea Hassk.
- Begonia corneri Kiew
- Begonia cornitepala Irmsch.
- Begonia cornuta L.B.Sm. & B.G.Schub.
- Begonia coronensis Merr.
- Begonia corredorana C.DC.
- Begonia corrugata Kiew & S.Julia
- Begonia corzoensis Ziesenh.
- Begonia coursii Humbert ex Aymonin
- Begonia cowellii Nash
- Begonia crassa S.Julia & Kiew
- Begonia crassicaulis Lindl.
- Begonia crassitepala Y.H.Tan & M.B.Maw
- Begonia crassula Aver.
- Begonia crateris Exell
- Begonia cremnophila Tebbitt
- Begonia crenata Dryand.
- Begonia crispipila Elmer
- Begonia crispula Brade
- Begonia cristobalensis Ziesenh.
- Begonia croatii Burt-Utley
- Begonia crocea C.I Peng
- Begonia crockerensis Rimi
- Begonia cruentospirituna C.W.Lin
- Begonia cryptocarpa L.B.Sm. & B.G.Schub.
- Begonia crystallina Y.M.Shui & W.H.Chen
- Begonia cuatrecasasiana L.B.Sm. & B.G.Schub.
- Begonia cubensis Hassk.
- Begonia cucphuongensis H.Q.Nguyen & Tebbitt
- Begonia cucullata Willd.
- Begonia cucurbitifolia C.Y.Wu
- Begonia cuernavacensis Ziesenh.
- Begonia culasiensis C.I Peng, Rubite, C.W.Lin & K.F.Chung
- Begonia cumingiana (Klotzsch) A.DC.
- Begonia cumingii A.Gray
- Begonia cuneatifolia Irmsch.
- Begonia cunhambebei E.L.Jacques
- Begonia cupreata Henriq.
- Begonia curtii L.B.Sm. & B.G.Schub.
- Begonia curtisii Ridl.
- Begonia curvicarpa S.M.Ku, C.I Peng & Yan Liu
- Begonia curvifolia Ardi
- Begonia cyanescens Sands
- Begonia cyathophora Poepp. & Endl.
- Begonia cylindrata L.B.Sm. & B.G.Schub.
- Begonia cylindrica D.R.Liang & X.X.Chen
- Begonia cymbalifera L.B.Sm. & B.G.Schub.

== D ==
- Begonia dakrongensis C.H.Nguyen, T.A.Le & C.W.Lin
- Begonia dalaiensis B.Das, J.Saikia & D.Banik
- Begonia dampae Odyuo, B.K.Sinha, Murug. & A.Uddin
- Begonia danumensis Chong
- Begonia danxiaensis D.K.Tian & X.L.Yu
- Begonia darthvaderiana C.W.Lin & C.I Peng
- Begonia dasyantha C.Y.Ling & S.Julia
- Begonia dasycaulis Kiew & C.Y.Ling
- Begonia datii T.S.Hoang & C.W.Lin
- Begonia daunhitam W.G.Wang, C.X.L.Wang, S.Z.Zhang & Randi
- Begonia daweishanensis S.H.Huang & Y.M.Shui
- Begonia daxinensis T.C.Ku
- Begonia dealbata Liebm.
- Begonia debaoensis C.I Peng, Yan Liu & S.M.Ku
- Begonia decandra Pav. ex A.DC.
- Begonia decaryana Humbert ex Aymonin & Bosser
- Begonia declinata Vell.
- Begonia decora Stapf
- Begonia delicata Gregório & J.A.S. Costa
- Begonia deltoides Moonlight
- Begonia delicatula Parish ex C.B.Clarke
- Begonia demissa Craib
- Begonia densifolia Irmsch.
- Begonia densiretis Irmsch.
- Begonia dentatiloba A.DC.
- Begonia dentatobracteata C.Y.Wu
- Begonia denticulata Kunth
- Begonia depauperata Schott
- Begonia depingiana Y.H.Tan & H.B.Ding
- Begonia depressinerva Pranada
- Begonia descoleana L.B.Sm. & B.G.Schub.
- Begonia devexa S.Julia & Kiew
- Begonia dewildei Sosef
- Begonia diadema Linden
- Begonia dichotoma Jacq.
- Begonia dichroa Sprague
- Begonia dicressine Wahlsteen
- Begonia didyma D.C.Thomas & Ardi
- Begonia diegoi Jara
- Begonia dielsiana E.Pritz. ex Diels
- Begonia dieuanhiae T.S.Hoang & C.W.Li
- Begonia difformis (Irmsch.) W.C.Leong, C.I Peng & K.F.Chung
- Begonia diffusa L.B.Sm. & B.G.Schub.
- Begonia diffusiflora Merr. & L.M.Perry
- Begonia digitata Raddi
- Begonia digyna Irmsch.
- Begonia dimidiata Vell. ex Walp.
- Begonia dimorpha S.Julia
- Begonia dinhdui Craib
- Begonia dinosauria C.W.Lin & C.I Peng
- Begonia dioica Buch.-Ham. ex D.Don
- Begonia dipetala Graham
- Begonia discrepans Irmsch.
- Begonia discreta Craib
- Begonia divaricata Irmsch.
- Begonia divergens Kiew & S.Julia
- Begonia diversistipulata Irmsch.
- Begonia diwolii Kiew
- Begonia djamuensis Irmsch.
- Begonia dolichobracteata Girm.
- Begonia dolichocarpa Girm.
- Begonia dolichotricha Merr.
- Begonia doloisii Rimi
- Begonia domingensis A.DC.
- Begonia donkelaariana Lem.
- Begonia dorisiae Bucay, Tandang & K.F.Chung
- Begonia dosedlae Gilli
- Begonia dracopelta Ardi
- Begonia dregei Otto & Dietr.
- Begonia dressleri Burt-Utley
- Begonia droopiae Ardi
- Begonia droseroides C.I Peng, Rubite & C.W.Lin
- Begonia dryadis Irmsch.
- Begonia ducii C.H.Nguyen, T.A.Le & C.W.Lin
- Begonia duclouxii Gagnep.
- Begonia dugandiana L.B.Sm. & B.G.Schub.
- Begonia duhungensis Girm.
- Begonia duncan-thomasii Sosef
- Begonia duruisseaui Scherber.
- Begonia dux C.B.Clarke

== E ==
- Begonia eberhardtii Gagnep.
- Begonia ebo H.Lockwood
- Begonia ebolowensis Engl.
- Begonia echinosepala Regel
- Begonia eciliata O.E.Schulz
- Begonia edanoi Merr.
- Begonia edgariana S.Julia & Kiew
- Begonia edulis H.Lév.
- Begonia egamii D.Borah, Taram & M.Hughes
- Begonia egregia N.E.Br.
- Begonia ehuangzhangensis Q.L.Ding, W.Y.Zhao & W.B.Liao
- Begonia eiromischa Ridl.
- Begonia elachista Moonlight & Tebbitt
- Begonia elaeagnifolia Hook.f.
- Begonia elatostematoides Merr.
- Begonia elegantifolia Y.E.Ritonga, Girm. & Mustaqim
- Begonia elatostemma Ridl.
- Begonia elatostemmoides Hook. f.
- Begonia elianeae Gregório & J.A.S. Costa
- Begonia eliassii Warb.
- Begonia elisabethae Kiew
- Begonia elmeri Merr.
- Begonia elnidoensis C.I Peng, Rubite & C.W.Lin
- Begonia embera Jara & D.Franco
- Begonia emeiensis C.M.Hu
- Begonia eminii Warb.
- Begonia engleri Gilg
- Begonia enoplocampa D.C.Thomas & Ardi
- Begonia epipsila Brade
- Begonia erecta Vell.
- Begonia erectocarpa H.Q.Nguyen, Y.M.Shui & W.H.Chen
- Begonia erectocaulis Sosef
- Begonia erectotricha Sosef
- Begonia erminea L'Hér.
- Begonia erodiifolia Sands
- Begonia erythrobracteata M.D.Miranda & E.L.Jacques
- Begonia erythrofolia Lei Cai, D.M.He & W.G.Wang
- Begonia erythrogyna Sands
- Begonia erythrothrix Tebbitt & Moonlight
- Begonia esculenta Merr.
- Begonia espiritosantensis E.L.Jacques & Mamede
- Begonia estrellensis C.DC.
- Begonia euryphylla L.B.Sm. ex S.F.Sm. & Wassh.
- Begonia eutricha Sands
- Begonia everettii Merr.
- Begonia exalata C.DC.
- Begonia exigua Irmsch.
- Begonia exilis O.E.Schulz
- Begonia exposita Phutthai & M.Hughes
- Begonia extensa L.B.Sm. & B.G.Schub.
- Begonia extranea L.B.Sm. & B.G.Schub.

== F ==
- Begonia fagifolia Fisch.
- Begonia fagopyrofolia W.H.Chen & Y.M.Shui
- Begonia fairchildii Ardi & D.C.Thomas
- Begonia falciloba Liebm.
- Begonia fangchengensis Y.N.Huang, X.X.Feng & R.K.Li
- Begonia fangii Y.M.Shui & C.I Peng
- Begonia fasciculata Jack
- Begonia fasciculiflora Merr.
- Begonia faustinoi Burt-Utley & Utley
- Begonia felis C.W.Lin & C.I Peng
- Begonia fellereriana Irmsch.
- Begonia fenicis Merr.
- Begonia fenshuilingensis X.X.Feng, R.K.Li & Z.X.Liu
- Begonia fernaldiana L.B.Sm. & B.G.Schub.
- Begonia fernandoi-costae Irmsch.
- Begonia ferox C.-I Peng & Yan Liu
- Begonia ferramica N.Hallé
- Begonia ferruginea L.f.
- Begonia festiva Craib
- Begonia fibrosa C.B.Clarke
- Begonia fiebrigii C.DC.
- Begonia filibracteosa Irmsch.
- Begonia filiformis Irmsch.
- Begonia fimbriata Liebm.
- Begonia fimbribracteata Y.M.Shui & W.H.Chen
- Begonia fimbristipula Hance
- Begonia fimbritepala E.L.Jacques
- Begonia fischeri Schrank
- Begonia fissistyla Irmsch.
- Begonia flacca Irmsch.
- Begonia flaccidissima Kurz
- Begonia flagellaris H.Hara
- Begonia flammea Rimi
- Begonia flaviflora H.Hara
- Begonia flavovirens Kiew & S.Julia
- Begonia flexicaulis Ridl.
- Begonia flexula Ridl.
- Begonia floccifera Bedd.
- Begonia floriprolifera J.Y.Zhou & D.K.Tian
- Begonia fluminensis Brade
- Begonia fluvialis M.Hughes
- Begonia foliosa Kunth
- Begonia fonsecae Standl.
- Begonia forbesii King
- Begonia fordii Irmsch.
- Begonia forgetiana Hemsl.
- Begonia formosana (Hayata) Masam.
- Begonia formosissima Sandwith
- Begonia forrestii Irmsch.
- Begonia fortunensis Burt-Utley & Utley
- Begonia foveolata Irmsch.
- Begonia foxworthyi Burkill ex Ridl.
- Begonia fractalifolia H.P.Wilson & Jimbo
- Begonia fractiflexa S.Julia & Kiew
- Begonia fragae L.Kollmann & Peixoto
- Begonia francisabuidii Dela Cruz, S.R.Concepcion & Y.P.Ang
- Begonia francisiae Ziesenh.
- Begonia francoisii Guillaumin
- Begonia fraseri Kiew
- Begonia friburgensis Brade
- Begonia fritschiana Amoroso & Rubite
- Begonia froebelii A.DC.
- Begonia fruticella Ridl.
- Begonia fruticosa (Klotzsch) A.DC.
- Begonia fuchsiiflora (A.DC.) A.I.Baranov & F.A.Barkley
- Begonia fulgurata Peng, C.-I; Lin, C.-W.; Phutthai, T.
- Begonia fulvosetulosa Brade
- Begonia fulvovillosa Warb.
- Begonia furfuracea Hook.f.
- Begonia fusca Liebm.
- Begonia fuscisetosa Sands
- Begonia fuscocaulis Brade
- Begonia fusialata Warb.
- Begonia fusibulba C.DC.
- Begonia fusicarpa Irmsch.
- Begonia fuyangii D.K.Tian, W.G.Wang & H.C.Xi

== G ==
- Begonia gabaldonensis Rubite, C.I Peng & C.W.Lin
- Begonia gabonensis J.J.de Wilde
- Begonia gagnepainiana Irmsch.
- Begonia galaxia C.W.Lin
- Begonia galea Moonlight & A.Fuentes
- Begonia galeanoae Jara
- Begonia galeolepis Ardi & D.C.Thomas
- Begonia gambutensis Ardi & D.C.Thomas
- Begonia gamolepis L.B.Sm. & B.G.Schub.
- Begonia gampura Mazo & Rubite
- Begonia garagarana C.DC.
- Begonia gardneri A.DC.
- Begonia garrettii Craib
- Begonia garuvae L.B.Sm. & R.C.Sm.
- Begonia gehrtii Irmsch.
- Begonia gelasensis Rimi & Kinahim
- Begonia gemella Warb. ex L.B.Sm. & Wassh.
- Begonia gemmipara Hook.f. & Thomson
- Begonia gentilii De Wild.
- Begonia gentryi Burt-Utley & Utley
- Begonia geoffrayi Gagnep.
- Begonia georgei Coyle
- Begonia geraniifolia Hook.
- Begonia geranioides Hook.f.
- Begonia germaineana Tebbitt
- Begonia gesneriifolia Aver.
- Begonia gibbsiae Irmsch. ex Sands
- Begonia gigabracteata Hong Z.Li & H.Ma
- Begonia gigang Mazo & Rubite
- Begonia giganticaulis D. Tian
- Begonia gilgiana Irmsch.
- Begonia gironellae C.I Peng & Rubite & C.W.Lin
- Begonia gitingensis Elmer
- Begonia glaberrima Urb. & Ekman
- Begonia glabra Aubl.
- Begonia glabricaulis Irmsch.
- Begonia glabritepala Souvann. & Lanors.
- Begonia glandulifera Griseb.
- Begonia glandulosa A.DC. ex Hook.
- Begonia glauca (Klotzsch) Ruiz & Pav. ex A.DC.
- Begonia glechomifolia C.M.Hu
- Begonia goegoensis N.E.Br.
- Begonia goldingiana L.Kollmann & A.P.Fontana
- Begonia gomantongensis Kiew
- Begonia goniotis C.B.Clarke
- Begonia gossweileri Irmsch.
- Begonia goudotii A.DC.
- Begonia gracilicyma Irmsch. ex M.Hughes
- Begonia gracilifolia Y.M.Shui, Nuraliev & Aver.
- Begonia gracilioides Burt-Utley & Utley
- Begonia gracilior Burt-Utley & McVaugh
- Begonia gracilipes Merr.
- Begonia gracilis Kunth
- Begonia grandis Dryand.
- Begonia gregaria Scherber. & Bard.-Vauc.
- Begonia griffithiana (A.DC.) Warb.
- Begonia grisea A.DC.
- Begonia groenewegensis K.Koch & Fint.
- Begonia guaduensis Kunth
- Begonia guangdongensis W.H.Tu, B.M.Wang & Y.L.Li
- Begonia guangxiensis C.Y.Wu
- Begonia guaniana H.Ma & Hong Z.Li
- Begonia guatemalensis Van Houtte ex Galeotti
- Begonia gueritziana Gibbs
- Begonia guishanensis S.H.Huang & Y.M.Shui
- Begonia guixiensis Yan Liu, S.M.Ku & C.I Peng
- Begonia gulinqingensis S.H.Huang & Y.M.Shui
- Begonia gulongshanensis Y.M.Shui & W.H.Chen
- Begonia gungshanensis C.Y.Wu
- Begonia gunnerifolia Linden & André
- Begonia gusilii Rimi
- Begonia gutierrezii Coyle
- Begonia guttapila D.C.Thomas & Ardi

== H ==
- Begonia haageana W.Watson
- Begonia hahiepiana H.Q.Nguyen & Tebbitt
- Begonia hainanensis Chun & F.Chun
- Begonia halabanensis M.Hughes
- Begonia halconensis Merr.
- Begonia hammoniae Irmsch.
- Begonia handelii Irmsch.
- Begonia handibadaganathensis Aitawade, Bachulkar & S.R.Yadav
- Begonia handroi Brade
- Begonia hanhhoae C.W.Lin, V.C.Nguyen, Vuong & Aver
- Begonia harauensis Girm.
- Begonia harimalalae Scherber. & Duruiss.
- Begonia harlingii L.B.Sm. & Wassh.
- Begonia harmandii Gagnep.
- Begonia hasskarliana (Miq.) Miq. ex A.DC.
- Begonia hatacoa Buch.-Ham. ex D.Don
- Begonia havilandii Ridl.
- Begonia hayamiana Nob.Tanaka
- Begonia hederacea A.DC.
- Begonia hekensis D.C.Thomas
- Begonia hekouensis S.H.Huang
- Begonia heliantha Tebbitt
- Begonia heliostrophe Kiew
- Begonia hemicardia Elmer ex Rubite
- Begonia hemsleyana Hook.f.
- Begonia henrilaportei Scherber. & Duruiss.
- Begonia henryi Hemsl.
- Begonia heracleifolia Cham. & Schltdl.
- Begonia herbacea Vell.
- Begonia heringeri Brade
- Begonia hernandioides Merr.
- Begonia herrerae L.B.Sm. & B.G.Schub.
- Begonia herveyana King
- Begonia heterocantha Souvann. & Lanors.
- Begonia heterochroma Sosef
- Begonia heteroclinis Miq. ex Koord.
- Begonia heteropoda Baker
- Begonia hexandra Irmsch.
- Begonia hexaptera Sands
- Begonia heydei C.DC.
- Begonia hidirii Tawan, Ipor & Meekiong
- Begonia hijauvenia Creating Girm., Ardi & M.HughesFotsch
- Begonia hilariana A.DC.
- Begonia himalaica D.Borah, Chowlu, A.Shenoy & Taram
- Begonia hinnamnoensis Souvann. & Lanors.
- Begonia hintoniana L.B.Sm. & B.G.Schub.
- Begonia hirsuta Aubl.
- Begonia hirsuticarpa C.W.Lin & C.I Peng
- Begonia hirsuticaulis Irmsch.
- Begonia hirsutula Hook.f.
- Begonia hirta (Klotzsch) L.B.Sm. & B.G.Schub.
- Begonia hirtella Link
- Begonia hirtitepala S.Julia & Kiew
- Begonia hispida Schott ex A.DC.
- Begonia hispidissima Zipp. ex Koord.
- Begonia hispidavillosa Ziesenh.
- Begonia hitchcockii Irmsch.
- Begonia hoehneana Irmsch.
- Begonia hohuanensis S.S.Ying
- Begonia holmnielseniana L.B.Sm. & Wassh.
- Begonia holosericea Teijsm. & Binn.
- Begonia holosericeoides Ardi & D.C.Thomas
- Begonia holostyla Y.M.Shui & W.H.Chen
- Begonia holtonis A.DC.
- Begonia holttumii Irmsch.
- Begonia homonyma Steud.
- Begonia hondurensis Burt-Utley & Utley
- Begonia hongiaoensis C.W.Lin, T.C.Hsu & Luu
- Begonia hongkongensis F.W.Xing
- Begonia hooveriana Wiriad.
- Begonia horsfieldii (Miq.) Miq. ex A.DC.
- Begonia horticola Irmsch.
- Begonia hosensis C.W.Lin & C.I Peng
- Begonia howii Merr. & Chun
- Begonia hpaanensis M.B.Maw & Paing
- Begonia huancabambae Moonlight
- Begonia huangii Y.M.Shui & W.H.Chen
- Begonia hubertii Ziesenh.
- Begonia huegelii (Klotzsch) A.DC.
- Begonia hughesii Rubite & C.I Peng
- Begonia hullettii Ridl.
- Begonia humbertii Keraudren
- Begonia humboldtiana Gibbs
- Begonia humericola Sands
- Begonia humifusa S.Julia & Kiew
- Begonia humilicaulis Irmsch.
- Begonia humilis Aiton
- Begonia humillima L.B.Sm. & Wassh.
- Begonia hydrocotylifolia Otto ex Hook.
- Begonia hydrophylloides L.B.Sm. & B.G.Schub.
- Begonia hymenocarpa C.Y.Wu
- Begonia hymenophylla Gagnep.
- Begonia hymenophylloides F.K.Ward ex L.B.Sm. & Wassh.
- Begonia hypoleuca Y.H.Tan & H.B.Ding
- Begonia iarae M.D.Miranda

== I ==
- Begonia ibitiocensis E.L.Jacques & Mamede
- Begonia ignea (Klotzsch) Warsz. ex A.DC.
- Begonia ignita C.W.Lin & C.I Peng
- Begonia ignorata Irmsch.
- Begonia ignota C.Y.Ling & Kiew
- Begonia imbrexiformis Moonlight
- Begonia imbricata Sands
- Begonia imitans Irmsch.
- Begonia imperfecta Irmsch.
- Begonia imperialis Lem.
- Begonia incarnata Link & Otto
- Begonia incerta Craib
- Begonia incisa A.DC.
- Begonia incisoserrata (Klotzsch) A.DC.
- Begonia incompta Kiew
- Begonia incondita Craib
- Begonia incudiformicarpa Ardi & D.C.Thomas
- Begonia inculta Irmsch.
- Begonia inermis Irmsch.
- Begonia inggitiae Ardi & Girm.
- Begonia inobongensis Kiew
- Begonia inopinata Guanih
- Begonia inostegia Stapf
- Begonia inostegioides Chong
- Begonia insolita C.Y.Ling & S.Julia
- Begonia insueta D.C.Thomas & Ardi
- Begonia insularis Brade
- Begonia insularum Irmsch.
- Begonia integerrima Spreng.
- Begonia integrifolia Dalzell
- Begonia inumbrata E.L.Jacques
- Begonia inversa Irmsch.
- Begonia involucrata Liebm.
- Begonia ionophylla Irmsch.
- Begonia iridescens Dunn
- Begonia iridifolia C.W.Lin & C.I Peng
- Begonia irmscheri L.B.Sm. & B.G.Schub.
- Begonia isabelensis Quisumb. & Merr.
- Begonia isadorae E.L.Jacques
- Begonia isalensis Humbert ex Aymonin & Bosser
- Begonia iskandariana Ardi & D.C.Thomas
- Begonia isoptera Dryand. ex Sm.
- Begonia isopterocarpa Irmsch.
- Begonia isopteroidea King
- Begonia itaguassuensis Brade
- Begonia itaipeensis E.L.Jacques
- Begonia itatiaiensis Brade
- Begonia itatinensis Irmsch. ex Brade
- Begonia itingae E.L.Jacques
- Begonia itupavensis Brade
- Begonia iucunda Irmsch.

== J ==
- Begonia jackiana M.Hughes
- Begonia jagorii Warb.
- Begonia jaguarensis L.Kollmann, R.S.Lopes & Peixoto
- Begonia jaliscana Burt-Utley
- Begonia jamaicensis A.DC.
- Begonia jamilahana Y.W.Low, Joffre & Ariffin
- Begonia jamilahanuana S.Julia
- Begonia jamiliana Rimi
- Begonia jaranpusangensis Girm.
- Begonia jarmilae Halda
- Begonia jayaensis Kiew
- Begonia jenginensis S.Julia & Kiew
- Begonia jenmanii Tutin
- Begonia jiewhoei Kiew
- Begonia jingxiensis D.Fang & Y.G.Wei
- Begonia jinyunensis C.I Peng, Bo Ding & Qian Wang
- Begonia jocelinoi Brade
- Begonia jocotocoi Á.J.Pérez & Tebbitt
- Begonia joffrei S.Julia
- Begonia johariana S.Julia & C.Y.Ling
- Begonia johnstonii Oliv. ex Hook.f.
- Begonia johntanii Ardi & D.C.Thomas
- Begonia jokwaniana C.Y.Ling & S.Julia
- Begonia josephi A.DC.
- Begonia joshii Moonlight
- Begonia jubar V.T.Pham & C.W.Lin
- Begonia jugamensis S.Julia & Kiew
- Begonia juliana Loefgr. ex Irmsch.
- Begonia juliasangii Kiew
- Begonia juninensis Irmsch.
- Begonia juntasensis Kuntze
- Begonia jureiensis S.J.Gomes da Silva & Mamede
- Begonia jurgenneae Naive & Buenvenida

== K ==
- Begonia kabaenensis D.C.Thomas & Ardi
- Begonia kachak K.G.Pearce
- Begonia kachinensis Nob.Tanaka
- Begonia kalabenonensis Humbert ex Aymonin & Bosser
- Begonia kalbreyeri (Oliv.) L.B.Sm. & B.G.Schub.
- Begonia kalimantana Randi & Ardi
- Begonia kanaensis Kiew & C.Y.Ling
- Begonia kanburiensis Phutthai
- Begonia kaniensis Irmsch.
- Begonia kapuashuluensis Randi & Ardi
- Begonia karangputihensis Girm.
- Begonia karperi J.C.Arends
- Begonia karwinskyana A.DC.
- Begonia kasutensis K.G.Pearce
- Begonia kayinensis M.B.Maw & Y.H.Tan
- Begonia kebuhoensis S.Julia & C.Y.Ling
- Begonia keeana Kiew
- Begonia keithii Kiew
- Begonia kekarmonyingensis Taram, D.Borah & M.Hughes
- Begonia kelliana Irmsch.
- Begonia kelumaged Mazo & Rubite
- Begonia kemiriensis Girm. & M.Hughes
- Begonia kemumuensis M.Hughes
- Begonia kenworthyae Ziesenh.
- Begonia keraudreniae Bosser
- Begonia kerstingii Irmsch.
- Begonia khammouanensis Souvann. & Lamxay
- Begonia khaophanomensis Phutthai & M.Hughes
- Begonia khasiana C.B.Clarke
- Begonia khaucaensis Luu & C.W.Lin
- Begonia kiamfeei Kiew & S.Julia
- Begonia kibambanganensis Guanih & Chong
- Begonia killipiana L.B.Sm. & B.G.Schub.
- Begonia kinabaluensis Sands
- Begonia kinahimiae Rimi
- Begonia kimlongii V.C.Nguyen, T.S.Hoang & C.W.Lin
- Begonia kingdon-wardii Tebbitt
- Begonia kingiana Irmsch.
- Begonia kinhoi Ardi & D.C.Thomas
- Begonia kipandiensis S.Julia
- Begonia kisuluana Büttner
- Begonia klemmei Merr.
- Begonia klossii Ridl.
- Begonia knoopii Ziesenh.
- Begonia koelzii R.Camfield
- Begonia koksunii Kiew
- Begonia komoensis Irmsch.
- Begonia konderreisiana L.B.Sm. & R.C.Sm.
- Begonia koordersii Warb. ex L.B.Sm. & Wassh.
- Begonia korthalsiana Miq. ex M.Hughes
- Begonia kortsiae Ziesenh.
- Begonia krystofii Halda
- Begonia kuchingensis C.W.Lin & C.I Peng
- Begonia kudoensis Girm.
- Begonia kuhlmannii Brade
- Begonia kui C.I Peng
- Begonia kumangiana S.Julia & C.Y.Ling
- Begonia kunthiana Walp.
- Begonia kuofangii W.B.Xu & W.G.Wang
- Begonia kurakura Tawan, Ipor & Meekiong

== L ==
- Begonia labengkiensis Ardi & D.C.Thomas
- Begonia labiensis (Sands) S.Julia
- Begonia labordei H.Lév.
- Begonia laccophora Sands
- Begonia lacera Merr.
- Begonia lacerata Irmsch.
- Begonia lachaoensis Ziesenh.
- Begonia lacunosa Warb.
- Begonia laevis Ridl.
- Begonia lagunensis Elmer
- Begonia lailana Kiew & Geri
- Begonia lambii Kiew
- Begonia lambirensis Kiew & S.Julia
- Begonia lamdongiana C.W.Lin, T.C.Hsu & Luu
- Begonia laminariae Irmsch.
- Begonia lamolina Moonlight
- Begonia lamriana Rimi
- Begonia lamxayana Souvann.
- Begonia lancangensis S.H.Huang(vi)
- Begonia lanceolata Vell.
- Begonia lancifolia Merr.
- Begonia lancilimba Merr.
- Begonia langbianensis Baker f.
- Begonia langenbergiana L.Kollmann
- Begonia langsonensis C.I Peng & C.W.Lin
- Begonia lansatensis Kiew & S.Julia
- Begonia lansbergeae L.Linden & Rodigas
- Begonia lanstyakii Brade
- Begonia lanternaria Irmsch.
- Begonia lanuzaensis F.A.Blasco, Rubite, J.C.Cortes & Alejandro
- Begonia lanxangensis Souvann. & Aver.
- Begonia laotica Y.H.Tan & H.B.Ding
- Begonia laporteifolia Warb.
- Begonia larorum L.B.Sm. & Wassh.
- Begonia laruei M.Hughes
- Begonia larvata C.I Peng, Yan Liu & W.B.Xu
- Begonia lasioura D.C.Thomas & Ardi
- Begonia latibracteata Y.H.Tan, M.B.Maw & H.B.Ding
- Begonia latifolia S.Julia & C.Y.Ling
- Begonia latistipula Merr.
- Begonia lauterbachii Warb.
- Begonia lawar Randi & M.Hughes
- Begonia lawii C.W.Lin & C.I Peng
- Begonia laxa L.B.Sm. & B.G.Schub.
- Begonia laxiflora B.V.Thanh, M.T.Le, Nghiem & C.W.Lin
- Begonia layang-layang Kiew
- Begonia lazat Kiew & Reza Azmi
- Begonia lealii Brade
- Begonia leandrii Humbert ex Aymonin & Bosser
- Begonia leathermaniae O'Reilly & Kareg.
- Begonia lecongkietii N.S.Lý & M.Hughes
- Begonia ledermannii Irmsch.
- Begonia lehmannii (Irmsch.) L.B.Sm. & B.G.Schub.
- Begonia leipingensis D.K.Tian, Li H.Yang & Chun Li
- Begonia leivae J.Sierra
- Begonia lempuyangensis Girm.
- Begonia lemurica Keraudren
- Begonia lengguanii Kiew
- Begonia leopoldinensis L.Kollmann
- Begonia lepida Blume
- Begonia lepidella Ridl.
- Begonia leprosa Hance
- Begonia leptantha C.B.Rob.
- Begonia leptoptera H.Hara
- Begonia leptostyla Irmsch.
- Begonia letestui J.J.de Wilde
- Begonia letouzeyi Sosef
- Begonia leucochlora Sands
- Begonia leuconeura Urb. & Ekman
- Begonia leucosticta Warb.
- Begonia leucotricha Sands
- Begonia leuserensis M.Hughes
- Begonia liangguangensis D.K.Tian & J.Y.Zhou
- Begonia libanensis Urb.
- Begonia libera (L.B.Sm. & B.G.Schub.) L.B.Sm. & B.G.Schub.
- Begonia lichenora C.W.Lin & C.I Peng
- Begonia liesneri Burt-Utley & Utley
- Begonia lignescens Morton
- Begonia lii C.W.Lin & C.H.Nguyen
- Begonia lilliputana M.Hughes
- Begonia limmingheiana É.Morren
- Begonia limprichtii Irmsch.
- Begonia linauensis S.Julia
- Begonia lindleyana Walp.
- Begonia lindmanii Brade
- Begonia linearifolia J.Sierra
- Begonia lineolata Brade
- Begonia lingiae S.Julia
- Begonia lipolepis L.B.Sm.
- Begonia listada L.B.Sm. & Wassh.
- Begonia lithophila C.Y.Wu
- Begonia littleri Merr.
- Begonia littoralis M.D.Miranda & E.L.Jacques
- Begonia liuyanii C.I Peng, S.M.Ku & W.C.Leong
- Begonia lobbii (Hassk.) A.DC.
- Begonia locbaosangii D.D.Nguyen & C.W.Lin
- Begonia locii C.I Peng, C.W.Lin & H.Q.Nguyen
- Begonia loheri Merr.
- Begonia lombokensis Girm.
- Begonia lomensis Britton & Wilson
- Begonia longanensis C.Y.Wu
- Begonia longgangensis C.I Peng & Yan Liu
- Begonia longialata K.Y.Guan & D.K.Tian
- Begonia longibarbata Brade
- Begonia longibractea Merr.
- Begonia longicarpa K.Y.Guan & D.K.Tian
- Begonia longicaulis Ridl.
- Begonia longiciliata C.Y.Wu
- Begonia longifolia Blume
- Begonia longinoda Merr.
- Begonia longinqua Moonlight
- Begonia longiornithophylla C.I Peng, W.B.Xu & Yan Liu
- Begonia longipedunculata Golding & Kareg.
- Begonia longipetiolata Gilg
- Begonia longirostris Benth.
- Begonia longiscapa Warb.
- Begonia longiseta Irmsch.
- Begonia longistipula Merr.
- Begonia longistyla Y.M.Shui & W.H.Chen
- Begonia longitepala Moonlight
- Begonia longivillosa A.DC.
- Begonia longlingensis Y.H.Tan & H.B.Ding
- Begonia lopensis Sosef & M.E.Leal
- Begonia lophoptera Rolfe
- Begonia lophura T.S.Hoang & C.W.Lin
- Begonia loranthoides Hook.f.
- Begonia lorentzonii Wahlsteen & D.Borah
- Begonia lorenzii E.L.Jacques
- Begonia lossiae L.Kollmann
- Begonia louis-williamsii Burt-Utley
- Begonia lowiana King
- Begonia ltahensis Girm.
- Begonia luangprabangensis Phonep.
- Begonia lubbersii E.Morren
- Begonia lucidissima Golding & Kareg.
- Begonia lucifuga Irmsch.
- Begonia lucivenia W.G.Wang, R.K.Li & H.C.Xi
- Begonia lucychongiana S.Julia & Kiew
- Begonia ludicra A.DC.
- Begonia ludwigii Irmsch.
- Begonia lugonis L.B.Sm. & Wassh.
- Begonia lugrae Ardhaka & Undaharta
- Begonia lui S.M.Ku, C.I Peng & Yan Liu
- Begonia lukuana Y.C.Liu & C.H.Ou
- Begonia lunatistyla Irmsch.
- Begonia luochengensis S.M.Ku, C.I Peng & Yan Liu
- Begonia lushaiensis C.E.C.Fisch.
- Begonia lutea L.B.Sm. & B.G.Schub.
- Begonia luteyorum (L.B.Sm. & Wassh.) Jara
- Begonia luzhaiensis T.C.Ku
- Begonia luzonensis Warb.
- Begonia lyallii A.DC.
- Begonia lyman-smithii Burt-Utley & Utley
- Begonia lyniceorum Burt-Utley

== M ==
- Begonia mabberleyana D.C.Thomas & Ardi
- Begonia mabuhayensis F.A.Blasco, Alejandro & Rubite
- Begonia macduffieana L.B.Sm. & B.G.Schub.
- Begonia macgregorii Merr.
- Begonia machrisiana L.B.Sm. & B.G.Schub.
- Begonia maciejewskii D.K.Tian, T.S.Hoang & W.G.Wang
- Begonia macintyreana M.Hughes
- Begonia macra A.DC.
- Begonia macrantha B.Das, J.Saikia & D.Banik
- Begonia macrocarpa Warb.
- Begonia macrotis Vis.
- Begonia macrotoma Irmsch.
- Begonia maculata Raddi
- Begonia maculifolia Y.M.Shui, Nuraliev & Aver.
- Begonia macvaughii Burt-Utley & Utley
- Begonia madaiensis Kiew
- Begonia madecassa Keraudren
- Begonia madulidii Rubite, C.I Peng & C.W.Lin
- Begonia maestrensis Urb.
- Begonia magdalenae L.B.Sm. & B.G.Schub.
- Begonia magdalenensis Brade
- Begonia magentifolia Kiew & S.Julia
- Begonia magnicarpa C.W.Lin & C.I Peng
- Begonia maguniana H.P.Wilson
- Begonia majungaensis Guillaumin
- Begonia makrinii C.V. Morton ex Burt-Utley & K. Utley
- Begonia makuruyot M.G.Rule, Y.P.Ang, Rubite, Docot, R.A.Bustam. & A.S.Rob.
- Begonia malabarica Lam.
- Begonia malachosticta Sands
- Begonia malindangensis Merr.
- Begonia malipoensis S.H.Huang & Y.M.Shui
- Begonia malmquistiana Irmsch.
- Begonia mamapachensis Jara
- Begonia mamedeana E.L.Jacques & Gomes da Silva
- Begonia mamutensis Sands
- Begonia mananjebensis Humbert
- Begonia mangdenensis T.S.Hoang & C.W.Lin
- Begonia mangorensis Humbert
- Begonia manhaoensis S.H.Huang & Y.M.Shui
- Begonia manicata Brongn.
- Begonia manillensis A.DC.
- Begonia mannii Hook.f.
- Begonia manuselaensis Ardhaka & Ardi
- Begonia maracayuensis Parodi
- Begonia maraiparaiense Rossiti & Rimi
- Begonia margaretiana Handro ex L.Kollmann
- Begonia mariachristinae Wahlsteen
- Begonia mariae L.B.Sm.
- Begonia mariaensis Rimi & Simun
- Begonia mariannensis Wassh. & McClellan
- Begonia marinae Tebbitt
- Begonia mariti Burt-Utley
- Begonia markiana Taram, Wahlsteen & D.Borah
- Begonia marnieri Keraudren
- Begonia marojejyensis Humbert
- Begonia martabanica A.DC.
- Begonia martinezii Burt-Utley & Utley
- Begonia masarangensis Irmsch.
- Begonia masilig J.Collantes, C.J.P.Dela Cruz & Y.P.Ang,
- Begonia masoalaensis M.Hughes
- Begonia masoniana Irmsch. ex Ziesenh.
- Begonia matahom F.A.Blasco, Alejandro, Tandang & Rubite
- Begonia matangensis S.Julia & Kiew
- Begonia matarombeoensis D.C.Thomas & Ardi
- Begonia matogrossensis L.B.Sm. ex S.F.Sm. & Wassh.
- Begonia mattampensis Ardi & D.C.Thomas
- Begonia mattos-silvae L.B.Sm. ex S.F.Sm. & Wassh.
- Begonia matudae Burt-Utley & Utley
- Begonia matulis Bucay, Tandang & K.F.Chung
- Begonia maurandiae A.DC.
- Begonia maxwelliana King
- Begonia maynensis A.DC.
- Begonia mazae Ziesenh.
- Begonia mbangaensis Sosef
- Begonia mcphersonii Burt-Utley & Utley
- Begonia mearnsii Merr.
- Begonia medeirosii Funez & J.C.Jaramillo
- Begonia media Merr. & L.M.Perry
- Begonia medicinalis Ardi & D.C.Thomas
- Begonia medinae Bucay, Tandang & K.F.Chung
- Begonia medogensis Jian W.Li, Y.H.Tan & X.H.Jin
- Begonia medusae Linden
- Begonia megacarpa Merr.
- Begonia megalantha Merr.
- Begonia megalophyllaria C.Y.Wu
- Begonia megaptera A.DC.
- Begonia mekonggensis Girm. & Wiriad.
- Begonia melanobullata C.-I Peng & C. W. Lin.
- Begonia melanosticta Chong & Guanih
- Begonia melikopia Kiew
- Begonia melinauensis S.Julia & Kiew
- Begonia menchunaensis P.Gyeltshen & M.Hughes
- Begonia mendumiae M.Hughes
- Begonia mengdongensis H.H.Xi
- Begonia menglianensis Y.Y.Qian
- Begonia mengtzeana Irmsch.
- Begonia mentawaiensis Girm.
- Begonia mentewangensis Girm.
- Begonia mentiens S.Julia & Kiew
- Begonia merendonensis Moonlight & D.L.Kelly
- Begonia meridensis A.DC.
- Begonia meriraiensis S.Julia & Kiew
- Begonia merrilliana C.I Peng, Rubite, C.W.Lin & K.F.Chung
- Begonia merrittii Merr.
- Begonia metallica W.G.Sm.
- Begonia metallicolor C.W.Lin & C.I Peng
- Begonia meyeri-johannis Engl.
- Begonia meysseliana Linden
- Begonia micheliniana L.Kollmann
- Begonia michoacana L.B.Sm. & B.G.Schub.
- Begonia micranthera Griseb.
- Begonia microcarpa A.DC.
- Begonia microinduta M.D.Miranda
- Begonia microptera Hook.f.
- Begonia microsperma Warb.
- Begonia mildbraedii Gilg
- Begonia militaris L.B.Sm. & B.G.Schub.
- Begonia mimikaensis Sands
- Begonia mindanaensis Warb.
- Begonia mindorensis Merr.
- Begonia minhaniae T.S.Hoang & C.W.Lin
- Begonia minicarpa H.Hara
- Begonia minissima H.Q.Nguyen, Y.M.Shui & W.H.Chen
- Begonia minjemensis Irmsch.
- Begonia mishmiorum S.Chowdhury, B.Hajong, P.Bharali
- Begonia minor Jacq.
- Begonia minuscula Aver.
- Begonia minuta Sosef
- Begonia minutiflora Sands
- Begonia minutifolia N.Hallé
- Begonia minutitepala S.Julia & Kiew
- Begonia mizoramensis Vanlalawmpuia, Khomdram & Yumkham
- Begonia modestiflora Kurz
- Begonia molinana Burt-Utley
- Begonia molleri (C.DC.) Warb.
- Begonia mollicaulis Irmsch.
- Begonia mollis A.DC.
- Begonia mollissima Y.M.Shui, H.Q.Nguyen & W.H.Chen
- Begonia moluccana D.C.Thomas, Ardaka & Ardi
- Begonia monadelpha (Klotzsch) Ruiz & Pav. ex A.DC.
- Begonia monantha Warb.
- Begonia moneta C.I Peng, Rimi & C.W.Lin
- Begonia monicae Aymonin & Bosser
- Begonia monophylla Pav. ex A.DC.
- Begonia montana (A.DC.) Warb.
- Begonia montaniformis C.I Peng, C.W.Lin & H.Q.Nguyen
- Begonia monte-alenensis Sosef
- Begonia montis-bismarckii Warb.
- Begonia montis-elephantis J.J.de Wilde
- Begonia mooreana (Irmsch.) L.L.Forrest & Hollingsw.
- Begonia morelii Irmsch. ex Kareg.
- Begonia morifolia T.T.Yu
- Begonia morii Burt-Utley
- Begonia morrisiorum Rekha Morris & P.D.McMillan
- Begonia morsei Irmsch.
- Begonia moszkowskii Irmsch.
- Begonia motozintlensis Burt-Utley & Utley
- Begonia moysesii Brade
- Begonia mucronistipula C.DC.
- Begonia multangula Blume
- Begonia multibracteata Girm.
- Begonia multidentata Warb.
- Begonia multijugata M.Hughes
- Begonia multiloba Moonlight
- Begonia multinervia Liebm.
- Begonia multistaminea Burt-Utley
- Begonia muluensis C.Y.Ling & Kiew
- Begonia muricata Blume
- Begonia murina Craib
- Begonia murlenensis N.Krishna & Pradeep
- Begonia mursalaensis Girm., M. Hughes & Ardi
- Begonia murudensis Merr.
- Begonia murumensis S.Julia & C.Y.Ling
- Begonia myanmarica C.I Peng & Y.D.Kim
- Begonia mystacina L.B.Sm. & Wassh.
- Begonia mysteriosa L.Kollmann & A.P.Fontana

== N ==
- Begonia naemma Y.P.Ang, Aumentado & Magtoto
- Begonia nagaensis Kiew & S.Julia
- Begonia nahangensis Aver. & H.Q.Nguyen
- Begonia nahauensis C.H.Nguyen & C.W.Lin
- Begonia namkadingensis C.J.Yang, Soulad. & Tagane
- Begonia nana L'Hér.
- Begonia nantoensis M.J.Lai & N.J.Chung
- Begonia napoensis L.B.Sm. & Wassh.
- Begonia naraharii Hajong, N.Bhat & Bharali
- Begonia natmataungensis Y.H.Tan, M.B.Maw & H.B.Ding
- Begonia natunaensis C.W.Lin & C.I Peng
- Begonia naumoniensis Irmsch.
- Begonia neglecta A.DC.
- Begonia negrosensis Elmer
- Begonia neisti Hajong, N.Bhat & Bharali
- Begonia nelumbiifolia Cham. & Schltdl.
- Begonia nemoralis L.B.Sm. & B.G.Schub.
- Begonia neocomensium A.DC.
- Begonia neoharlingii L.B.Sm. & Wassh.
- Begonia neoperrieri Humbert ex Aymonin & Bosser
- Begonia neopurpurea L.B.Sm. & Wassh.
- Begonia nepalensis (A.DC.) Warb.
- Begonia nephrophylla Undaharta & Ardi
- Begonia nevadensis Dorr
- Begonia ngocbonii T.S.Hoang & C.W.Lin
- Begonia nhatii V.T.Bui, K.S.Nguyen & C.W.Lin
- Begonia niahensis K.G.Pearce
- Begonia nigritarum Steud.
- Begonia ningmingensis D.Fang, Y.G.Wei & C.I Peng
- Begonia nivea Parish ex Kurz
- Begonia nix C.W.Lin & C.I Peng
- Begonia nobmanniae D.C.Thomas & Ardi
- Begonia noraaunorae Blasco, Tandang, Alejandro & Rubite
- Begonia normaaguilariae M.D.Angeles, Rubite & Tandang
- Begonia nossibea A.DC.
- Begonia nosymangabensis Scherber. & Duruiss.
- Begonia nothobaramensis Joffre
- Begonia notiophila Urb.
- Begonia novalombardiensis L.Kollmann
- Begonia novogranatae A.DC.
- Begonia novoguineensis Merr. & L.M.Perry
- Begonia nubicola L.B.Sm. & B.G.Schub.
- Begonia nuda Irmsch.
- Begonia nummulariifolia Putz.
- Begonia nunezii Moonlight
- Begonia nurii Irmsch.
- Begonia nuwakotensis S.Rajbh.
- Begonia nyassensis Irmsch.
- Begonia nyishiorum A.Shenoy, A.K.Soni & Ab.Kumar

== O ==
- Begonia oaxacana A.DC.
- Begonia obdeltata Gregório & E.L.Jacques
- Begonia oblanceolata Rusby
- Begonia obliqua L.
- Begonia obliquifolia S.H.Huang & Y.M.Shui
- Begonia oblongata Merr.
- Begonia oblongifolia Stapf
- Begonia obovoidea Craib
- Begonia obscura Brade
- Begonia obscuribracteata Y.P.Ang, W.Caban. & M.N.Tamayo
- Begonia obsolescens Irmsch.
- Begonia obtecticaulis Irmsch.
- Begonia obtusifolia Merr.
- Begonia occhionii Brade
- Begonia occidentalis Naive, Ancheta & Alaman
- Begonia occulta C.W.Lin
- Begonia occultata J.P.Allen & Moonlight
- Begonia ocellata Ardi
- Begonia octopetala L'Hér.
- Begonia odeteiantha Handro
- Begonia oellgaardii L.B.Sm. & Wassh.
- Begonia olbia Kerch.
- Begonia oleosa Jara
- Begonia olganunezae Naive & Cababan
- Begonia oligandra Merr. & L.M.Perry
- Begonia oligantha Merr.
- Begonia oligophylla Blume ex Miq.
- Begonia olivacea Ardi
- Begonia oliveri L.B.Sm. & B.G.Schub.
- Begonia opaca C.W.Lin & C.I Peng
- Begonia ophiogyna L.B.Sm. & B.G.Schub.
- Begonia opuliflora Putz.
- Begonia orbiculata Jack
- Begonia orchidiflora Griff.
- Begonia oreodoxa Chun & F.Chun
- Begonia oreophila Kiew
- Begonia organensis Brade
- Begonia ornithocarpa Standl.
- Begonia ornithopedata D.K.Tian & R.K.Li
- Begonia ornithophylla Irmsch.
- Begonia ostulensis Mart.Gord. & M.F.Ramos
- Begonia otophora Merr. & L.M.Perry
- Begonia otophylla L.B.Sm. & B.G.Schub.
- Begonia ovatifolia A.DC.
- Begonia oxyanthera Warb.
- Begonia oxyloba Welw. ex Hook.f.
- Begonia oxyphylla A.DC.
- Begonia oxysperma A.DC.
- Begonia oxyura Merr. & L.M.Perry
- Begonia oyuniae Taram & N.Krishna
- Begonia ozotothrix D.C.Thomas

== P ==
- Begonia pachypoda L.Kollmann & Peixoto
- Begonia pachyrhachis L.B.Sm. & Wassh.
- Begonia padangensis Irmsch.
- Begonia padawanensis C.W.Lin & C.I Peng
- Begonia paganuccii Gregório & J.A.S. Costa
- Begonia palawanensis Merr.
- Begonia paleacea Kurz
- Begonia paleata A.DC.
- Begonia palemlemensis Calaramo, C.W.Lin & Rubite
- Begonia palmata D.Don
- Begonia palmeri S.Watson
- Begonia panamensis Burt-Utley & Utley
- Begonia panayensis Merr.
- Begonia panchtharensis S.Rajbh.
- Begonia paniculata Parodi
- Begonia panjangfolia Girm., Ardi & M.Hughes.
- Begonia pantherina Putz. ex Linden
- Begonia paoana Kiew & S.Julia
- Begonia papuana Warb.
- Begonia papulifolia S.Julia & C.Y.Ling
- Begonia papyraptera Sands
- Begonia paracauliflora Rimi, C.I Peng & S.M.Ku
- Begonia paraguayensis Parodi
- Begonia paranaensis Brade
- Begonia parcifolia C.DC.
- Begonia parishii C.B.Clarke
- Begonia parva Merr.
- Begonia parvibracteata X.X.Feng, R.K.Li & Z.X.Liu
- Begonia parviflora Poepp. & Endl.
- Begonia parvifolia Schott
- Begonia parviglandulosa Souvann. & Lanors.
- Begonia parvilimba Merr.
- Begonia parvistipulata Irmsch.
- Begonia parvula H.Lév. & Vaniot
- Begonia parvuliflora A.DC.
- Begonia pasamanensis M.Hughes
- Begonia pasighatensis D.Borah, Taram & Wahlsteen
- Begonia pastoensis A.DC.
- Begonia patar Randi
- Begonia paucilobata C.Y.Wu
- Begonia paulensis A.DC.
- Begonia paupercula King
- Begonia pavonina Ridl.
- Begonia pax Jara & Zabala
- Begonia payung S.Julia & Kiew
- Begonia pearcei Hook.f.
- Begonia pectennervia L.B.Sm. & Wassh.
- Begonia pedata Liebm.
- Begonia pedatifida H.Lév.
- Begonia pedemontana Moonlight
- Begonia pediophylla Merr. & L.M.Perry
- Begonia pedrabrancensis E.L.Jacques
- Begonia pedunculosa Wall.
- Begonia peekelii Irmsch.
- Begonia peii C.Y.Wu
- Begonia pelargoniiflora J.J.de Wilde & J.C.Arends
- Begonia peltata Otto & Dietr.
- Begonia peltatifolia Li
- Begonia peltifolia Schott
- Begonia pendens H.Q.Nguyen, Y.M.Shui & W.H.Chen
- Begonia pendula Ridl.
- Begonia pendulina Girm. & M.Hughes
- Begonia pengchingii Phutthai & M.Hughes
- Begonia pengii S.M.Ku & Yan Liu
- Begonia penrissenensis Kiew & S.Julia
- Begonia pensilis L.B.Sm. & Wassh.
- Begonia pentandra W.N.Takeuchi
- Begonia pentaphragmifolia Ridl.
- Begonia pentaphylla Walp.
- Begonia peperomioides Hook.f.
- Begonia per-dusenii Brade
- Begonia perakensis King
- Begonia peridoticola Rimi, C.I Peng & C.W.Lin
- Begonia perijaensis Jara
- Begonia pernambucensis Brade
- Begonia perpusilla A.DC.
- Begonia perrieri Bois
- Begonia perryae L.B.Sm. & Wassh.
- Begonia persistens Y.H.Tan, M.B.Maw & H.B.Ding
- Begonia peruibensis Handro
- Begonia perunggufolia Girm. & M.Hughes.
- Begonia peruviana A.DC.
- Begonia petrensis C.Y.Ling & S.Julia
- Begonia phamiana Kiew
- Begonia phantasma Tebbitt
- Begonia philodendroides Ziesenh.
- Begonia phoeniogramma Ridl.
- Begonia phouchomvoyensis Lanors., Lamxay & Souvann.
- Begonia phrixophylla Blatt. & McCann
- Begonia phuthoensis H.Q.Nguyen
- Begonia phutthaii M.Hughes
- Begonia phycoduroides C.W.Lin
- Begonia phyllomaniaca Mart.
- Begonia physandra Merr. & L.M.Perry
- Begonia pickelii Irmsch.
- Begonia picta Sm.
- Begonia pierrei Gagnep.
- Begonia pilgeriana Irmsch.
- Begonia pilosa Jack
- Begonia pinetorum A.DC.
- Begonia pingbianensis Idrees & J.M.H.Shaw
- Begonia pinglinensis C.I Peng
- Begonia pingxiangensis W.G.Wang, F.Y.Nong & H.C.Xi
- Begonia pinheironis L.B.Sm. ex S.F.Sm. & Wassh.
- Begonia pinnatifida Merr. & L.M.Perry
- Begonia pinulon Mazo & Rubite
- Begonia piranga L.Kollmann & Gonella
- Begonia piraquara E.L.Jacques
- Begonia piresiana Handro
- Begonia piring Kiew & S.Julia
- Begonia pitopangii D.C.Thomas & Ardi
- Begonia piurensis L.B.Sm. & B.G.Schub.
- Begonia plantaginea L.B.Sm. & B.G.Schub.
- Begonia platanifolia Schott
- Begonia platycarpa Y.M.Shui & W.H.Chen
- Begonia platyphylla Merr.
- Begonia platyptera Urb.
- Begonia plebeja Liebm.
- Begonia pleioclada Irmsch.
- Begonia pleiopetala A.DC.
- Begonia plieranensis S.Julia & C.Y.Ling
- Begonia plumieri Kunth
- Begonia pluvialis L.B.Sm. ex S.F.Sm. & Wassh.
- Begonia poculifera Hook.f.
- Begonia poilanei Kiew
- Begonia polilloensis Tebbitt
- Begonia polyandra Irmsch.
- Begonia polyclada C.I Peng, C.W.Lin & Rubite
- Begonia polygonata Liebm.
- Begonia polygonifolia A.DC.
- Begonia polygonoides Hook.f.
- Begonia polypetala A.DC.
- Begonia polytricha C.Y.Wu
- Begonia popenoei Standl.
- Begonia porteana Van Geert
- Begonia porteri H.Lév. & Vaniot
- Begonia portillana S.Watson
- Begonia postarii Kiew
- Begonia potamophila Gilg
- Begonia praerupta Irmsch.
- Begonia praetermissa Kiew
- Begonia prasinimarginata S.Julia
- Begonia preussii Warb.
- Begonia prieurii A.DC.
- Begonia princeae Gilg
- Begonia princeps (Klotzsch) A.DC.
- Begonia pringlei S.Watson
- Begonia prionota D.C.Thomas & Ardi
- Begonia prismatocarpa Hook.
- Begonia procridifolia Wall. ex A.DC.
- Begonia prolifera A.DC.
- Begonia promethea Ridl.
- Begonia propinqua Ridl.
- Begonia pruinata (Klotzsch) A.DC.
- Begonia pryeriana Ridl.
- Begonia pseudobrandisiana Souvann. & Lanors.
- Begonia pseudodaedalea P.D.McMillan & Rekha Morris
- Begonia pseudodaxinensis S.M.Ku, Yan Liu & C.I Peng
- Begonia pseudodendron Moonlight & Á.J.Pérez
- Begonia pseudodryadis C.Y.Wu
- Begonia pseudoedulis D.K.Tian, X.X.Feng & R.K.Li
- Begonia pseudoheydei Y.M.Shui & W.H.Chen
- Begonia pseudoleprosa C.I Peng, Yan Liu & S.M.Ku
- Begonia pseudolubbersii Brade
- Begonia pseudomaurandiae Tebbitt
- Begonia pseudomuricata Girm.
- Begonia pseudopeltata Burt-Utley & Utley
- Begonia pseudopleiopetala Tebbitt
- Begonia pseudoscottii Girm.
- Begonia pseudosubperfoliata Phutthai & M.Hughes
- Begonia pseudoviola Gilg
- Begonia psilophylla Irmsch.
- Begonia pteridiformis Phutthai
- Begonia pteridoides Scherber. & Duruiss.
- Begonia puberula Sosef
- Begonia pubescens Ridl.
- Begonia pudica L.B.Sm. & B.G.Schub.
- Begonia puerensis W.G.Wang, X.D.Ma & J.Y.Shen
- Begonia pulchella Raddi
- Begonia pulcherrima Sosef
- Begonia pulchra (Ridl.) L.L.Forrest & Hollingsw.
- Begonia pulchrifolia D.K.Tian & Ce H.Li
- Begonia pululahuana C.DC.
- Begonia pulvinifera C.I Peng & Yan Liu
- Begonia pumila Craib
- Begonia pumilio Irmsch.
- Begonia punbatuensis Kiew
- Begonia punchak Kiew & S.Julia
- Begonia purdieana A.DC.
- Begonia purpusii Houghton ex Ziesenh.
- Begonia puspitae Ardi
- Begonia pustulata Liebm.
- Begonia puttii Craib
- Begonia pycnantha Urb. & Ekman
- Begonia pygmaea Irmsch.
- Begonia pyramidata D.K.Tian, T.S.Hoang, W.G.Wang & B.Chen
- Begonia pyrrha Ridl.

== Q ==
- Begonia qianchuanensis D.K.Tian & Z.L.Chen
- Begonia qingchengshanensis H.Z.Li, C.I Peng & C.W.Lin
- Begonia qinzhouensis D.K.Tian & J.Y.Zhou
- Begonia quadrialata Warb.
- Begonia quadripetiolata Aver. & H.Q.Nguyen
- Begonia quangnamensis C.H.Nguyen, V.H.Bui & C.W.Lin
- Begonia quaternata L.B.Sm. & B.G.Schub.
- Begonia quercifolia A.DC.
- Begonia quinquealata C.I Peng & Rubite & C.W.Lin

== R ==
- Begonia rabilii Craib
- Begonia racemiflora Ortgies ex C.Chev.
- Begonia racemosa Jack
- Begonia rachmatii Tebbitt
- Begonia radicans Vell.
- Begonia rafael-torresii Burt-Utley
- Begonia raimondii Irmsch.
- Begonia rajah Ridl.
- Begonia rambaiensis Kiew
- Begonia rambutan Rimi
- Begonia ramentacea Paxton
- Begonia ramlanii Rimi & Handry
- Begonia ramosii Merr.
- Begonia ramosissima Kiew & S.Julia
- Begonia ranaiensis Girm.
- Begonia randiana Merr. & L.M.Perry
- Begonia ranoposoensis Saleh, Bandjolu & Ardi
- Begonia rantemarioensis D.C.Thomas & Ardi
- Begonia raoensis M.Hughes
- Begonia ravenii C.I.Peng & Y.K.Chen
- Begonia razafinjohanyi Aymonin & Bosser
- Begonia recurvata Girm. & M.Hughes
- Begonia reflexisquamosa C.Y.Wu
- Begonia reginula Kiew
- Begonia × reichenheimii G. Bartsch
- Begonia relicta L.B.Sm. & B.G.Schub.
- Begonia remusatifolia Y.M.Shui & W.H.Chen
- Begonia renek Rimi
- Begonia reniformis Dryand.
- Begonia renqinbengensis D.K.Tian & W.G.Wang
- Begonia repens Lam.
- Begonia repenticaulis Irmsch.
- Begonia reptans Benth.
- Begonia retakensis (Sands) Joffre
- Begonia retinervia D.Fang, D.H.Qin & C.I Peng
- Begonia retusa O.E.Schulz
- Begonia rex Putz.
- Begonia rheifolia Irmsch.
- Begonia rheophytica M.Hughes
- Begonia rhizocaulis (Klotzsch) A.DC.
- Begonia rhodantha Ridl.
- Begonia rhodocarpa C.Y.Ling & S.Julia
- Begonia rhodochaeta S.Julia & Kiew
- Begonia rhodochlamys L.B.Sm. & B.G.Schub.
- Begonia rhodoneura S.Julia
- Begonia rhodotricha S.Julia & C.Y.Ling
- Begonia rhoephila Ridl.
- Begonia rhombipetala S.Julia & C.Y.Ling
- Begonia rhyacophila Kiew
- Begonia rhynchocarpa Y.M.Shui & W.H.Chen
- Begonia rhytidophylla Y.M.Shui & W.H.Chen
- Begonia rieckei Warb.
- Begonia riedelii A.DC.
- Begonia rigida (Klotzsch) Regel ex A.DC.
- Begonia rigidifolia Aver.
- Begonia riparia Irmsch.
- Begonia rivularis E.L.Jacques
- Begonia rizalensis Merr.
- Begonia robii Ardi & Girm.
- Begonia robusta Blume
- Begonia rockii Irmsch.
- Begonia rolandfadlii Dayanti, Pitopang & D.C.Thomas
- Begonia rongjiangensis T.C.Ku
- Begonia rosacea Putz.
- Begonia roseibractea Ziesenh.
- Begonia roseopunctata Kiew
- Begonia rossmanniae A.DC.
- Begonia rostrata Welw. ex Hook.f.
- Begonia rotunda Vell.
- Begonia rotundibracteata Kiew
- Begonia rotundifolia Lam.
- Begonia rotundilimba S.H.Huang & Y.M.Shui
- Begonia roxburghii A.DC.
- Begonia rubella Buch.-Ham. ex D.Don
- Begonia rubida Ridl.
- Begonia rubinea Hong Z.Li & H.Ma
- Begonia rubiteae M.Hughes
- Begonia ruboides C.M.Hu
- Begonia rubricaulis Hook.
- Begonia rubriflora L.Kollmann
- Begonia rubrifolia Merr.
- Begonia rubrobracteolata S.Julia & C.Y.Ling
- Begonia rubroflabellata C.W.Lin & T.C.Hsu
- Begonia rubromarginata Gilg
- Begonia rubronervata De Wild.
- Begonia rubropilosa A.DC.
- Begonia rubropunctata S.H.Huang & Y.M.Shui
- Begonia rubrosetosa Aver.
- Begonia rubrotepala S.Julia
- Begonia ruchengensis D.K.Tian
- Begonia rufa Thunb.
- Begonia rufipila Merr.
- Begonia rufosericea Toledo
- Begonia rugosula Aver.
- Begonia ruhlandiana Irmsch.
- Begonia rumpiensis Kupicha
- Begonia rupium Irmsch.
- Begonia ruschii L.Kollmann
- Begonia rushforthii Wahlsteen & D.Borah
- Begonia russelliana L.B.Sm. ex S.F.Sm. & Wassh.
- Begonia ruthiae S.Julia
- Begonia rutilans (Klotzsch) A.DC.
- Begonia rwandensis J.C.Arends

== S ==
- Begonia sabahensis Kiew & J.H.Tan
- Begonia sabriana Tawan, Ipor & Meekiong
- Begonia sadirensis Kiew & S.Julia
- Begonia sadtataiana Randi & M.Hughes
- Begonia sagaingensis Y.H.Tan, M.B.Maw & H.B.Ding
- Begonia sageaensis Wiriad.
- Begonia salaziensis (Gaudich.) Warb.
- Begonia salesopolensis S.J.Gomes da Silva & Mamede
- Begonia salicifolia A.DC.
- Begonia salisburyana Irmsch.
- Begonia samarensis Merr.
- Begonia sambiranensis Humbert ex Aymonin & Bosser
- Begonia samhaensis M.Hughes & A.G.Mill.
- Begonia sandalifolia C.B.Clarke
- Begonia sandaunensis H.P.Wilson & Jimbo
- Begonia sandsiana W.N.Takeuchi
- Begonia sandtii Houghton ex Ziesenh.
- Begonia sangkulirangensis Ardi, Girm. & Randi
- Begonia sanguinea Raddi
- Begonia sanguineopilosa D.C.Thomas & Ardi
- Begonia santarosensis Kuntze
- Begonia santos-limae Brade
- Begonia saolaensis Y.M.Shui, T.A.Le & C.T.Vu
- Begonia sarangica Kiew & S.Julia
- Begonia sarasinorum Irmsch.
- Begonia sarawakensis Ridl.
- Begonia sarmentacea Brilmayer
- Begonia sarmentosa L.B.Sm. & Wassh.
- Begonia sartorii Liebm.
- Begonia satelloides Y.M.Shui, H.Q.Nguyen & W.H.Chen
- Begonia satrapis C.B.Clarke
- Begonia saxicola A.DC.
- Begonia saxifraga A.DC.
- Begonia saxifragifolia Craib
- Begonia saxifragoides T.N.Bon & C.W.Lin
- Begonia scabrida A.DC.
- Begonia scabrifolia C.I Peng, Yan Liu & C.W.Lin
- Begonia scapigera Hook.f.
- Begonia schaeferi Engl.
- Begonia scharffiana Regel
- Begonia schizostyla M.D.Miranda
- Begonia schliebenii Irmsch.
- Begonia schulziana Urb. & Ekman
- Begonia sciaphila Gilg ex Engl.
- Begonia scintillans Dunn
- Begonia scitifolia Irmsch.
- Begonia scorpiocaulis Moonlight & Tebbitt
- Begonia scorpiuroloba D.K.Tian & Q.Tian
- Begonia scortechinii King
- Begonia scottii Tebbitt
- Begonia scutifolia Hook.f.
- Begonia scutulum Hook.f.
- Begonia sebodensis Mazo & Rubite
- Begonia seemanniana A.DC.
- Begonia segerakensis C.Y.Ling & Kiew
- Begonia segregata L.B.Sm. & B.G.Schub.
- Begonia sekuanensis C.Y.Ling & S.Julia
- Begonia semidigitata Brade
- Begonia semilunata Aver.
- Begonia semiovata Liebm.
- Begonia semiparietalis Yan Liu, S.M.Ku & C.I Peng
- Begonia semongkatensis Girm.
- Begonia sendangensis Ardi
- Begonia serapatensis Kiew & S.Julia
- Begonia serianensis C.W.Lin & C.I Peng
- Begonia sericoneura Liebm.
- Begonia serotina A.DC.
- Begonia serpens Merr.
- Begonia serranegrae L.B.Sm. ex S.F.Sm. & Wassh.
- Begonia serraticauda Merr. & L.M.Perry
- Begonia serratipetala Irmsch.
- Begonia serratistipula Moonlight
- Begonia sessilifolia Hook.f.
- Begonia sessilifructa S.Julia & Kiew
- Begonia setiamensis S.Julia & Kiew
- Begonia setifolia Irmsch.
- Begonia setulosa Bertol.
- Begonia setulosopeltata C.Y.Wu
- Begonia seychellensis Hemsl.
- Begonia shaoqingii D.K.Tian & J.Y.Zhou
- Begonia sharpeana F.Muell.
- Begonia shenzhenensis D.K.Tian & X.Yun Wang
- Begonia shilendrae Rekha Morris & P.D.McMillan
- Begonia shitoushanensis S.S.Ying
- Begonia shoukaensis S.S.Ying
- Begonia shunanensis D.K.Tian
- Begonia shunzhii D.K.Tian, Z.Y.Guo & X.X.Bai
- Begonia siamensis Gagnep.
- Begonia sibthorpioides Ridl.
- Begonia sibutensis Sands
- Begonia siccacaudata J.Door.
- Begonia sidolensis Dayanti, Pitopang & Ardi
- Begonia sikkimensis A.DC.
- Begonia silletensis (A.DC.) C.B.Clarke
- Begonia silverstonei Jara
- Begonia simolapensis Ardi
- Begonia simulans Merr. & L.M.Perry
- Begonia simunii Rimi
- Begonia sinofloribunda Dorr
- Begonia sinopicturata Idrees & J.M.H.Shaw
- Begonia sinovietnamica C.Y.Wu
- Begonia sinuata Wall. ex Meisn.
- Begonia siregarii Ardi & D.C.Thomas
- Begonia sirindhorniana Phutthai, Thananth., Srisom & Suddee
- Begonia sirukitii S.Julia & C.Y.Ling
- Begonia skutchii Burt-Utley & Utley
- Begonia sleumeri L.B.Sm. & B.G.Schub.
- Begonia smithiae Geddes
- Begonia smithiana T.T.Yu ex Irmsch.
- Begonia socotrana Hook.f.
- Begonia sogerensis Ridl.
- Begonia sohoton Rubite, C.Justo, P.Villaseñor & C.W.Lin
- Begonia sojolensis D.C.Thomas & Ardi
- Begonia solaniflora Jara
- Begonia solimutata L.B.Sm. & Wassh.
- Begonia solitudinis Brade
- Begonia soluta Craib
- Begonia somervillei Hemsl.
- Begonia sonderiana Irmsch.
- Begonia sordidissima Elmer
- Begonia sosefiana J.J.de Wilde & Valk.
- Begonia sousae Burt-Utley
- Begonia sparreana L.B.Sm. & Wassh.
- Begonia sparsipila Baker
- Begonia speculum Moonlight & Tebbitt
- Begonia speluncae Ridl.
- Begonia sphenantheroides C.I Peng
- Begonia sphenocarpa Irmsch.
- Begonia spilotophylla F.Muell.
- Begonia spinibarbis Irmsch.
- Begonia squamipes Irmsch.
- Begonia squamulosa Hook.f.
- Begonia squarrosa Liebm.
- Begonia staudtii Gilg
- Begonia stellata Sosef
- Begonia stenocardia L.B.Sm. & B.G.Schub.
- Begonia stenogyna Sands
- Begonia stenolepis L.B.Sm. & R.C.Sm.
- Begonia stenotepala L.B.Sm. & B.G.Schub.
- Begonia stevei M.Hughes
- Begonia steyermarkii L.B.Sm. & B.G.Schub.
- Begonia stichochaete K.G.Pearce
- Begonia stictopoda (Miq.) Miq. ex A.DC.
- Begonia stigmosa Lindl.
- Begonia stilandra Merr. & L.M.Perry
- Begonia stilpnophylla D.C.Thomas & Ardi
- Begonia stipularis Spreng.
- Begonia stolzii Irmsch.
- Begonia strachwitzii Warb. ex Irmsch.
- Begonia strictinervis Irmsch.
- Begonia strictipetiolaris Irmsch.
- Begonia strigillosa A.Dietr.
- Begonia strigosa (Warb.) L.L.Forrest & Hollingsw.
- Begonia strigulosa (Hassk.) A.DC.
- Begonia suaviola Jara
- Begonia subacida Irmsch.
- Begonia subacutata De Wild.
- Begonia subaequifolia Y.P.Ang & J.Collantes
- Begonia subalpestris A.Chev.
- Begonia subcaudata Rusby ex L.B.Sm. & Schub.
- Begonia subcoriacea C.I Peng, Yan Liu & S.M.Ku
- Begonia subcostata Rusby
- Begonia subcyclophylla Irmsch.
- Begonia subelliptica Merr. & L.M.Perry
- Begonia subfiliformis D.K.Tian & J.Y.Zhou
- Begonia subhowii S.H.Huang
- Begonia subisensis K.G.Pearce
- Begonia sublobata Jack
- Begonia sublongipes Y.M.Shui
- Begonia subnummulariifolia Merr.
- Begonia suboblata D.Fang & D.H.Qin
- Begonia suborbiculata Merr.
- Begonia subpeltata Wight
- Begonia subperfoliata Parish ex Kurz
- Begonia subprostrata Merr.
- Begonia subscutata De Wild.
- Begonia subspinulosa Irmsch.
- Begonia subtruncata Merr.
- Begonia subvillosa Klotzsch
- Begonia subviridis Craib
- Begonia sudjanae C.-A.Jansson
- Begonia suffrutescens Merr. & L.M.Perry
- Begonia sui T.S.Hoang, D.K.Tian & B.Chen
- Begonia sukutensis Burt-Utley & Utley
- Begonia sumbawaensis Girm.
- Begonia summoglabra T.T.Yu
- Begonia sunorchis C.Chev.
- Begonia superciliaris C.W.Lin & C.I Peng
- Begonia surculigera Kurz
- Begonia susaniae Sosef
- Begonia sutherlandii Hook.f.
- Begonia suyeniae C.W.Lin
- Begonia sychnantha L.B.Sm. & Wassh.
- Begonia sykakiengii Rubite, C.I Peng, C.W.Lin & K.F.Chung
- Begonia sylvatica A.DC.
- Begonia sylvestris A.DC.
- Begonia symbracteosa L.L.Forrest & Hollingsw.
- Begonia symgeraniifolia L.L.Forrest & Hollingsw.
- Begonia symhirta L.L.Forrest & Hollingsw.
- Begonia sympapuana L.L.Forrest & Hollingsw.
- Begonia symparvifolia L.L.Forrest & Hollingsw.
- Begonia sympodialis Irmsch.
- Begonia symsanguinea L.L.Forrest & Hollingsw.

== T ==
- Begonia tabonensis C.I Peng & Rubite & C.W.Lin
- Begonia tacana Ziesenh.
- Begonia tafaensis Merr. & L.M.Perry
- Begonia tafiensis Lillo
- Begonia tagbanua M.Hughes, C.I Peng & Rubite
- Begonia × taipeiensis C.I.Peng
- Begonia taiwaniana Hayata
- Begonia taliensis Gagnep.
- Begonia taligera S.Rajbh.
- Begonia tambelanensis (Irmsch.) Kiew
- Begonia tamdaoensis C.I Peng
- Begonia tamoiana E.L.Jacques & Moonlight
- Begonia tampinica Burkill ex Irmsch.
- Begonia tanala Humbert
- Begonia tanauanensis Tandang, Bucay, K.F.Chung
- Begonia tandangii C.I.Peng & Rubite
- Begonia tandikan Pranada, Camangeg, W.Caban. & Y.P.Ang
- Begonia tanggamusensis Girm. & M.Hughes
- Begonia taniana Guanih
- Begonia tanjiewhoei Phutthai & M.Hughes
- Begonia tapatia Burt-Utley & McVaugh
- Begonia tarangban Rubite, C.Justo, P.Villaseñor & C.W.Lin
- Begonia taraw C.I Peng, Rubite & M.Hughes
- Begonia tatianae Aver.
- Begonia tatoniana R.Wilczek
- Begonia tawaensis Merr.
- Begonia tayabensis Merr.
- Begonia tayloriana Irmsch.
- Begonia tebiang S.Julia & Kiew
- Begonia temburongensis Sands
- Begonia tenasserimensis Phutthai & M.Hughes
- Begonia tenera Dryand.
- Begonia tenericaulis Ridl.
- Begonia tengchiana C.I Peng & Y.K.Chen
- Begonia tenuibracteata C.I Peng & Rubite & C.W.Lin
- Begonia tenuifolia Dryand.
- Begonia tenuis Burt-Utley & Utley
- Begonia tenuissima S.Julia & C.Y.Ling
- Begonia tepuiensis Moonlight & Jara
- Begonia tessaricarpa C.B.Clarke
- Begonia tesselata Jara & H.Caro
- Begonia tetralobata Y.M.Shui
- Begonia tetrandra Irmsch.
- Begonia teuscheri Linden ex André
- Begonia teysmanniana (Miq.) Miq. ex B.D.Jacks.
- Begonia thaipingensis King
- Begonia thansaensis D.K.Tian, T.S.Hoang & W.G.Wang
- Begonia thanhquyetii C.H. Nguyen, T.A. Le & C.W. Lin
- Begonia thelmae L.B.Sm. & Wassh.
- Begonia thiemei C.DC.
- Begonia thomeana C.DC.
- Begonia thomsonii A.DC.
- Begonia thuanchauensis C.H.Nguyen, V.H.Bui & C.W.Lin
- Begonia thyrsoidea Irmsch.
- Begonia tianbaoensis W.G.Wang & R.K.Li
- Begonia tigrina Kiew
- Begonia tiliifolia C.DC.
- Begonia timorensis (Miq.) Golding & Kareg.
- Begonia tinctoria L.B.Sm. & B.G.Schub.
- Begonia tindan Rimi & Kinahim
- Begonia tinjanii S.Julia
- Begonia tinuyopensis Mazo, Aribal, R.Bustam. & Y.P.Ang
- Begonia tiradpassensis Calaramo, Rubite & C.W.Lin
- Begonia titoevangelistae Tandang & Rubite
- Begonia tjiasmantoi Ardi & D.C.Thomas
- Begonia tlapensis Burt-Utley & Utley
- Begonia togashii Nob.Tanaka & C.I Peng
- Begonia toledana L.B.Sm. & B.G.Schub.
- Begonia toledoana Handro
- Begonia tomaniensis Rimi
- Begonia tomentosa Schott
- Begonia tonduzii C.DC. ex T.Durand & Pittier
- Begonia tonkinensis Gagnep.
- Begonia torajana D.C.Thomas & Ardi
- Begonia torricellensis Warb.
- Begonia trevisoensis J.C.Jaramillo
- Begonia trianae (A.DC.) Warb.
- Begonia triangularis Kiew & C.Y.Ling
- Begonia tribenensis C.R.Rao
- Begonia trichocarpa Dalzell
- Begonia trichochila Warb.
- Begonia trichopoda (Miq.) Miq.
- Begonia trichosepala C.DC. ex Donn.Sm.
- Begonia tricuspidata C.B.Clarke
- Begonia triginticollium Girm.
- Begonia trigonocarpa Ridl.
- Begonia tripartifolia Souvann. & Lanors.
- Begonia tripicoensis E.L.Jacques
- Begonia tripurensis Dix.Bora, B.K.Datta & D.Borah
- Begonia triradiata C.B.Clarke
- Begonia triramosa Irmsch.
- Begonia trispathulata (A.DC.) Warb.
- Begonia tropaeolifolia A.DC.
- Begonia trujillensis L.B.Sm.
- Begonia trullifolia Guillaumin
- Begonia truncatifolia R.A.Bustam., Tandang, Pranada & Y.P.Ang
- Begonia truncatiloba Irmsch.
- Begonia truncicola Sodiro ex C.DC.
- Begonia tsaratananensis Aymonin & Bosser
- Begonia tsimihety Humbert
- Begonia tsoongii C.Y.Wu
- Begonia tuanii T.S.Hoang & C.W.Lin
- Begonia tuberculosa Girm.
- Begonia tui T.N.Bon & C.W.Lin
- Begonia tumbezensis Irmsch.
- Begonia tumburanoensis D.C.Thomas & Ardi
- Begonia tungyanshanensis S.S.Ying
- Begonia turrialbae Burt-Utley & Utley
- Begonia turugsoy Mazo & Rubite

== U ==
- Begonia ubahribuensis S.Julia & Kiew
- Begonia udisilvestris C.DC.
- Begonia ufoides C.I Peng, Y.H.Qin & C.W.Lin
- Begonia ulmifolia Willd.
- Begonia umbellata Kunth
- Begonia umbraculifera Hook.f.
- Begonia umbraculifolia Y.Wan & B.N.Chang
- Begonia umbratica S.Julia
- Begonia umbrosa M.D.Miranda & E.L.Jacques
- Begonia unduavensis Rusby
- Begonia undulata Schott
- Begonia uniflora S.Watson
- Begonia unilateralis Rusby
- Begonia urdanetensis Elmer
- Begonia urophylla Hook.
- Begonia ursina L.B.Sm. & B.G.Schub.
- Begonia urticae L.f.
- Begonia uruapensis Sessé & Moc.
- Begonia urubambensis Tebbitt
- Begonia urunensis Kiew

== V ==
- Begonia vaccinioides Sands
- Begonia vagans Craib
- Begonia valdensium A.DC.
- Begonia vallicola Kiew
- Begonia valvata L.B.Sm. & B.G.Schub.
- Begonia vanderentii Rossiti
- Begonia vandewateri Ridl.
- Begonia vankerckhovenii De Wild.
- Begonia vanoverberghii Merr.
- Begonia vareschii Irmsch.
- Begonia vargasii Moonlight
- Begonia variabilis Ridl.
- Begonia variegata Y.M.Shui & W.H.Chen
- Begonia variifolia Y.M.Shui & W.H.Chen
- Begonia varipeltata D.C.Thomas
- Begonia varistyla Irmsch.
- Begonia vasconcelosiana L.Kollmann
- Begonia veitchii Hook.f.
- Begonia velata L.B.Sm. & B.G.Schub.
- Begonia venosa Skan ex Hook.f.
- Begonia venusta King
- Begonia verecunda M.Hughes
- Begonia vermeulenii D.C.Thomas
- Begonia verruculosa L.B.Sm.
- Begonia versicolor Irmsch.
- Begonia verticillata Vell.
- Begonia vespipropinqua Chong
- Begonia vestita C.DC.
- Begonia vicina Irmsch.
- Begonia vietnamensis H.Q.Nguyen & C.I Peng
- Begonia villifolia Irmsch.
- Begonia villosula T.S.Hoang & C.W.Lin
- Begonia vinagrera Jara & Zabala
- Begonia vincentina O.E.Schulz
- Begonia vinkii Sands
- Begonia violifolia A.DC.
- Begonia viriditenebris Lanors. & Souvann.
- Begonia viscida Ziesenh.
- Begonia viscosa Aver.
- Begonia vitiensis A.C.Sm.
- Begonia vittariifolia N.Hallé
- Begonia vivipara Aver., Nuraliev & Y.M.Shui
- Begonia voluptuaria Lanors., Souvann. & Lamxay
- Begonia vonhaiensis T.S.Hoang, D.K.Tian & W.G.Wang
- Begonia vuijckii Koord.
- Begonia vulgarioides S.Julia&Kiew
- Begonia vulgaris S.Julia&Kiew

== W ==
- Begonia wadei Merr. & Quisumb.
- Begonia wageneriana (Klotzsch) Hook.
- Begonia wahehe A.Bianchi, L.Angelini & Q.Luke
- Begonia wakefieldii Gilg ex Engl.
- Begonia wallacei C. W. Lin & C. -I Peng
- Begonia wallichiana Lehm.
- Begonia walteriana Irmsch.
- Begonia wangii T.T.Yu
- Begonia warburgii K.Schum. & Lauterb.
- Begonia wariana Irmsch.
- Begonia wasshauseniana L.Kollmann & Peixoto
- Begonia watsonii Sherpa, Lepcha, Chhetri & Gogoi
- Begonia wattii C.B.Clarke
- Begonia watuwilensis Girm.
- Begonia weberbaueri Irmsch.
- Begonia weberi Merr.
- Begonia weberlingii Irmsch. ex Weberling
- Begonia weddelliana A.DC.
- Begonia weigallii Hemsl.
- Begonia wengeri C.E.C.Fisch.
- Begonia wenshanensis C.M.Hu
- Begonia wenzelii Merr.
- Begonia wiformis T.S.Hoang & C.W.Lin
- Begonia wilburi Burt-Utley & Utley
- Begonia wilkiei Coyle
- Begonia wilksii Sosef
- Begonia willemii Ardi, Girm. & D.C.Thomas
- Begonia wilsonii Gagnep.
- Begonia windischii L.B.Sm. ex S.F.Sm. & Wassh.
- Begonia wollastonii Baker f.
- Begonia wollnyi Herzog
- Begonia woodii Merr.
- Begonia wrayi Hemsl.
- Begonia wrightiana A.DC.
- Begonia wui-senioris C.I. Peng
- Begonia wumingensis J.Y.Zhou, S.K.Guan & D.K.Tian
- Begonia wutaiana C.I Peng & Y.K.Chen
- Begonia wuzhishanensis C.-I. Peng, X.H. Jin & S.M. Ku
- Begonia wyepingiana Kiew

== X ==
- Begonia xanthina Hook.
- Begonia xenos C.W.Lin, Phonep. & P.Rahm
- Begonia xilitlensis Burt-Utley
- Begonia xingyiensis T.C.Ku
- Begonia xiphophylla Irmsch.
- Begonia xiphophylloides Kiew.
- Begonia xishuangbannaensis W.G.Wang & L.J.Jiang
- Begonia xishuiensis T.C.Ku
- Begonia xochiatencana J.R.Santiago
- Begonia xuansonensis T.V.Do, Nuraliev & Y.M.Shui
- Begonia xylopoda L.B.Sm. & B.G.Schub.

== Y ==
- Begonia yapenensis M.Hughes
- Begonia yappii Ridl.
- Begonia yentuensis Luu & C.W.Lin
- Begonia yenyeniae J.P.C.Tan
- Begonia yiii Kiew & S.Julia
- Begonia yingjiangensis S.H.Huang
- Begonia yishanensis T.C.Ku
- Begonia yizhouensis D.K.Tian, B.M.Wang & Y.Tong
- Begonia yui Irmsch.
- Begonia yunckeri Standl.
- Begonia yuracyacuensis Moonlight

== Z ==
- Begonia zairensis Sosef
- Begonia zamboangensis Merr.
- Begonia zenkeriana L.B.Sm. & Wassh.
- Begonia zhengyiana Y.M.Shui
- Begonia zhongyangiana W.G.Wang & S.Z.Zhang
- Begonia zhuhaiensis D.K.Tian
- Begonia zhuoyuniae C.I Peng, Yan Liu & K.F.Chung
- Begonia zimmermannii Peter ex Irmsch.
- Begonia ziroensis Borah et al
- Begonia zollingeriana (Klotzsch) A.DC.
- Begonia zonata C.W.Lin & C.H.Nguyen
- Begonia zunyiensis S.Z.He & Y.M.Shui
- Begonia zygia C.W.Lin & C.I Peng
