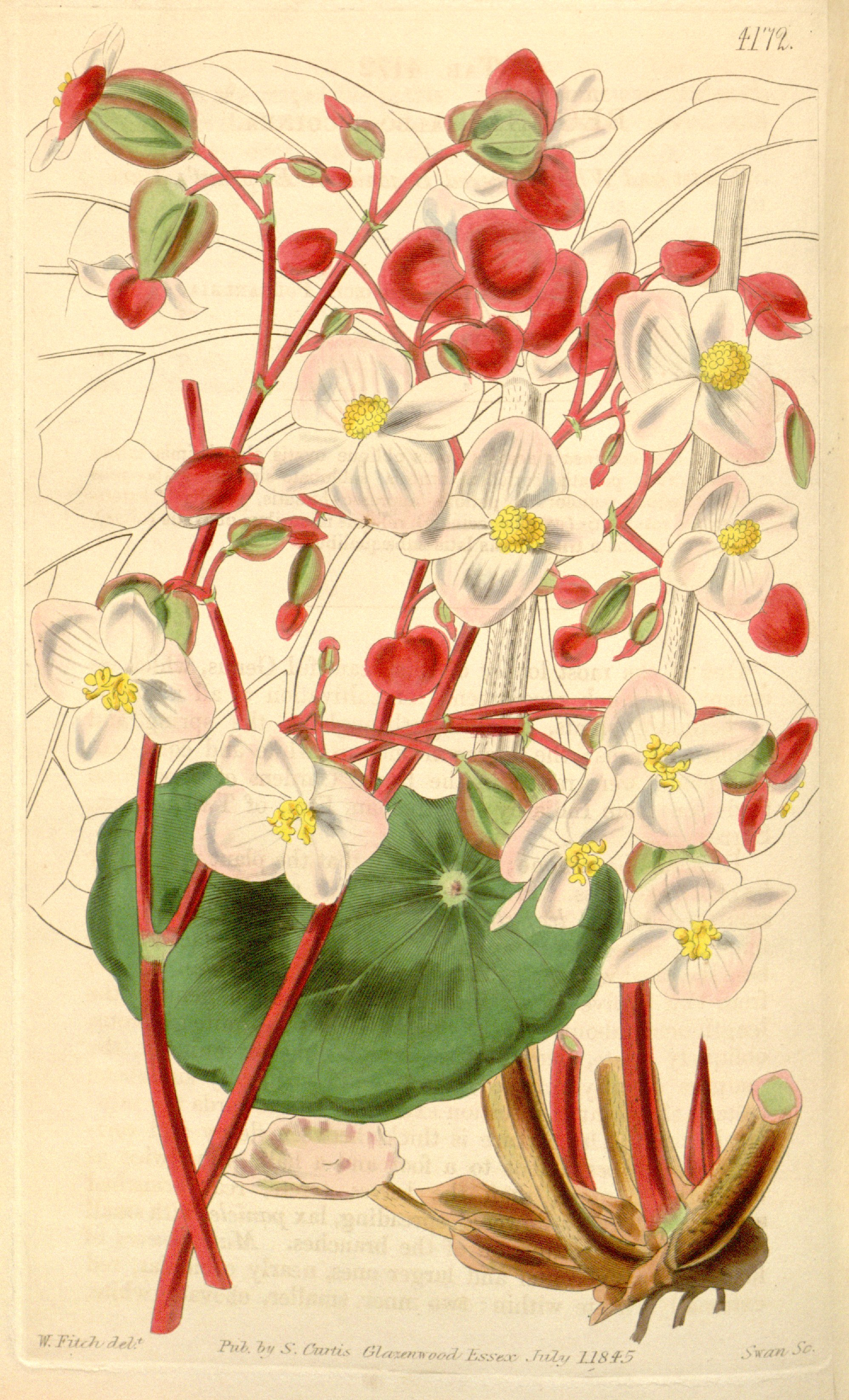

Scientific classification
- Kingdom: Plantae
- Clade: Tracheophytes
- Clade: Angiosperms
- Clade: Eudicots
- Clade: Rosids
- Order: Cucurbitales
- Family: Begoniaceae
- Genus: Begonia
- Species: B. albococcinea

Binomial name
- Begonia albococcinea Hook.

= Begonia albococcinea =

Species of flowering plant

Begonia albococcinea is a species of plant in the family Begoniaceae.

== Description ==
The species has stout, fleshy, dark brown cylindrical rhizomes with roots arising on all sides. Leaf scars and internodes (10–15 cm long) are distinct, with stipules visible near the nodes and numerous root hairs present. Petioles are reddish, angled, hairy, and about 15 cm long. Leaves are nearly round and peltate, measuring 6–8 × 7–10 cm, thick and dorsifixed, green above and pale reddish-green beneath, with 5–6 palmate veins radiating from the centre.

== Distribution ==
In the evergreen forests of Southern Western Ghats, towards the southernmost parts of Kerala and Tamil Nadu.
