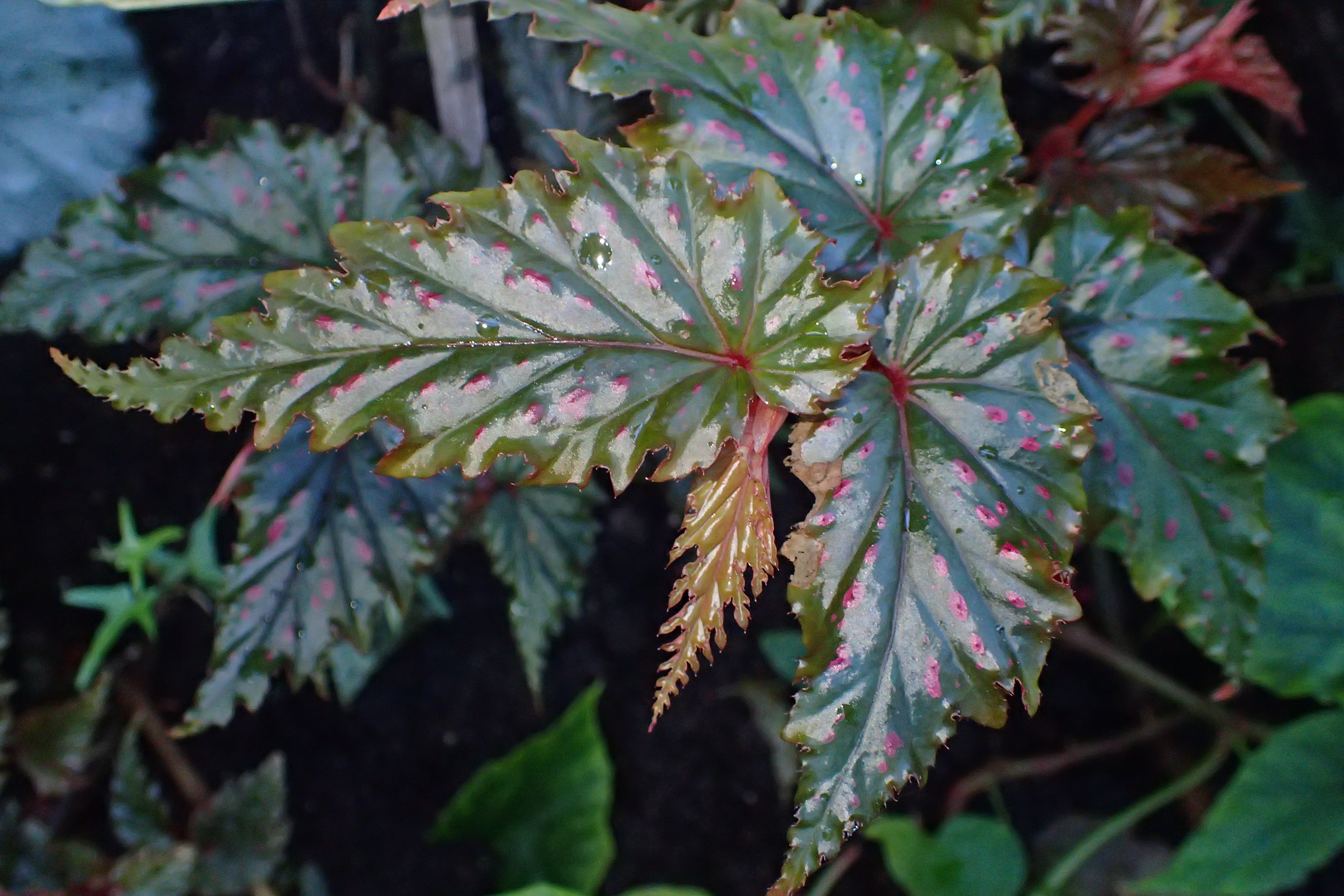
- Foliage

Scientific classification
- Kingdom: Plantae
- Clade: Tracheophytes
- Clade: Angiosperms
- Clade: Eudicots
- Clade: Rosids
- Order: Cucurbitales
- Family: Begoniaceae
- Genus: Begonia
- Species: B. serratipetala

Binomial name
- Begonia serratipetala Irmsch.

= Begonia serratipetala =

Species of flowering plant

Begonia serratipetala is a species of flowering plant in the genus Begonia, native to New Guinea. It has gained the Royal Horticultural Society's Award of Garden Merit.
