= Begonia francisabuidii =

Scientific classification
- Kingdom: Plantae
- Clade: Tracheophytes
- Clade: Angiosperms
- Clade: Eudicots
- Clade: Rosids
- Order: Cucurbitales
- Family: Begoniaceae
- Genus: Begonia
- Species: B. francisabuidii

Binomial name
- Begonia francisabuidii dela Cruz, Conception & Y.P.Ang

Species of flowering plant

Begonia francisabuidii is a species of flowering plant in the family Begoniaceae, native to the Philippines, with specimens spotted in Albay. It is characterized by reddish wood and white flowers. It is named after Francis Abuid, a Filipino biologist who died in a vehicular accident in 2021.
