= Begonia rheifolia =

Scientific classification
- Kingdom: Plantae
- Clade: Tracheophytes
- Clade: Angiosperms
- Clade: Eudicots
- Clade: Rosids
- Order: Cucurbitales
- Family: Begoniaceae
- Genus: Begonia
- Species: B. rheifolia

Binomial name
- Begonia rheifolia Ridl.

Species of flowering plant

Begonia rheifolia is a species of plant in the family Begoniaceae. It is endemic to Pahang in Peninsular Malaysia.
