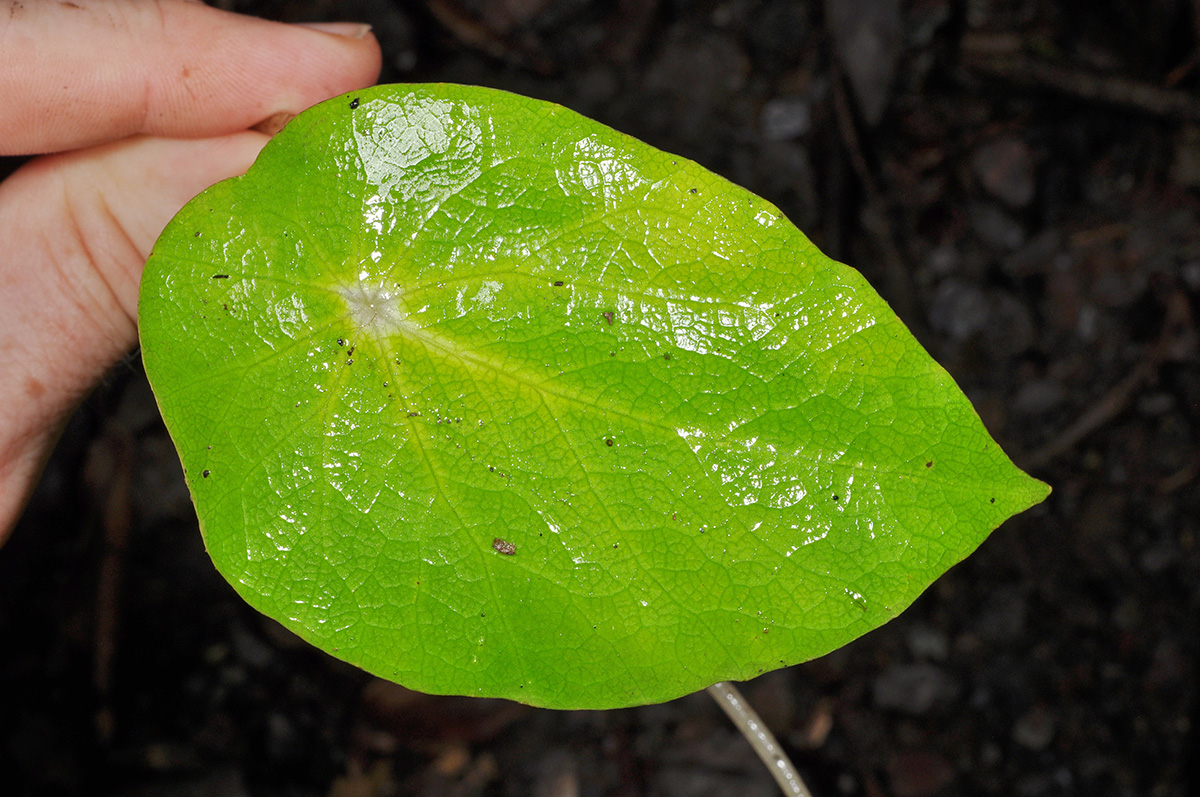
- Begonia adamsensis leaf

Scientific classification
- Kingdom: Plantae
- Clade: Tracheophytes
- Clade: Angiosperms
- Clade: Eudicots
- Clade: Rosids
- Order: Cucurbitales
- Family: Begoniaceae
- Genus: Begonia
- Species: B. adamsensis

Binomial name
- Begonia adamsensis Magtoto & Rubite

= Begonia adamsensis =

Species of flowering plant

Begonia adamsensis is an endemic species of Begonia discovered in Adams, Ilocos Norte province, Luzon, Philippines occurring at an altitude of 308 m above sea level. The species broad-based leaves that are peltate, with a glabrous peduncle, an acuminate tip and nearly entire margin, resembled that of Begonia hernandioides. However, there are differences, in that B. hernandioides had red-colored stipule that is broadly ovate, the petiole and abaxial lamina is pubescent, and the peltate leaves are elliptic.

== Etymology ==
The specific epithet refers to the name of the municipality of Adams, where the species was first documented.
