= Begonia anodifolia =

Scientific classification
- Kingdom: Plantae
- Clade: Tracheophytes
- Clade: Angiosperms
- Clade: Eudicots
- Clade: Rosids
- Order: Cucurbitales
- Family: Begoniaceae
- Genus: Begonia
- Species: B. anodifolia

Binomial name
- Begonia anodifolia A.DC

Species of flowering plant

Begonia anodifolia is a species of plant in the family Begoniaceae and is native to Mexico.
