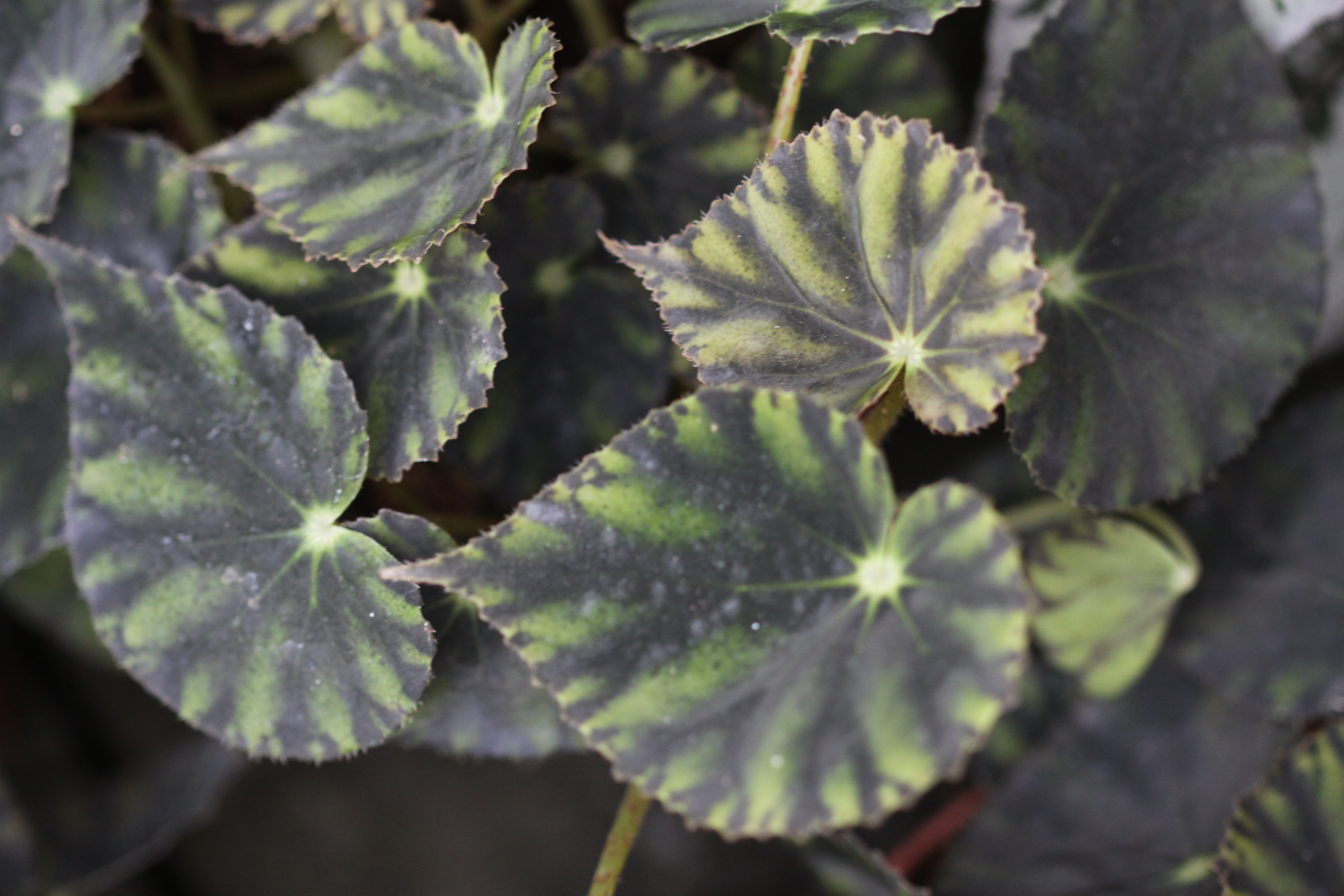
- Leaves

Scientific classification
- Kingdom: Plantae
- Clade: Tracheophytes
- Clade: Angiosperms
- Clade: Eudicots
- Clade: Rosids
- Order: Cucurbitales
- Family: Begoniaceae
- Genus: Begonia
- Species: B. mazae

Binomial name
- Begonia mazae Ziesenh.

Synonyms
- Begonia mazae var. deminuta Ziesenh.; Begonia mazae f. nigricans Ziesenh.; Begonia mazae f. viridis Ziesenh.

= Begonia mazae =

Species of flowering plant

Begonia mazae is a species of flowering plant in the family Begoniaceae, native to southeastern Mexico. In its tropical forest habitat it grows in extremely dense shade.
