= Begonia rubrobracteolata =

Scientific classification
- Kingdom: Plantae
- Clade: Tracheophytes
- Clade: Angiosperms
- Clade: Eudicots
- Clade: Rosids
- Order: Cucurbitales
- Family: Begoniaceae
- Genus: Begonia
- Species: B. rubrobracteolata

Binomial name
- Begonia rubrobracteolata S.Julia & C.Y.Ling

Species of flowering plant

Begonia rubrobracteolata is a species of Begonia was found in the forests of Sarawak, Borneo, where 28 other Begonia species live. The discovery was found in 2016 by S.Julia & C.Y.Ling . The small plant grows on sandstone boulders and do well in shaded areas. This herb, which is critically endangered, was found on one site of forest conversion.
