= Begonia discrepans =

Scientific classification
- Kingdom: Plantae
- Clade: Tracheophytes
- Clade: Angiosperms
- Clade: Eudicots
- Clade: Rosids
- Order: Cucurbitales
- Family: Begoniaceae
- Genus: Begonia
- Species: B. discrepans

Binomial name
- Begonia discrepans Irmsch.

Synonyms
- Begonia tenuicaulis Irmsch.

Species of flowering plant

Begonia discrepans is a species of flowering plant in the family Begoniaceae. It is endemic to Myanmar and China.
