= Begonia longifolia =

Scientific classification
- Kingdom: Plantae
- Clade: Tracheophytes
- Clade: Angiosperms
- Clade: Eudicots
- Clade: Rosids
- Order: Cucurbitales
- Family: Begoniaceae
- Genus: Begonia
- Species: B. longifolia

Binomial name
- Begonia longifolia Blume

Synonyms
- List: Begonia aptera Hayata; Begonia crassirostris Irmsch.; Begonia hayatae Gagnep.; Begonia inflata C.B.Clarke; Begonia tricornis Ridl.; Begonia trisulcata (A.DC.) Warb.; Casparya trisulcata A.DC.; Diploclinium longifolium (Blume) Miq.; Diploclinium longifolium var. luxurians Miq. ex Koord.

Species of plant

Begonia longifolia is a species of flowering plant in the family Begoniaceae. It is native to the eastern Himalayas, southern China, Hainan, Taiwan, mainland Southeast Asia, and some of the islands of Indonesia. An erect perennial herb reaching 1.5 m (5 ft), it is typically found in shady, moist forests at elevations from 200 to 2,200 m (700 to 7,200 ft). It is the most widespread species of Begonia in Asia, and probably in the world.
