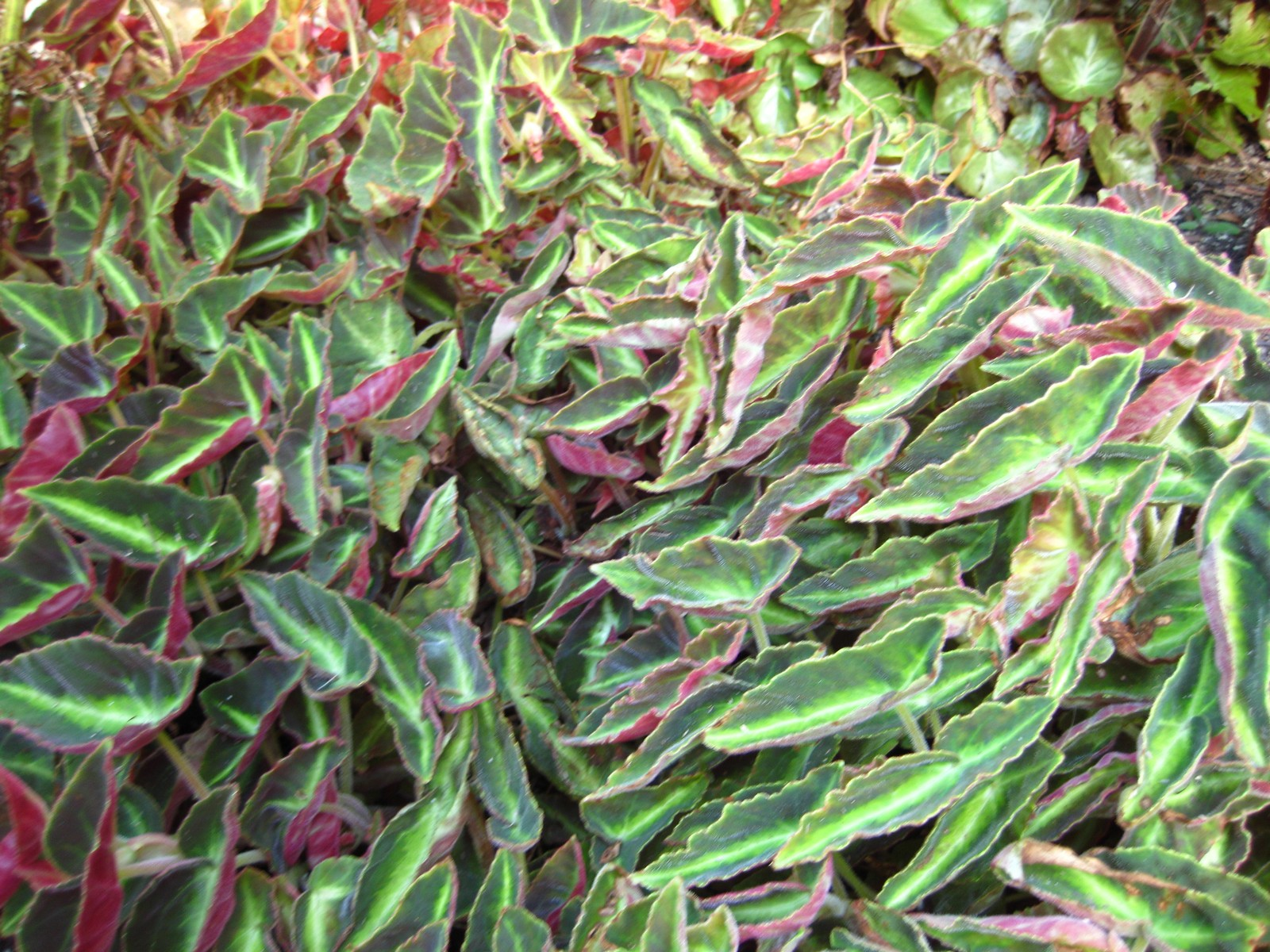
- Begonia listada leaves

Scientific classification
- Kingdom: Plantae
- Clade: Tracheophytes
- Clade: Angiosperms
- Clade: Eudicots
- Clade: Rosids
- Order: Cucurbitales
- Family: Begoniaceae
- Genus: Begonia
- Species: B. listada

Binomial name
- Begonia listada L.B.Sm. & Wassh.

= Begonia listada =

Species of flowering plant

Begonia listada, the striped begonia, is a species of flowering plant in the family Begoniaceae, native to Brazil. It is a compact shrublike evergreen begonia growing to 0.5 metres (20 in), bearing succulent green leaves with a prominent rib of lighter green, and a reddish underside. It produces small pink-tinted white flowers intermittently throughout the year. As it does not tolerate temperatures below 10 °C (50 °F), in temperate regions it must be grown under glass.

This plant has gained the Royal Horticultural Society's Award of Garden Merit.
