= Begonia quinquealata =

Scientific classification
- Kingdom: Plantae
- Clade: Tracheophytes
- Clade: Angiosperms
- Clade: Eudicots
- Clade: Rosids
- Order: Cucurbitales
- Family: Begoniaceae
- Genus: Begonia
- Species: B. quinquealata

Binomial name
- Begonia quinquealata C.I Peng & Rubite & C.W.Lin

Species of flowering plant

Begonia quinquealata, the Five-Wing Begonia, is an endemic species of Begonia discovered in Salakot Falls, Napsan, Puerto Princesa City, in northern Palawan, Philippines. This species, along with B. suborbiculata Merr., are the only two known species in the Philippines with 5-winged capsules. Unlike any other member of Begonia sect. Baryandra, B. quinquealata is very distinctive for being a densely hairy herb with long creeping rhizomes. It differs also from B. suborbiculata in that it has thickly chartaceous, widely ovate leaves that have uniformly green upper leaf surface, densely velutinous, with denticulate leaf margin, outer tepals, and red scabrous ovary and capsules.

== Etymology ==
The specific epithet refers to its 5-winged capsule.
