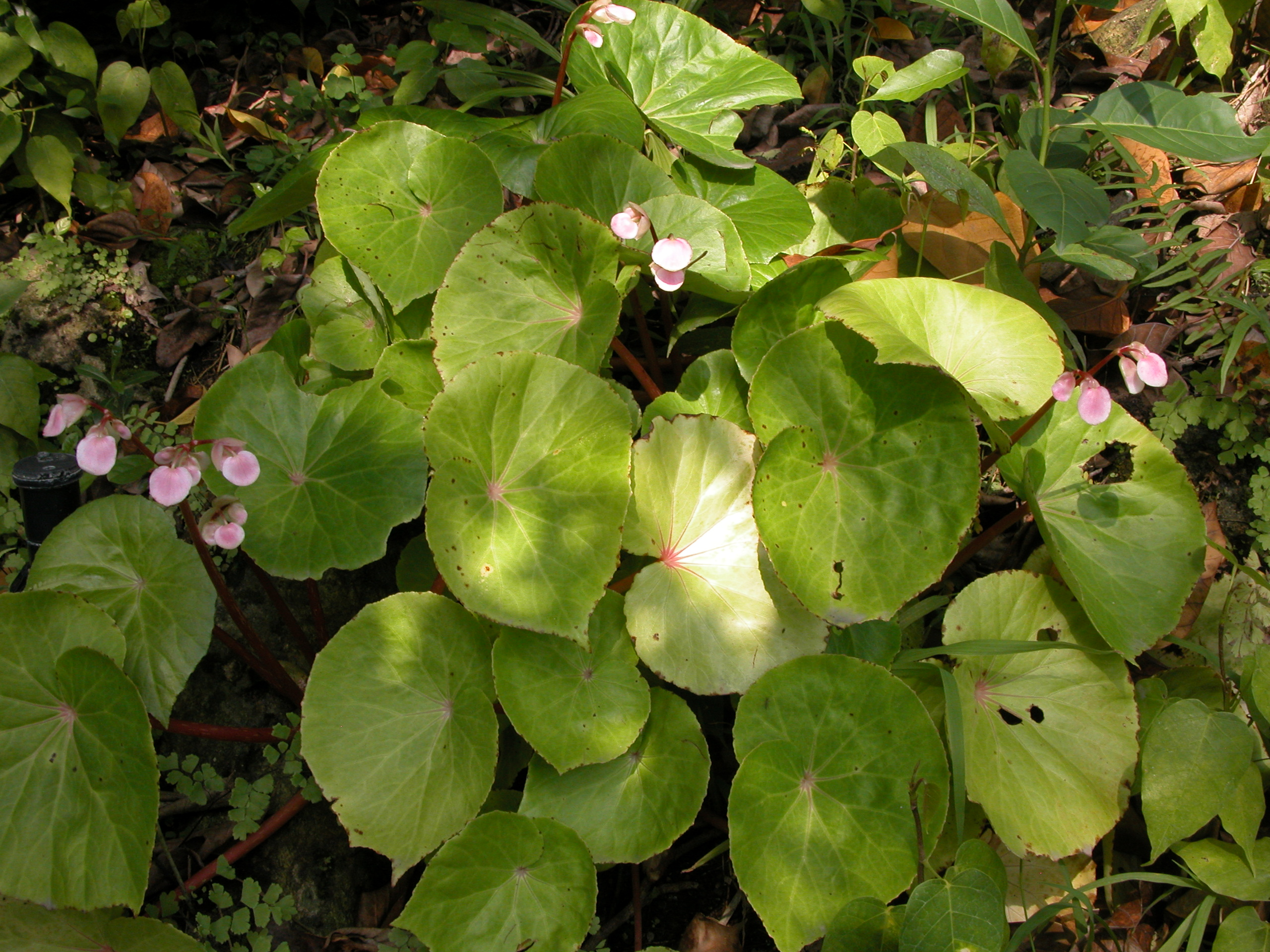

Scientific classification
- Kingdom: Plantae
- Clade: Tracheophytes
- Clade: Angiosperms
- Clade: Eudicots
- Clade: Rosids
- Order: Cucurbitales
- Family: Begoniaceae
- Genus: Begonia
- Species: B. fenicis

Binomial name
- Begonia fenicis Merr.

= Begonia fenicis =

Species of plant

Begonia fenicis is a species of Begonia found in Philippines and Taiwan.
