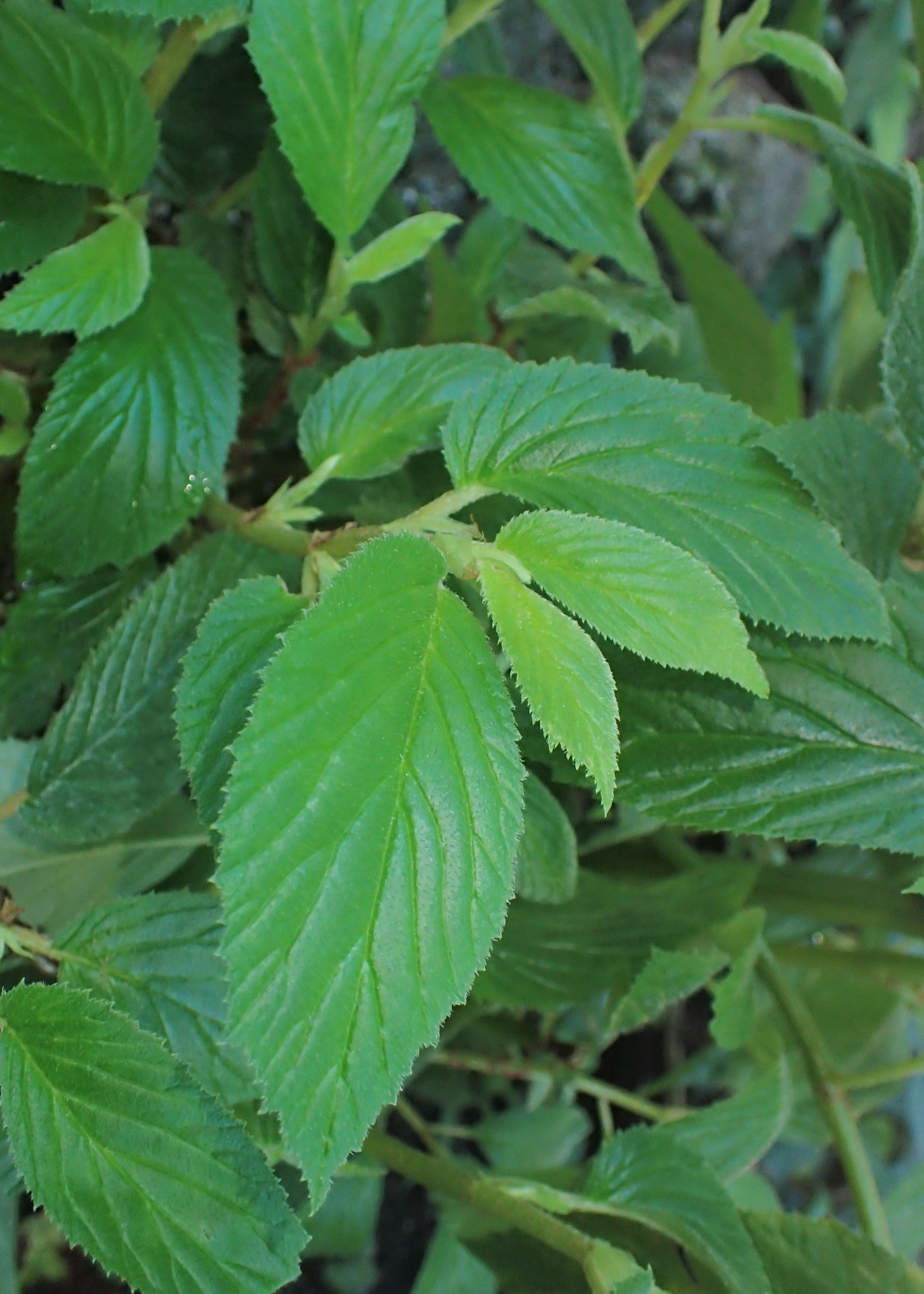
- Leaves

Scientific classification
- Kingdom: Plantae
- Clade: Tracheophytes
- Clade: Angiosperms
- Clade: Eudicots
- Clade: Rosids
- Order: Cucurbitales
- Family: Begoniaceae
- Genus: Begonia
- Species: B. ulmifolia

Binomial name
- Begonia ulmifolia Willd.

Synonyms
- Begonia dasycarpa A.DC.; Begonia jairii Brade; Donaldia ulmifolia (Willd.) Klotzsch

= Begonia ulmifolia =

Species of flowering plant

Begonia ulmifolia, the elm-leaf begonia, is a species of flowering plant in the family Begoniaceae. It is native to South America; Trinidad and Tobago, Venezuela, the Guianas, and eastern Brazil, and introduced to Mauritius, Réunion, and the Seychelles in the Indian Ocean. Cultivated for its ornamental foliage more than its flowers, it is suitable for green roofs in hot and humid areas.
