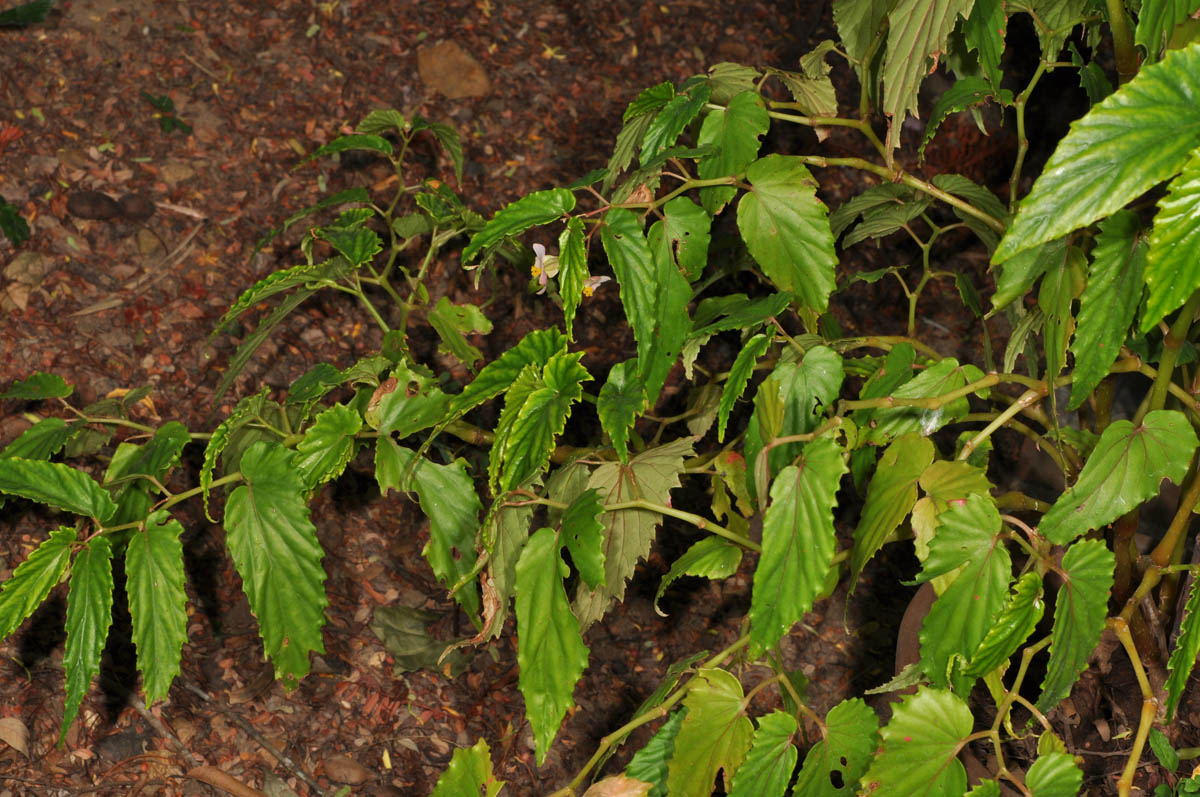
- Cultivated Begonia balangcodiae
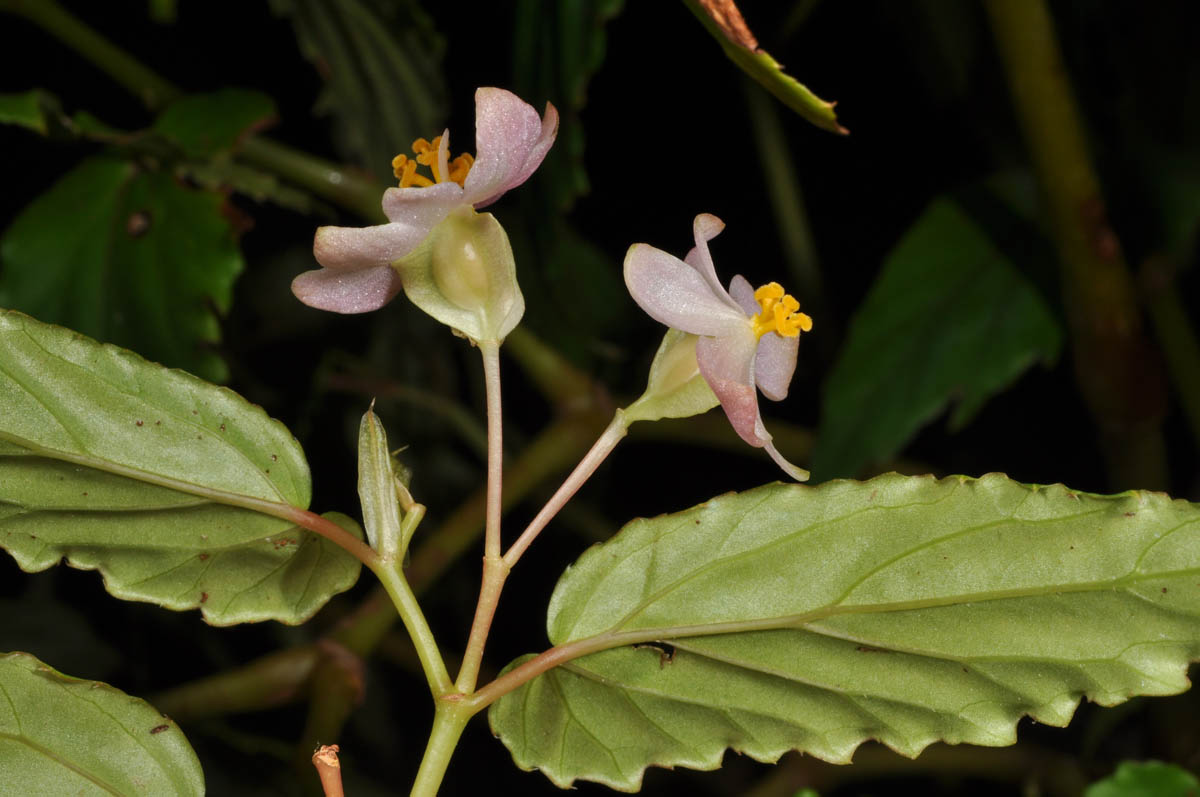
- Cultivated Begonia balangcodiae pistillate flowers

Scientific classification
- Kingdom: Plantae
- Clade: Tracheophytes
- Clade: Angiosperms
- Clade: Eudicots
- Clade: Rosids
- Order: Cucurbitales
- Family: Begoniaceae
- Genus: Begonia
- Species: B. balangcodiae

Binomial name
- Begonia balangcodiae Rubite, S.H.Liu & K.F.Chung

= Begonia balangcodiae =

Species of flowering plant

Begonia balangcodiae is an endemic species of Begonia discovered in Sagubo, Kapangan, Benguet, Philippines. The species was allied to B. esculenta Merr., from which it is distinguished by its cordate leaf base and white tepals, while the latter's leaf base is not cordate and has a vermilion-colored tepals. On the same hand, this species resembles that of B. leucosticta Warburg, differing from the latter on cordate leaf base versus subcordate leaf base, and larger tepals ranging in size from 12 to 18 mm long in pistillate flowers versus the latter's 3–5 mm. Additionally, this species is similar to B. negrosensis Elmer, in that it has lanceolate, glabrous leaf compared to that of latter's obovately oblong and sparsely hairy leaves, and white to greenish tepals, versus that of latter's pinkish tepals.

== Habitat ==
Begonia balangcodiae is found on soil slopes in the mossy forest of Barangay Sagubo, Municipality of Kapangan, Province of Benguet, Luzon, Philippines growing at an elevation of up to 1200 m above sea level.

== Etymology ==
This species was named in honor of Professor Teodora D. Balangcod and her family for their hospitality, and her many research contribution for the flora preservation and ecological conservation in the Cordillera Administrative Region.
