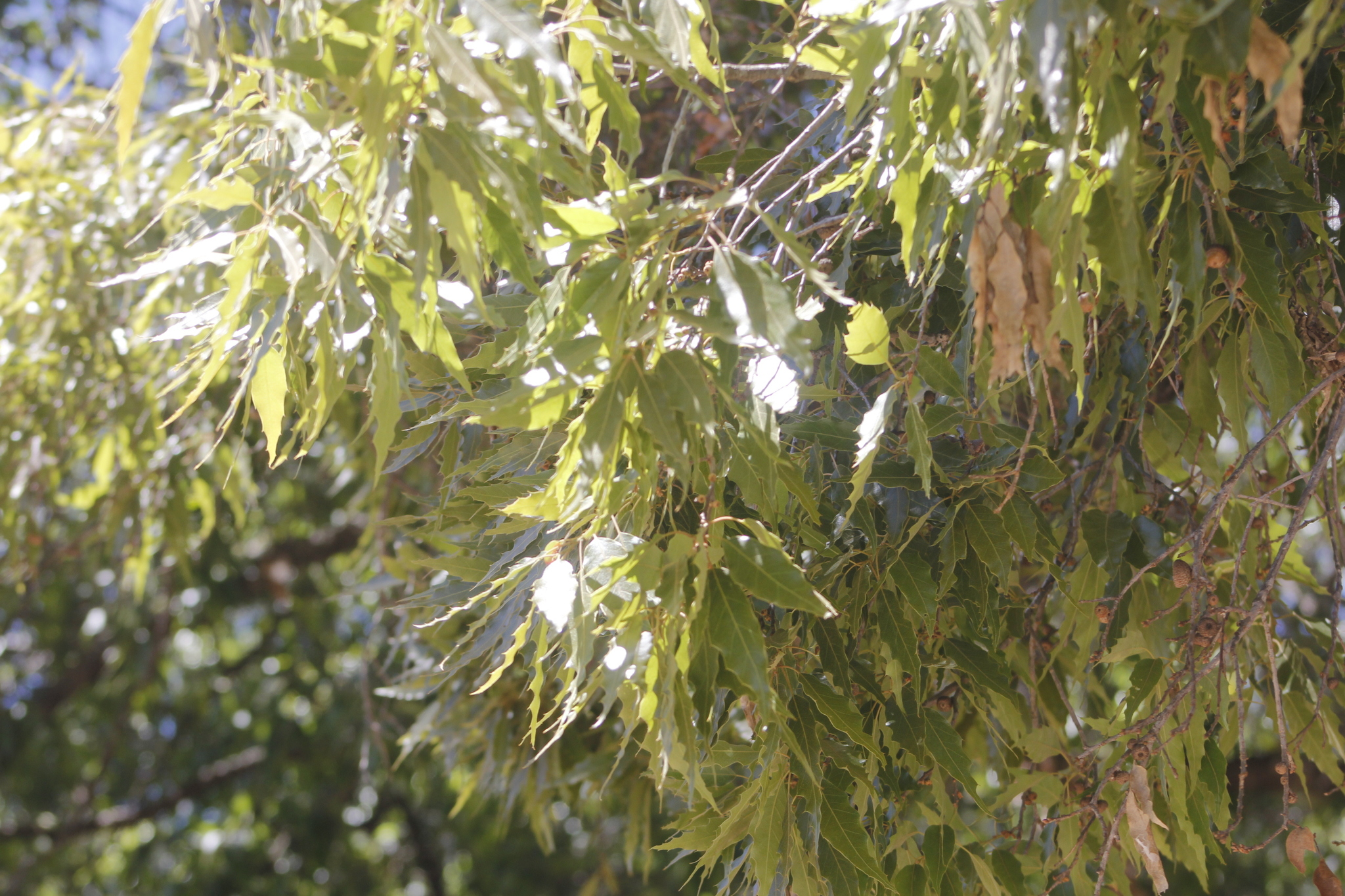

Conservation status
- Data Deficient (IUCN 3.1)

Scientific classification
- Kingdom: Plantae
- Clade: Embryophytes
- Clade: Tracheophytes
- Clade: Spermatophytes
- Clade: Angiosperms
- Clade: Eudicots
- Clade: Rosids
- Order: Fagales
- Family: Fagaceae
- Genus: Quercus
- Subgenus: Quercus subg. Quercus
- Section: Quercus sect. Lobatae
- Species: Q. grahamii

Binomial name
- Quercus grahamii Benth.

= Quercus grahamii =

Species of plant

Quercus grahamii is a species of oak tree in the family Fagaceae, native to central, southwestern and eastern Mexico, in the Sierra Madre del Sur, southern Sierra Madre Oriental, southern Sierra Madre Occidental, and Trans-Mexican Volcanic Belt. It was first described by George Bentham in 1840. It is placed in Quercus section Lobatae.

It grows in montane oak forest, pine–oak forest, and tropical deciduous forest from 1,540 to 2,480 meters elevation, typically on shallow, limestone-derived soils with leaf litter. In oak forest it is associated with Q. crassifolia, Q. castanea, Q. splendens, and Q. calophylla, and in pine-oak forest with Pinus chiapensis, P. michoacana, and Arbutus sp. In tropical deciduous forest it grows with Q. magnoliifolia and Brahea dulcis.
