= Quercus citrifolia =

Scientific classification
- Kingdom: Plantae
- Clade: Embryophytes
- Clade: Tracheophytes
- Clade: Angiosperms
- Clade: Eudicots
- Clade: Rosids
- Order: Fagales
- Family: Fagaceae
- Genus: Quercus
- Subgenus: Quercus subg. Quercus
- Section: Quercus sect. Lobatae
- Species: Q. citrifolia

Binomial name
- Quercus citrifolia Liebm.

Synonyms
- Quercus borucasana Trel.; Quercus granulata Liebm.

Species of flowering plant

Quercus citrifolia îs a species of oak. It is a tree native to Guatemala, Costa Rica, and Panama.

The species was described by Frederik Liebmann in 1854. Some authorities consider it a synonym of Quercus salicifolia or Quercus seemannii
