= Quercus sororia =

Conservation status
- Least Concern (IUCN 3.1)

Scientific classification
- Kingdom: Plantae
- Clade: Embryophytes
- Clade: Tracheophytes
- Clade: Spermatophytes
- Clade: Angiosperms
- Clade: Eudicots
- Clade: Rosids
- Order: Fagales
- Family: Fagaceae
- Genus: Quercus
- Species: Q. sororia

Binomial name
- Quercus sororia Liebm. (1854)

Species of oak

Quercus sororia is a species of oak in the Fagaceae family. It is a tree endemic to Mexico. It grows at elevations between 1,000 and 2,300 metres (3,300 and 7,500 ft). Q. sororia was first described by Frederik Liebmann in 1854.

Valencia-A. and Coombes argue that the species has often been confused with Q. splendens and treated as a synonym. The IUCN Red List lists Q. splendens as a former name, while World Flora Online considers it a synonym along with Q. crassifolia.
