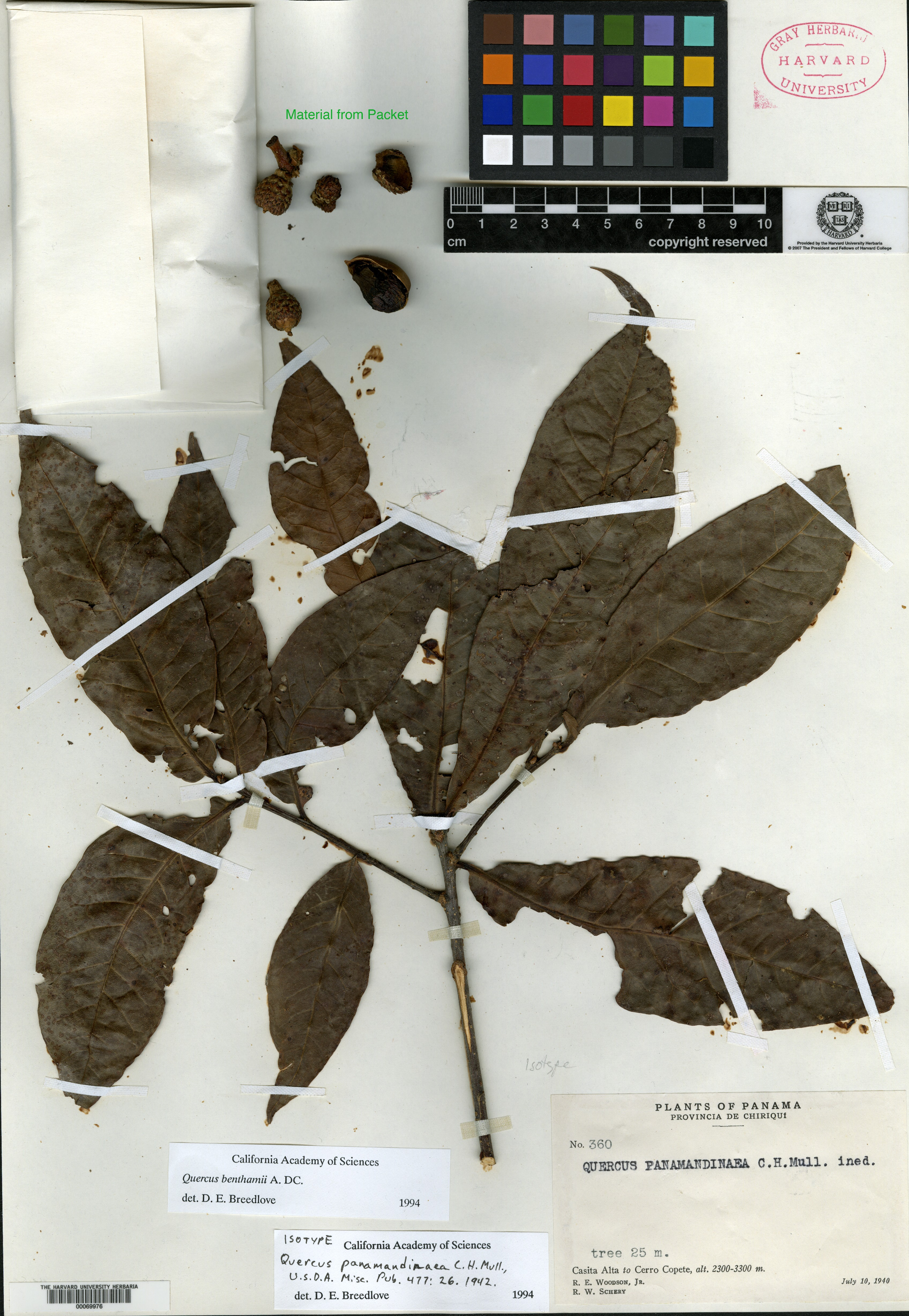

Scientific classification
- Kingdom: Plantae
- Clade: Embryophytes
- Clade: Tracheophytes
- Clade: Spermatophytes
- Clade: Angiosperms
- Clade: Eudicots
- Clade: Rosids
- Order: Fagales
- Family: Fagaceae
- Genus: Quercus
- Subgenus: Quercus subg. Quercus
- Section: Quercus sect. Lobatae
- Species: Q. panamandinaea

Binomial name
- Quercus panamandinaea C.H.Mull.

= Quercus panamandinaea =

Species of oak tree

Quercus panamandinaea is a species of oak tree native to Costa Rica and Panama. It belongs to Quercus sect. Lobatae within Quercus subg. Quercus and is named after its distribution in Panama and the Andean region. It prefers a wet, tropical biome.

== Description ==
Quercus panamandinaea is a tree reaching heights up to 25 metres. It has evergreen leaves that are thin but tough, measuring approximately 10–15 cm in length and 4–6 cm in width. The leaves are broadly lanceolate to oblanceolate in shape, with a long acuminate apex and a cuneate, rounded, or slightly truncate base. The margin of the leaves is typically entire, slightly wavy, rarely toothed, with somewhat of a revolute appearance. Both sides of the leaves are typically glabrous, although a few stellate trichomes may be present at the base of the midrib on the upper surface. The leaves exhibit 12-18 pairs of veins, which are branched and anastomosed near the margin. These veins are impressed on the upper surface and remotely raised underneath. Some obscure intercalary veins may also be present. The petioles of the leaves are approximately 4 mm long, 1.5–3 mm thick, and can be hairless or occasionally have a stellate pubescence. They are typically dark reddish-brown in colour.

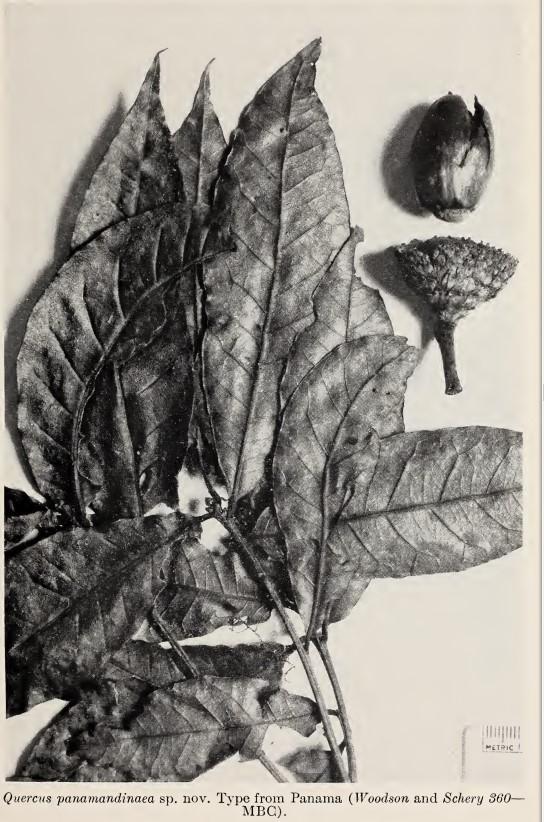
An image from "The Central American species of Quercus" (1942)

During the flowering period, Quercus panamandinaea produces female catkins that are approximately 1.5 cm long. Each catkin bears 2-3 flowers and is attached to a glabrous peduncle. Quercus panamandinaea's fruit are acorns, measuring about 2-2.5 cm in length and 1.5-1.8 cm in width. These acorns are ovoid in shape, hairless, and light brown in colour. They are usually solitary or occur in groups of 2–3, each attached to a 1 cm long peduncle. The cup of the acorn is 2.5 cm in diameter and 1.5 cm high, with ovate to ovate-lanceolate scales that are thickened at the base. The cup scales are densely covered in grey tomentose hairs, except for the reddish-brown apex. The species exhibits inequal cotyledons and matures its acorns within the same year.

The twigs of Quercus panamandinaea are generally 1 mm thick, occasionally reaching 2 mm in thickness. They start off as brown and stellate pubescent but gradually become glabrate. The tree's twigs have inconspicuous light lenticels. The buds are ovoid, subacute, and measure about 2-2.5 mm in length. They are hairless and light straw-coloured. Quercus panamandinaea possesses deciduous stipules.

The species was initially classified by C.H. Muller in 1940 under Quercus series Lancifoliae, despite its distinct characteristics compared to other taxa in the series. Some recent authors consider it a synonym of Quercus seemannii.
