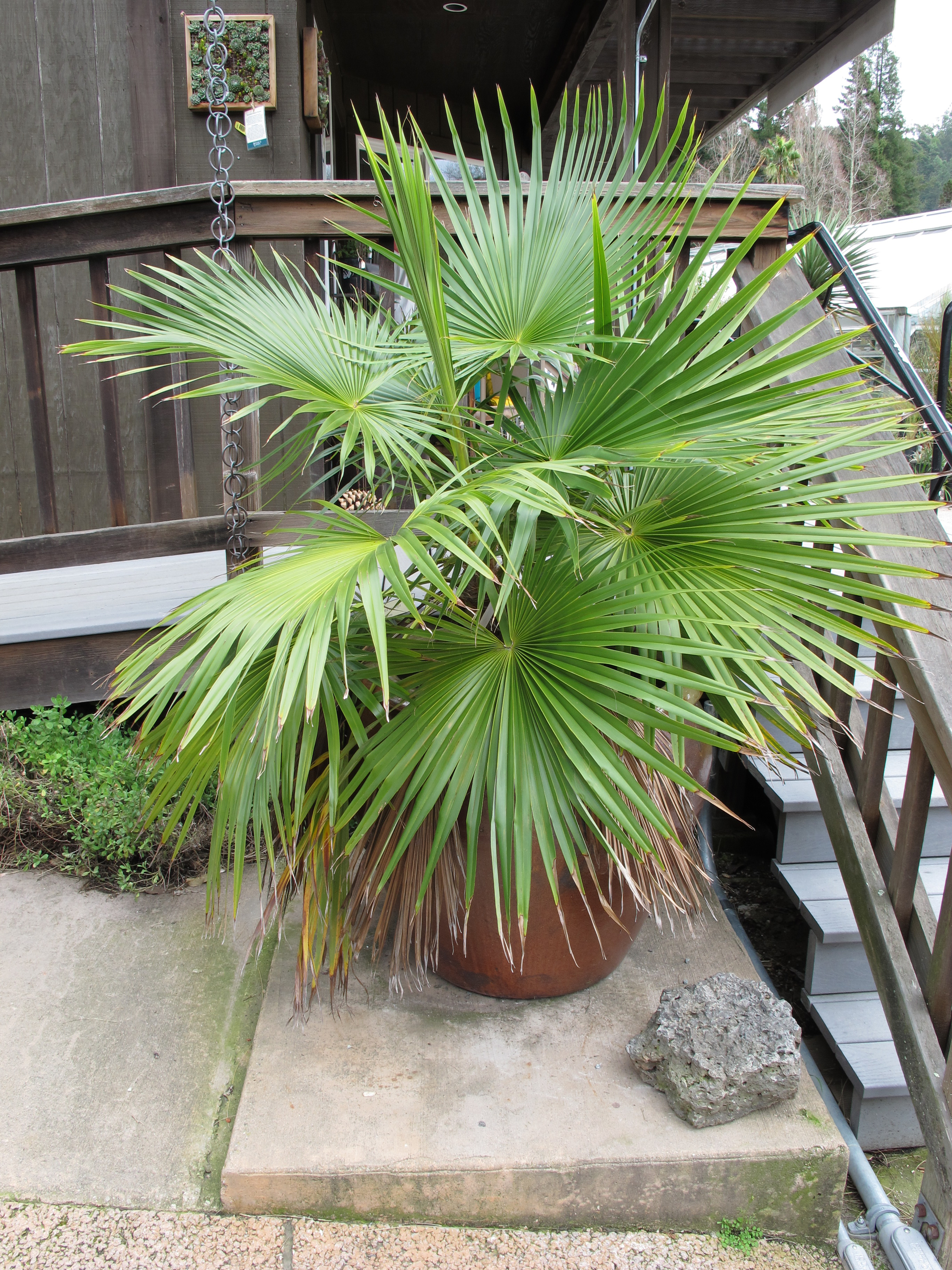

Conservation status
- Least Concern (IUCN 3.1)

Scientific classification
- Kingdom: Plantae
- Clade: Tracheophytes
- Clade: Angiosperms
- Clade: Monocots
- Clade: Commelinids
- Order: Arecales
- Family: Arecaceae
- Tribe: Trachycarpeae
- Genus: Brahea
- Species: B. calcarea

Binomial name
- Brahea calcarea Liebm.

Synonyms
- Brahea nitida André

= Brahea calcarea =

Species of palm

Brahea calcarea is a species of palm. It is found in Guatemala and Mexico and is threatened by habitat loss.
