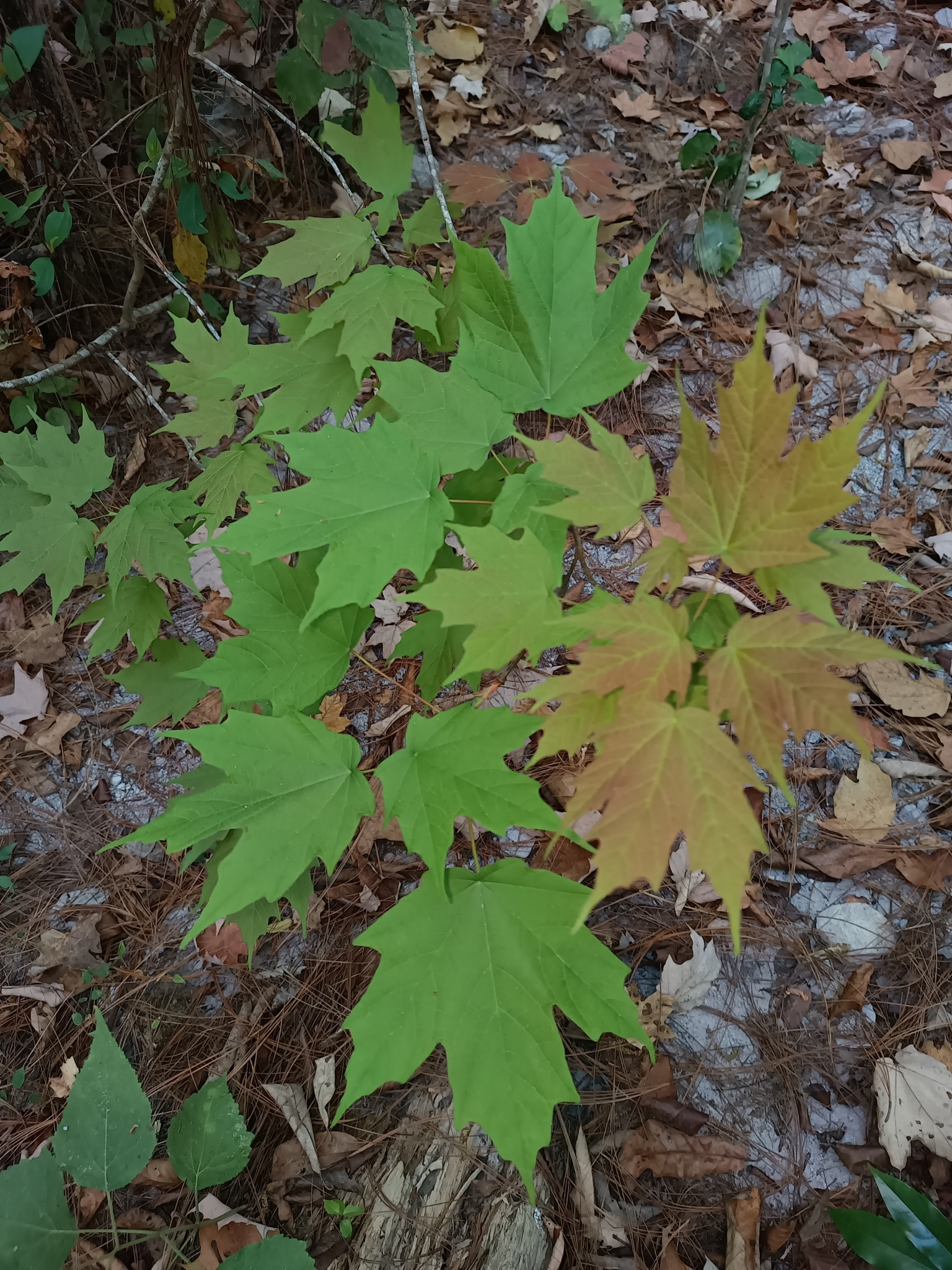

Conservation status
- Critically Endangered (IUCN 3.1)

Scientific classification
- Kingdom: Plantae
- Clade: Tracheophytes
- Clade: Angiosperms
- Clade: Eudicots
- Clade: Rosids
- Order: Sapindales
- Family: Sapindaceae
- Genus: Acer
- Section: Acer sect. Acer
- Series: Acer ser. Saccharodendron
- Species: A. binzayedii

Binomial name
- Acer binzayedii Y.L.Vargas-Rodr.

= Acer binzayedii =

Species of flowering plant

Acer binzayedii, commonly known as algodoncillo, is a species of flowering plant in the genus Acer. It is endemic to Jalisco State in western Mexico. It has a limited range, and is considered Critically Endangered.

== Description ==
Acer binzayedii is a large tree, growing to between 20 and 30 meters (66 and 98 ft) in height. It flowers between December and January and sets fruit from March.

== Taxonomy ==
The formal description of the species reads as follows: "The specific epithet honours a philanthropist committed to the protection of the environment and the preservation of species, His Highness Sheikh Mohammed bin Zayed Al Nahyan, Crown Prince of Abu Dhabi and Deputy Supreme Commander of the United Arab Emirates Armed Forces. Through his philanthropic endowment, the first author was able to conduct phylogeographic and taxonomic studies of Acer in tropical America; this research led to the discovery and recognition of this new species."

Until 2017 it was considered a western population of Acer skutchii.

== Range and habitat ==
Acer binzayedii is native to ravine montane cloud forests in the Sierra de Manantlán of western Jalisco State. It known from two remnant populations, each less than two hectares in area, between 1,790 and 1,880 meters (5,870 and 6,170 ft) elevation. Mean temperature is 18.5 °C (65.3 °F). The two cloud forest remnants are separated by pine–oak forest.

It grows on intermediate rocks and cambisol soil. It is typically found in association with Carpinus tropicalis, Cornus disciflora, Dendropanax arboreus, Ostrya virginiana, and Quercus salicifolia. A. binzayedii is susceptible to fire.

== Conservation ==
Human disturbance is causing species' habitat to decline in area, extent and quality. The species also suffers from low genetic diversity.

The population was formerly larger, but only 90 mature trees have been observed, along with a larger number of young trees.
