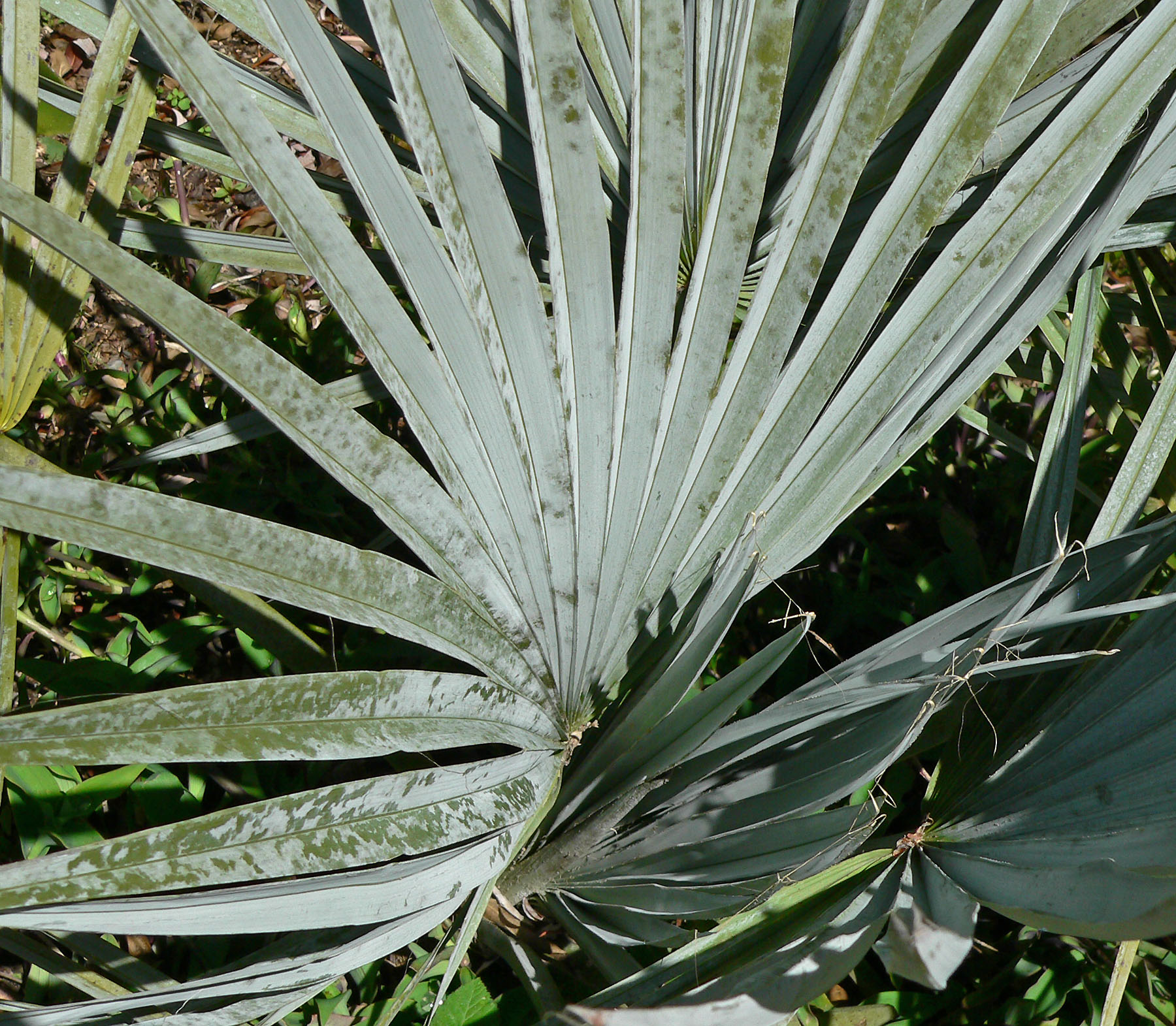
- Brahea decumbens

Scientific classification
- Kingdom: Plantae
- Clade: Embryophytes
- Clade: Tracheophytes
- Clade: Spermatophytes
- Clade: Angiosperms
- Clade: Monocots
- Clade: Commelinids
- Order: Arecales
- Family: Arecaceae
- Subfamily: Coryphoideae
- Tribe: Trachycarpeae
- Genus: Brahea; Mart. ex Endl.

Synonyms
- Erythea S.Watson; Glaucothea O.F.Cook

= Brahea =

Genus of palms

Brahea is a genus of palms in the family Arecaceae. They are commonly referred to as hesper palms and are endemic to Mexico and Central America. All Hesper Palms have large, fan-shaped leaves. The generic name honours Danish astronomer Tycho Brahe (1546-1601).

== Species ==
Image	Name	Common name	Distribution
	Brahea aculeata (Brandegee) H.E.Moore	Sinaloa hesper palm	Sonora, Sinaloa, Durango
	Brahea armata S.Watson	Blue hesper palm, Mexican blue palm	Baja California, Sonora
	Brahea brandegeei (Purpus) H.E.Moore	San Jose hesper palm, palma de taco	Baja California Sur, Sonora
	Brahea calcarea Liebm.		western Mexico, Guatemala
	Brahea decumbens Rzed.		Tamaulipas, San Luis Potosí
	Brahea dulcis (Kunth) Mart.	Rock palm	widespread across much of Mexico as well as Belize, Guatemala, Honduras, El Salvador
	Brahea edulis H.Wendl.	Guadalupe palm	Guadalupe Island in State of Baja California
	Brahea moorei L.H.Bailey ex H.E.Moore		Hidalgo, Querétaro, San Luis Potosí, Tamaulipas
	Brahea pimo Becc.		Nayarit, Jalisco, Guerrero, México State, Michoacán
	Brahea salvadorensis H.Wendl. ex Becc.		El Salvador, Honduras, Nicaragua
	Brahea sarukhanii H.J.Quero		Nayarit, Jalisco

=== Formerly placed here ===
- Washingtonia filifera (Linden ex André) H.Wendl. (as B. filamentosa (H.Wendl. ex Franceschi) H.Wendl. ex Kuntze)
