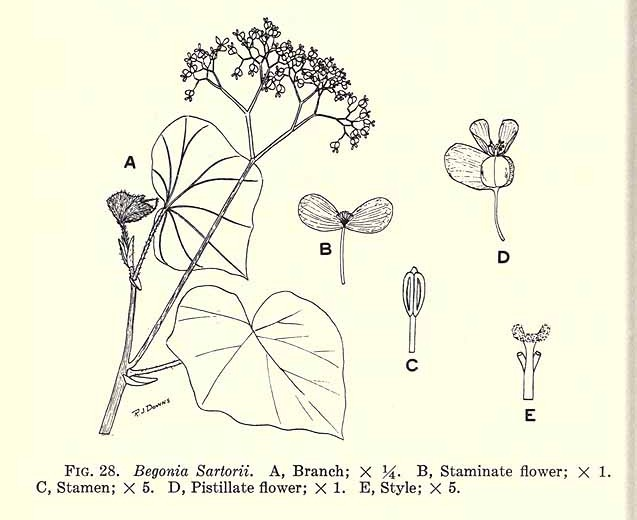

Scientific classification
- Kingdom: Plantae
- Clade: Tracheophytes
- Clade: Angiosperms
- Clade: Eudicots
- Clade: Rosids
- Order: Cucurbitales
- Family: Begoniaceae
- Genus: Begonia
- Species: B. sartorii

Binomial name
- Begonia sartorii Liebm.

Synonyms
- List: Begonia cobana C.DC.; Begonia lobulata (Klotzsch) A.DC.; Begonia sarcophylla Liebm.; Gireoudia lobulata Klotzsch; Gireoudia sarcophylla (Liebm.) Klotzsch

= Begonia sartorii =

Species of flowering plant

Begonia sartorii is a species of flowering plant in the family Begoniaceae, native to Guatemala and Mexico.
