= Quercus candicans =

Quercus candicans is a confused scientific name:

- Quercus candicans Née is a synonym of Roldana candicans (Née) Villaseñor, S.Valencia & Coombes – the type material had been confused
- Plants attributed to Quercus candicans in the past, particularly forms described by Trelease, belong to Quercus calophylla.
