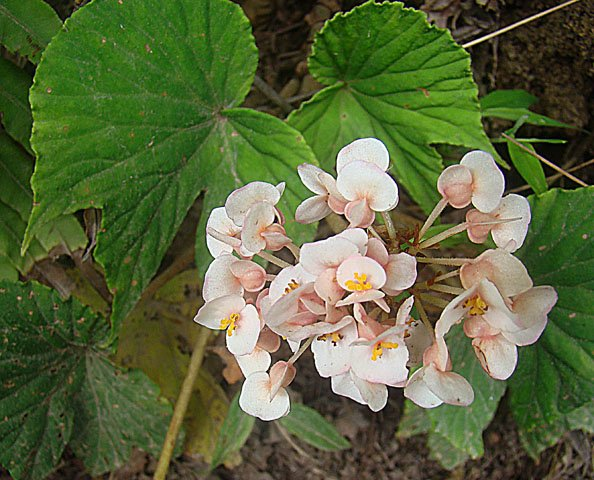

Scientific classification
- Kingdom: Plantae
- Clade: Tracheophytes
- Clade: Angiosperms
- Clade: Eudicots
- Clade: Rosids
- Order: Cucurbitales
- Family: Begoniaceae
- Genus: Begonia
- Species: B. involucrata

Binomial name
- Begonia involucrata Liebm.

Synonyms
- Gireoudia involucrata (Liebm.) Klotzsch; Begonia laciniosa A.DC..; Begonia metachroa Fotsch; Gireoudia laciniata Klotzsch

= Begonia involucrata =

Species of flowering plant

Begonia involucrata is a species of flowering plant in the family Begoniaceae, native to Costa Rica, Guatemala, Honduras, Nicaragua, and Panama.
