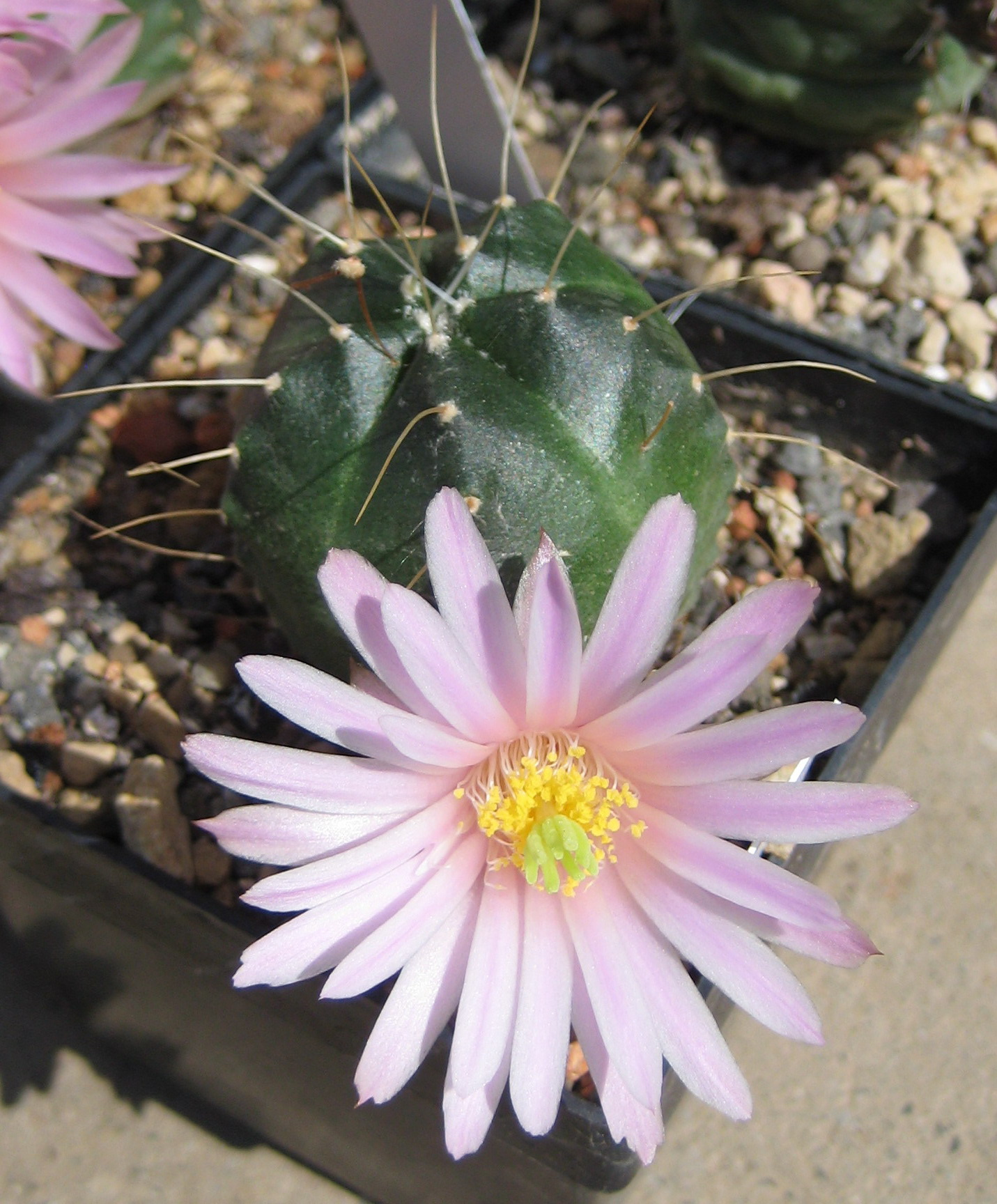

Conservation status
- Least Concern (IUCN 3.1)

Scientific classification
- Kingdom: Plantae
- Clade: Tracheophytes
- Clade: Angiosperms
- Clade: Eudicots
- Order: Caryophyllales
- Family: Cactaceae
- Subfamily: Cactoideae
- Genus: Echinocereus
- Species: E. knippelianus

Binomial name
- Echinocereus knippelianus Liebm., 1895

Synonyms
- Cereus knippelianus (Liebner) Orcutt 1902

= Echinocereus knippelianus =

Species of cactus

Echinocereus knippelianus is a species of hedgehog cactus native to Mexico. It can be grown in cultivation.

== Description ==
Echinocereus knippelianus grows solitary or in sprouts, often forming groups of up to 50 shoots that are rarely extended beyond the soil surface. The almost spherical to spherical, green to fairly blackish green, soft-fleshed shoots reach a diameter of 3 to 8 cm (1.2 to 3.1 in). There are five to seven low and wide ribs. The up to four straight or twisted, light yellow thorns, which can also be missing, are very variable in size. They are 1.5 to 6 cm (0.59 to 2.36 in) long.

The short, funnel-shaped flowers are pink to slightly purple to white and appear near the tips or sides of the shoots. They are 2.5 to 4 cm (0.98 to 1.57 in) long and reach a diameter of 4 to 6.5 cm (1.6 to 2.6 in). The spherical, purple-colored, vertically tearing fruits are covered with one or more thorns and some wool.

== Distribution ==
Echinocereus knippelianus is common in the Mexican states of Coahuila and Nuevo León in open, grasslands and pine forest at high altitudes of 2000 to 2200 meters.

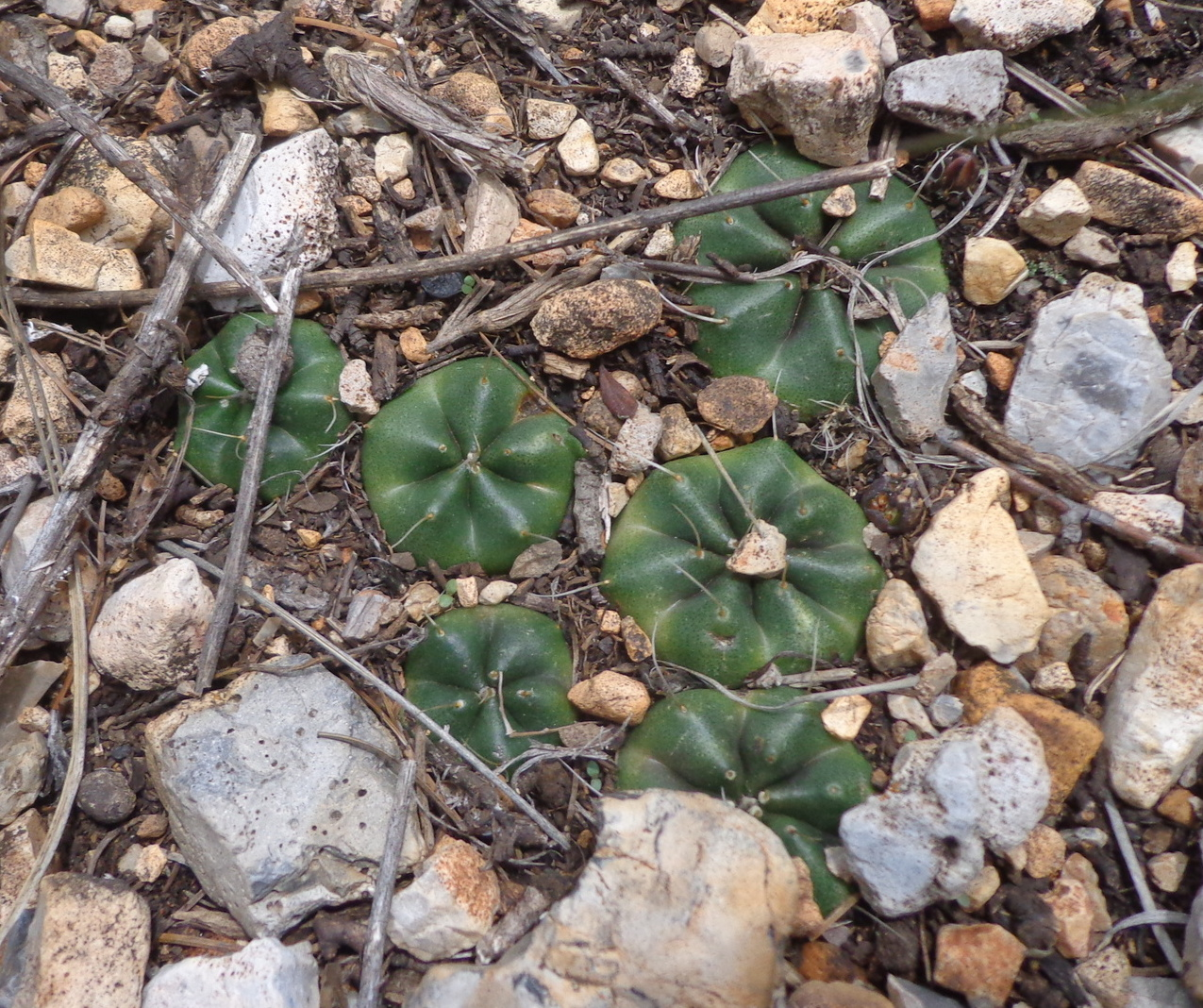
Habitat in Lagunillas, Nuevo Leon, Mexico

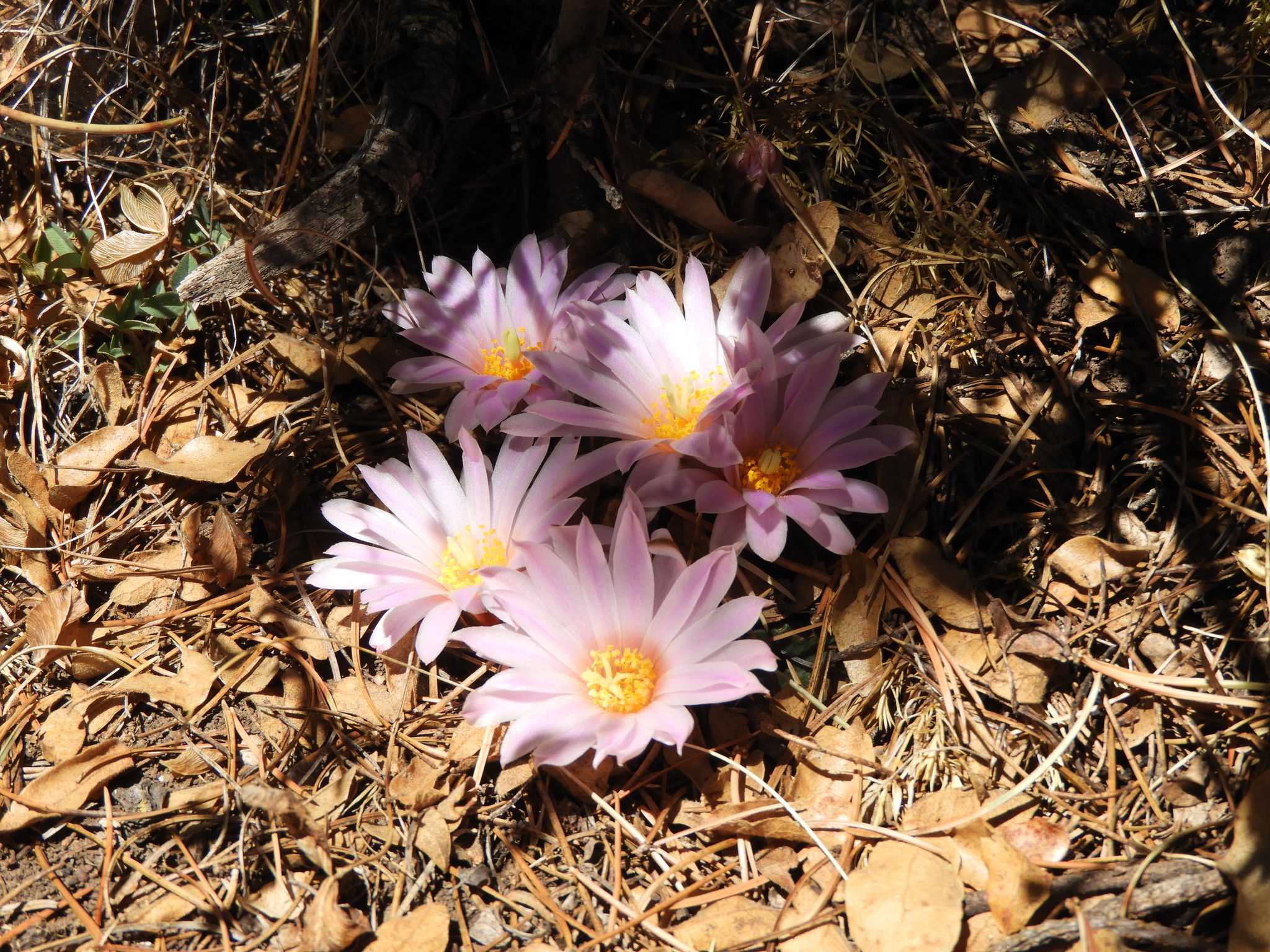
Plant blooming in Cuauhtémoc, Coahuila, Mexico

== Taxonomy ==
The first description was made in 1895 by C. Liebner. The specific epithet knippelianus honors the German cactus breeder Carl Knippel, who was based in Halberstadt. A nomenclature synonym is Cereus knippelianus (Liebner) Orcutt (1902).
