= Brahea pimo =

Conservation status
- Vulnerable (IUCN 2.3)

Scientific classification
- Kingdom: Plantae
- Clade: Tracheophytes
- Clade: Angiosperms
- Clade: Monocots
- Clade: Commelinids
- Order: Arecales
- Family: Arecaceae
- Tribe: Trachycarpeae
- Genus: Brahea
- Species: B. pimo

Binomial name
- Brahea pimo Becc.

Species of palm

Brahea pimo is a species of flowering plant in the family Arecaceae. It is found only in Mexico. It is threatened by habitat loss.
