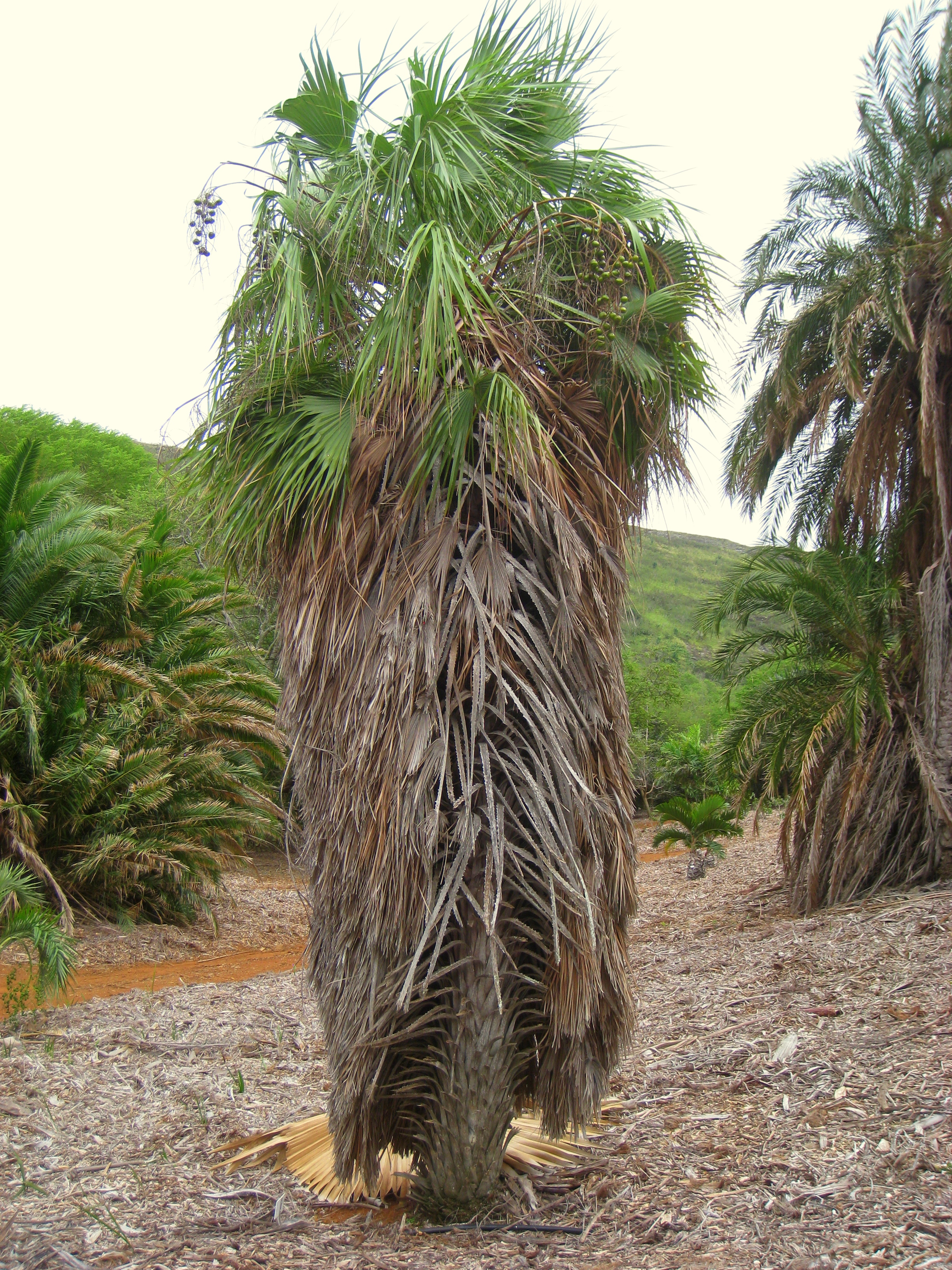

Conservation status
- Vulnerable (IUCN 2.3)

Scientific classification
- Kingdom: Plantae
- Clade: Tracheophytes
- Clade: Angiosperms
- Clade: Monocots
- Clade: Commelinids
- Order: Arecales
- Family: Arecaceae
- Tribe: Trachycarpeae
- Genus: Brahea
- Species: B. aculeata

Binomial name
- Brahea aculeata (T.S. Brandegee) H.E. Moore

= Brahea aculeata =

Species of palm

Brahea aculeata is a species of flowering plant in the family Arecaceae. This palm tree is endemic to northwestern Mexico, where it is native to Durango, Sinaloa, and Sonora states. It is a vulnerable species, threatened by habitat loss.
