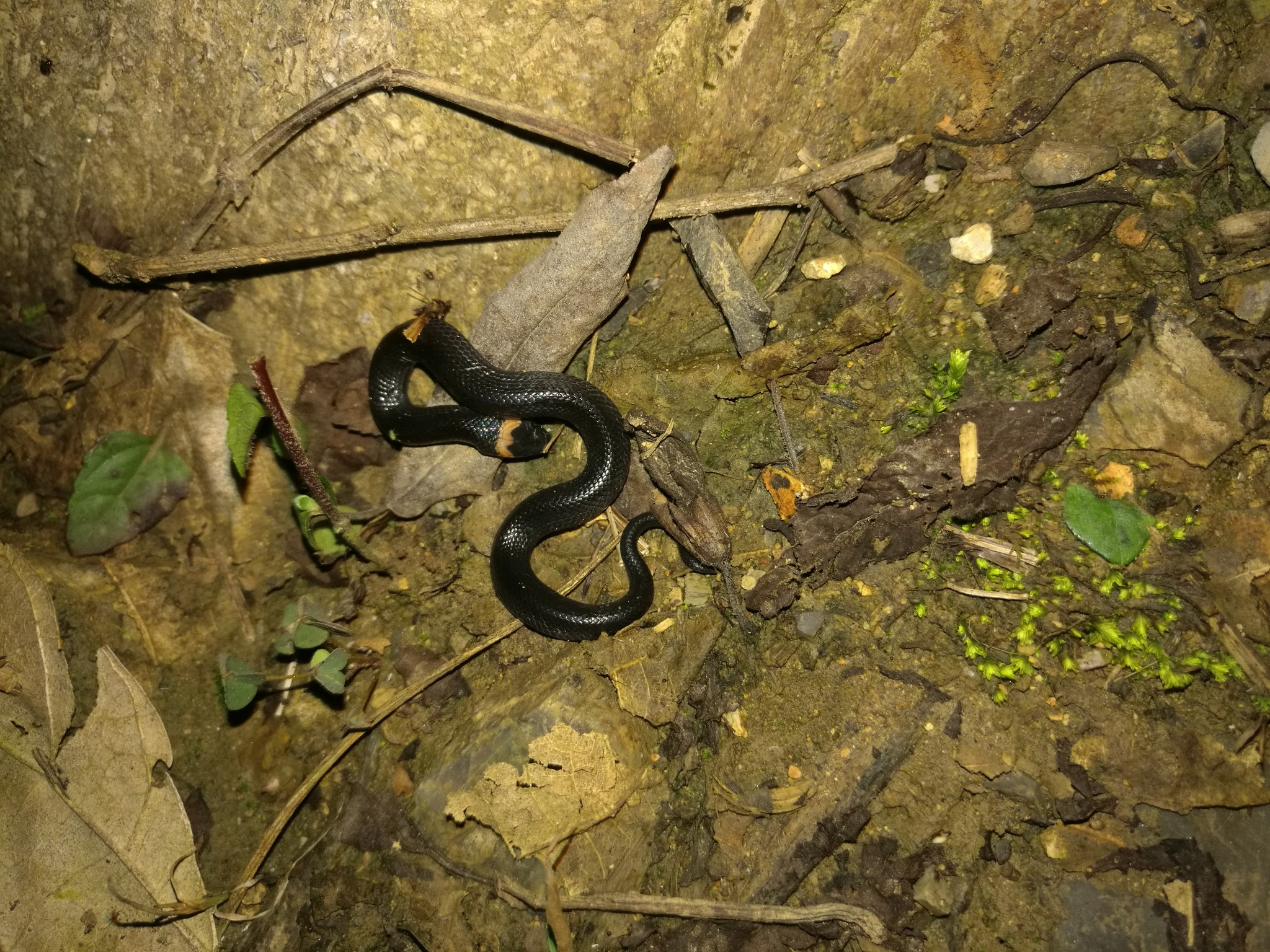

Conservation status
- Least Concern (IUCN 3.1)

Scientific classification
- Kingdom: Animalia
- Phylum: Chordata
- Class: Reptilia
- Order: Squamata
- Suborder: Serpentes
- Family: Colubridae
- Genus: Chersodromus
- Species: C. liebmanni

Binomial name
- Chersodromus liebmanni Reinhardt, 1861
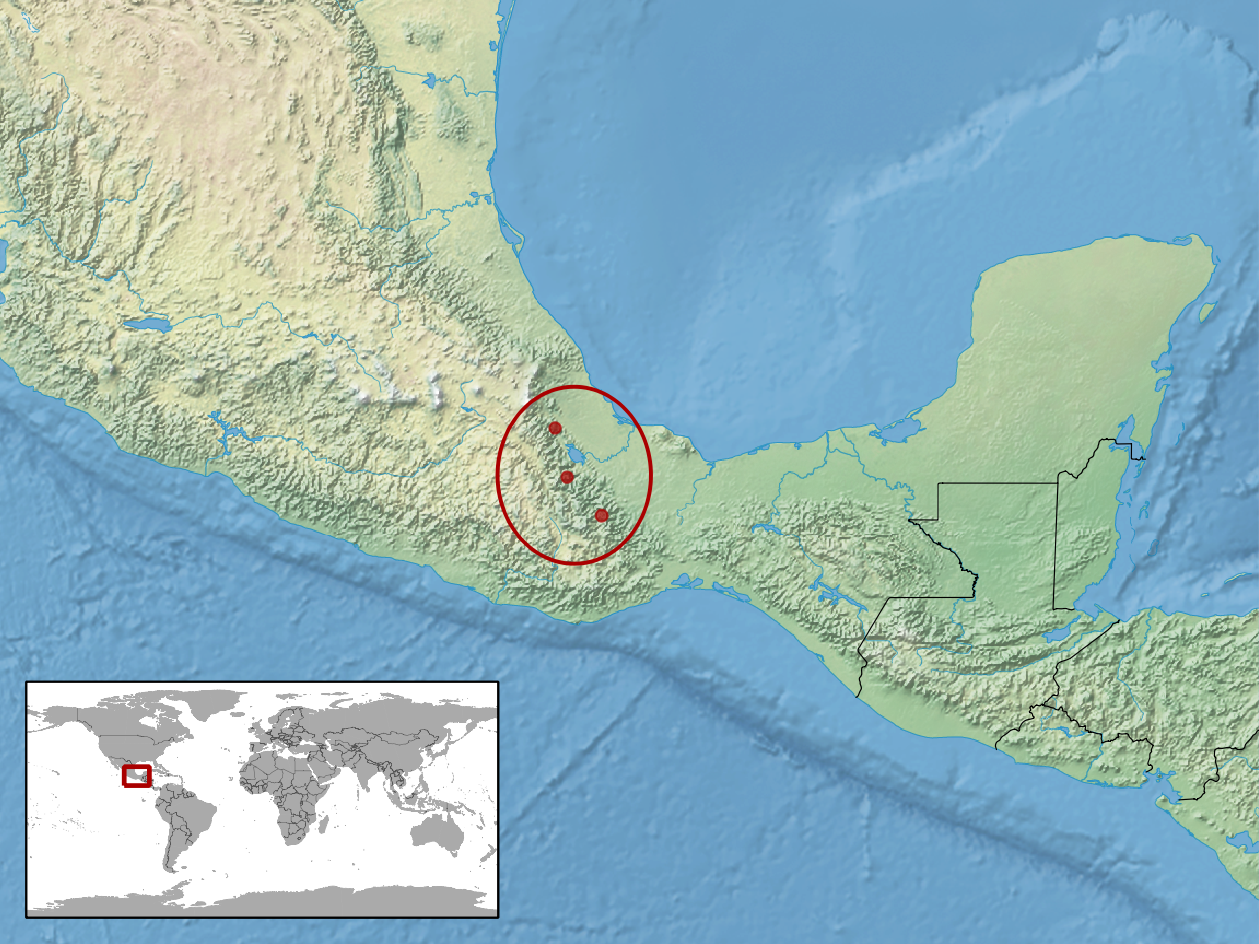

Synonyms
- Ninia liebmanni (Reinhardt, 1861); Chersodromus nigricans Reinhardt, 1861; Opisthiodon torquatus W. Peters, 1861; Dirosema collare F. Werner, 1900

= Chersodromus liebmanni =

Species of snake

Chersodromus liebmanni, also known commonly as Liebmann's earth runner and la corredora de Liebmann in Mexican Spanish, is a species of snake in the subfamily Dipsadinae of the family Colubridae. The species is endemic to Mexico.

== Etymology ==
The specific name, liebmanni, is in honor of Danish botanist Frederik Michael Liebmann.

== Description ==
Like all species in its genus, C. liebmanni has a single fused prefrontal shield instead of the usual pair of prefrontal scales.

== Geographic range ==
C. liebmanni is found in the Mexican states of Oaxaca and Veracruz.

== Habitat ==
The preferred natural habitat of C. liebmanni is forest.

== Behavior ==
C. liebmanni is terrestrial and shelters under rocks and fallen logs.

== Reproduction ==
C. liebmanni is oviparous.
