= Chersodromus rubriventris =

Conservation status
- Endangered (IUCN 3.1)

Scientific classification
- Kingdom: Animalia
- Phylum: Chordata
- Class: Reptilia
- Order: Squamata
- Suborder: Serpentes
- Family: Colubridae
- Genus: Chersodromus
- Species: C. rubriventris

Binomial name
- Chersodromus rubriventris (Taylor, 1949)
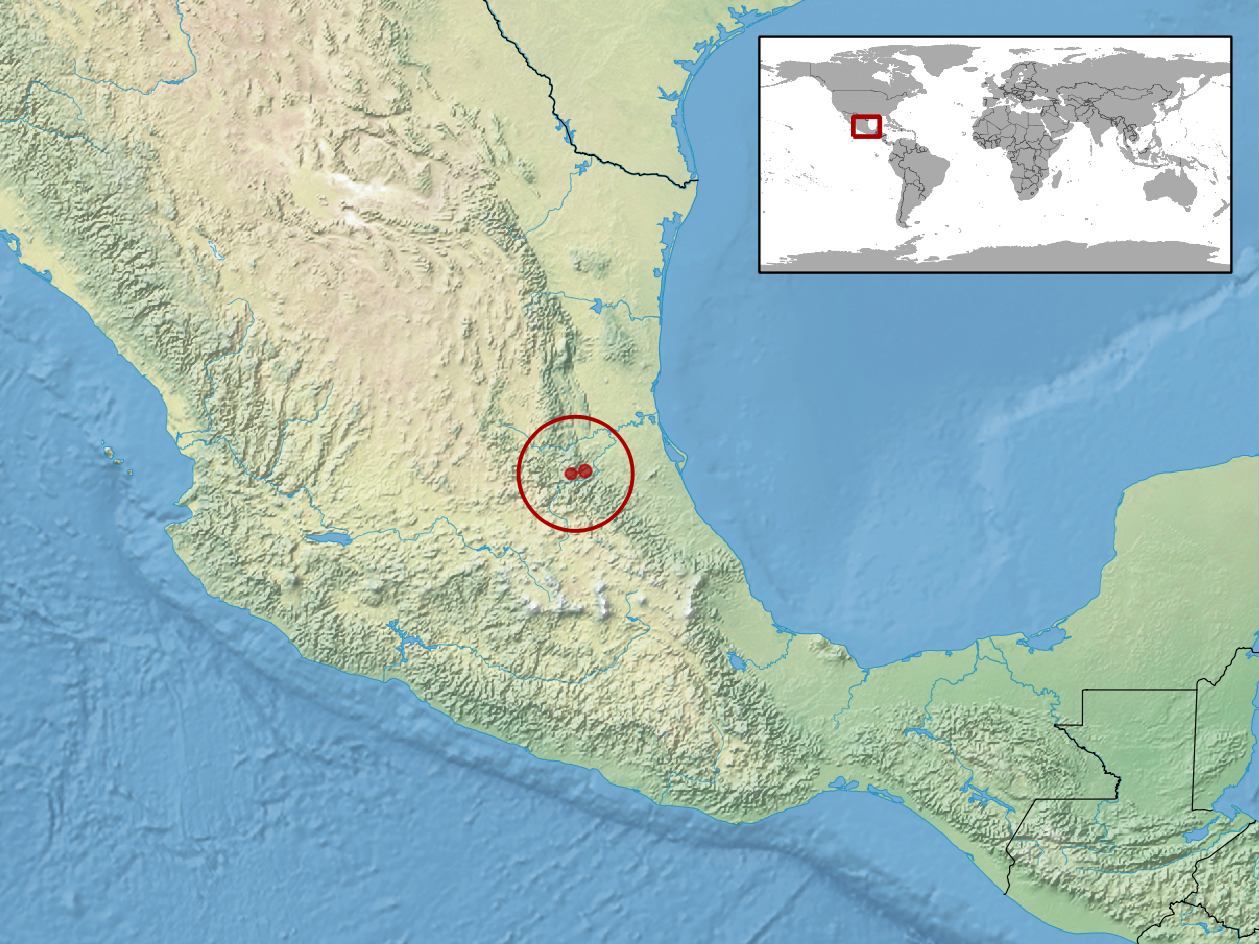

Species of snake

Chersodromus rubriventris, the redbelly earth runner, is a species of snake in the family Colubridae. The species is endemic to Mexico.
