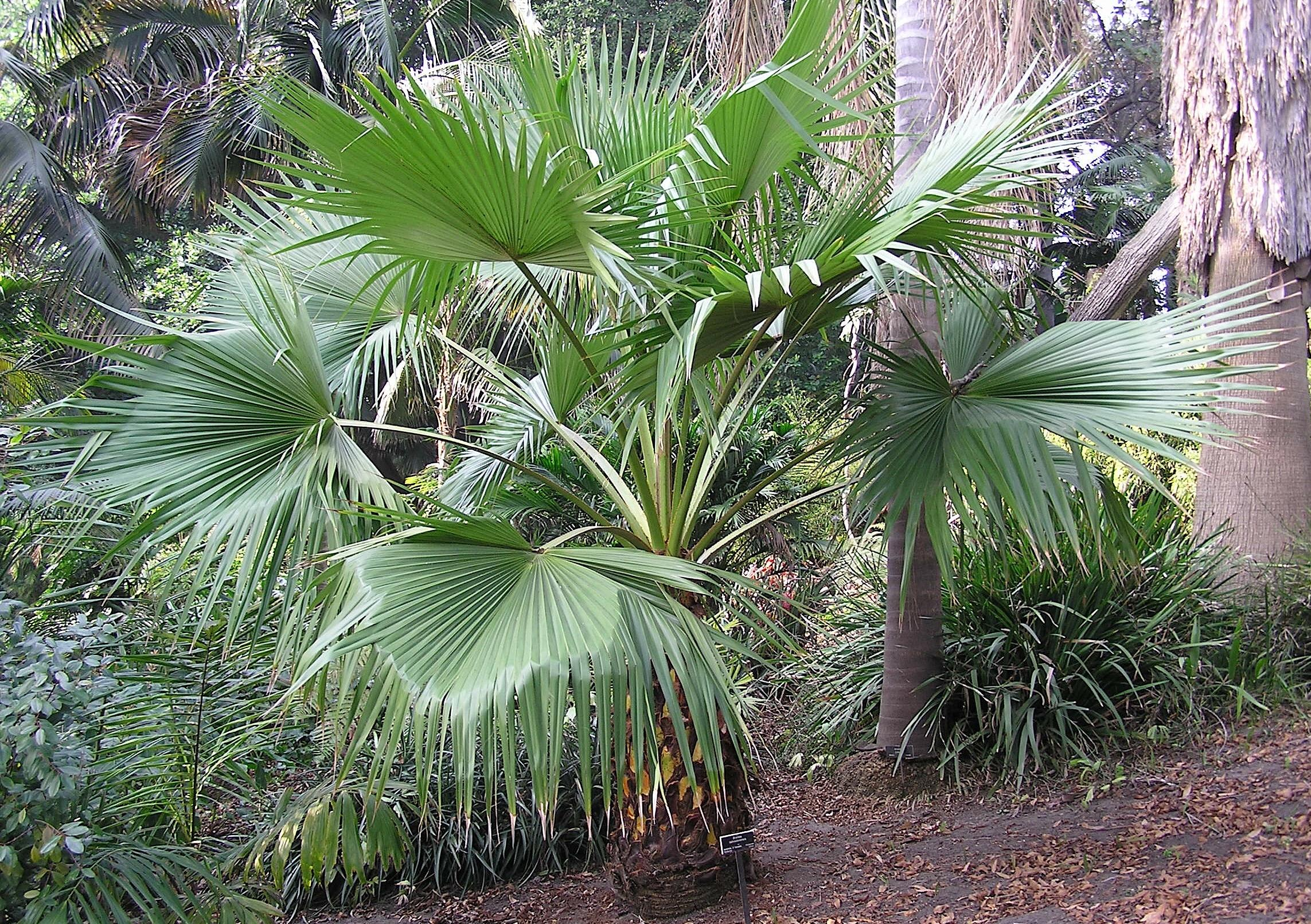

Conservation status
- Critically Endangered (IUCN 3.1)

Scientific classification
- Kingdom: Plantae
- Clade: Embryophytes
- Clade: Tracheophytes
- Clade: Spermatophytes
- Clade: Angiosperms
- Clade: Monocots
- Clade: Commelinids
- Order: Arecales
- Family: Arecaceae
- Tribe: Trachycarpeae
- Genus: Brahea
- Species: B. salvadorensis

Binomial name
- Brahea salvadorensis H.Wendl. ex Becc.

Synonyms
- Acoelorraphe cookii Bartlett; Acoelorraphe salvadorensis (H.Wendl. ex Becc.) Bartlett; Erythea cookii (Bartlett) H.E.Moore; Erythea salvadorensis (H.Wendl. ex Becc.) H.E.Moore

= Brahea salvadorensis =

Species of plant

Brahea salvadorensis is a species of flowering plant in the family Arecaceae.

== Description ==
The palms are erect, solitary, hardy, of medium size, and are frequently found in small colonies. They have a columnar trunk growing up to 6 m in height or are frequently acaulescent; the trunk may be covered with the remains of the caducous palm stems. The plant is dioecious. Leaves have a nearly orbicular lamina, slightly costapalmate, with 70 bifid segments. Segments are 85 cm long by 1–2 cm wide; the underside is initially lepidote-tomentose with caducous, peltate-fimbriate scales; principal veins are initially floccose-furfuraceous. Stems are inermous, glabrous, reddish, with soft fibers, divided in a web of fibers; the petiole is elongated, slightly adaxially convex, irregularly abaxially convex, initially furfuraceous-lanate-lepidote, protected by marginal, acute, and incurved teeth, extending towards the base of the lamina; ligule is thickly membranous in the adaxial face.

Inflorescences are 100–150 cm long, interfoliar, equal to or exceeding the leaves, erect or arched, thin, immediately divided in a series of hanging, branched units; bracts are tubular, amounting about 7, rigid, red, opening obliquely in the apex, stemming the peduncle and at the base of the primary branches; primary branches are 70 cm long. The rachilla are 8–18 cm long, blank-tomentose, glabrescent when fruiting; flowers are 5–6 mm long, in glomerules of (1–) 2–3 over bracteolated, slightly elevated pluvini. Sepals are loose, glabrous in the margins, scarcely pubescent in the inferior half, without scarious margins. Petals are loose, valved, reflexed in anthesis, glabrous or with a tuft of trichomes at the base, dorsally subtomentose or glabrous. Flowers have 6 stamens.

Fruits are subglobose, blackish, have subapical stigmatic remains, the exocarp is smooth when ripe, pubescent when unripe, the mesocarp is carnose, the endocarp thin, frequently adhered to the seed. The seed is globose or subglobose, endosperm homogenous with deep intrusions, with a lateral embryo and simple eophyll.

== Taxonomy ==
Brahea salvadorensis was initially described by Hermann Wendland, ex Beccari, and published in Webbia 2: 105–106. 1907.

Etymology

Brahea: generic name honoring Danish astronomer, Tycho Brahe (1546–1601).

salvadorensis: geographic name alluding to its localization in El Salvador.

Synonyms

- Acoelorrhaphe salvadorensis (H.Wendl. ex Becc.) Bartlett, Publ. Carnegie Inst. Wash. 461: 32 (1935).
- Erythea salvadorensis (H.Wendl. ex Becc.) H.E.Moore, Gentes Herb. 8: 217 (1951).
- Acoelorrhaphe cookii Bartlett, Publ. Carnegie Inst. Wash. 461: 32 (1935).

== Distribution and habitat ==
B. salvadorensis is a rare species, found in the dry, rocky slopes, and sometimes in pine and oak forests, at an elevation of 800 to 1600 meters of the north-central zone of El Salvador and in Nicaragua. Flowering occurs in August.
