= Chersodromus =

Scientific classification
- Kingdom: Animalia
- Phylum: Chordata
- Class: Reptilia
- Order: Squamata
- Suborder: Serpentes
- Family: Colubridae
- Subfamily: Dipsadinae
- Genus: Chersodromus; Reinhardt, 1861

Genus of snakes

Chersodromus is a genus of snakes in the family Colubridae. The genus is endemic to Mexico.

== Species ==
The genus Chersodromus contains four species which are recognized as being valid.

- Chersodromus australis Canseco-Márquez, Ramírez-González & Campbell, 2018
- Chersodromus liebmanni Reinhardt, 1861 – Liebmann's earth runner
- Chersodromus nigrum Canseco-Márquez, Ramírez-González & Campbell, 2018
- Chersodromus rubriventris (Taylor, 1949) – redbelly earth runner

Nota bene: A binomial authority in parentheses indicates that the species was originally described in a genus other than Chersodromus.
