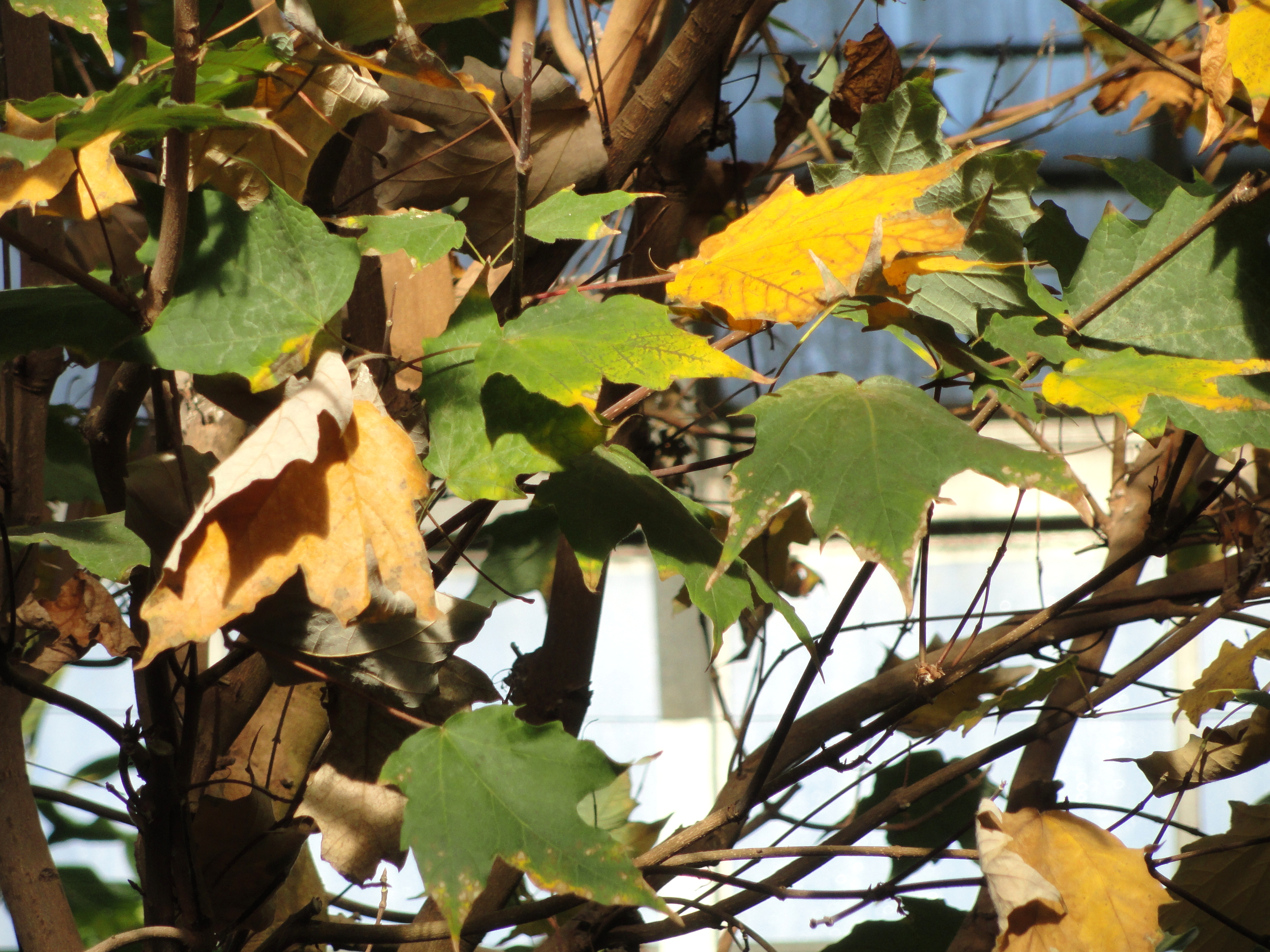

Conservation status
- Critically Endangered (IUCN 3.1)

Scientific classification
- Kingdom: Plantae
- Clade: Embryophytes
- Clade: Tracheophytes
- Clade: Spermatophytes
- Clade: Angiosperms
- Clade: Eudicots
- Clade: Rosids
- Order: Sapindales
- Family: Sapindaceae
- Genus: Acer
- Section: Acer sect. Acer
- Series: Acer ser. Saccharodendron
- Species: A. skutchii

Binomial name
- Acer skutchii Rehder

Synonyms
- Acer saccharum subsp. skutchii (Rehder) A.E.Murray

= Acer skutchii =

Species of flowering plant

Acer skutchii, called the cloud forest sugar maple, Guatemalan maple, Mexican sugar maple, Skutch maple, or álamo plateado is a species of flowering plant in the genus Acer, native to Mexico and Guatemala.

== Taxonomy ==
In 2017, populations growing in the Mexican state of Jalisco were split off as a new species, Acer binzayedii.

It is considered by some authorities to be a subspecies of the sugar maple, as Acer saccharum subsp. skutchii.

== Range and habitat ==
Occurring in sheltered ravines on mountain slopes, it is found only in a few widely separated relict populations within cloud forests in Mexico and Guatemala, between 1480 and 2200 meters elevation. Populations are found in Chiapas, El Cielo Biosphere Reserve in Tamaulipas, and Sierra de las Minas in Guatemala.
