= Chersodromus nigrum =

Scientific classification
- Kingdom: Animalia
- Phylum: Chordata
- Class: Reptilia
- Order: Squamata
- Suborder: Serpentes
- Family: Colubridae
- Genus: Chersodromus
- Species: C. nigrum

Binomial name
- Chersodromus nigrum Canseco-Márquez, Ramírez-González & Campbell, 2018

Species of snake

Chersodromus nigrum is a species of snake in the family Colubridae. The species is endemic to Mexico.
