= Brahea armata =

- Brahea armata growing near Cataviña, Baja California, Mexico

Scientific classification
- Kingdom: Plantae
- Clade: Tracheophytes
- Clade: Angiosperms
- Clade: Monocots
- Clade: Commelinids
- Order: Arecales
- Family: Arecaceae
- Genus: Brahea
- Species: B. armata

Binomial name
- Brahea armata S.Watson

Synonyms
- Brahea armata var. microcarpa Becc.; Brahea clara (L.H.Bailey) Espejo & López-Ferr.; Brahea elegans (Franceschi ex Becc.) H.E.Moore; Brahea glauca Hook.f.; Brahea lucida Hook.f.; Brahea nobilis Hook.f.; Brahea roezlii Linden; Erythea armata (S.Watson) S.Watson; Erythea armata var. microcarpa Becc.; Erythea clara L.H.Bailey; Erythea elegans Franceschi ex Becc.; Erythea roezlii (Linden) Becc. ex Martelli; Glaucothea armata (S.Watson) O.F.Cook; Glaucothea elegans (Franceschi ex Becc.) I.M.Johnst.

Species of palm

Brahea armata, commonly known as the blue fan palm, blue hesper palm, or Mexican blue palm, is a flowering plant in the family Arecaceae, native to Baja California, Mexico. It typically grows 35–50 feet (11–15 m) tall and 1.5–2 feet (0.45–0.6 m) wide, with a stout trunk, and rigid silver-blue palmate fronds. As a member of subgenus Erythea, it is distinguished by distinctly armed petioles with recurved teeth.

It is endemic to the Sonoran Desert, forming stands around perennial water sources, rocky arroyos, and canyon slopes in the north west Mexico. These stands provide critical habitat for wildlife and were historically utilized by regional Indigenous populations for thatch, fiber, and food. Today the blue hesper palm is widely cultivated as an ornamental tree in arid and Mediterranean climates, valued for its extreme drought tolerance and massive, arching inflorescences.

In Baja California, the species forms striking desert oases along the peninsular ranges of the Sierra de Juárez and Sierra de San Pedro Mártir. Key protected populations occur in remote granite fields such as Cataviña, Cañón de Guadalupe, and Santa María within the Valle de los Cirios protected area.

== Description ==
The blue fan palm grows to a height of 15 metres (49 ft), with a stout trunk. Its distinctly bluish leaves are 1–2 metres (3 ft 3 in – 6 ft 7 in) wide, with 1-metre (3 ft 3 in) long petioles. The leaves are persistent in nature, forming a shag around the trunk; in cultivation they are typically burned or cut off. The inflorescences extend out beyond the crown, reaching 5 metres (16 ft) in length. The flowers themselves are small, appearing in February and March, while the fruits are 18–24 millimetres (0.71–0.94 in) in length, brown and with a generally ovoid to globose shape.

== Distribution and habitat ==
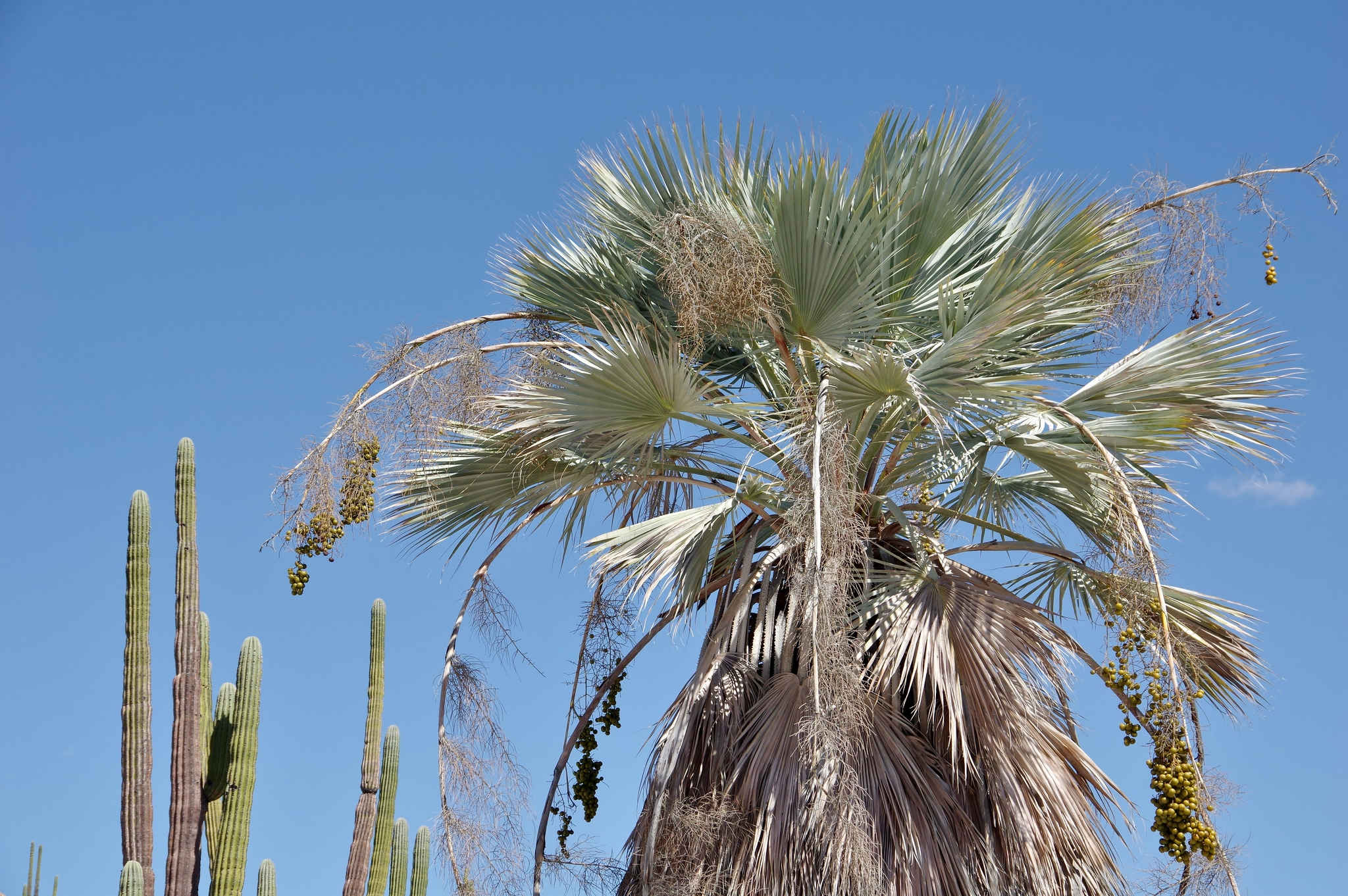
In habitat, Baja California, Mexico

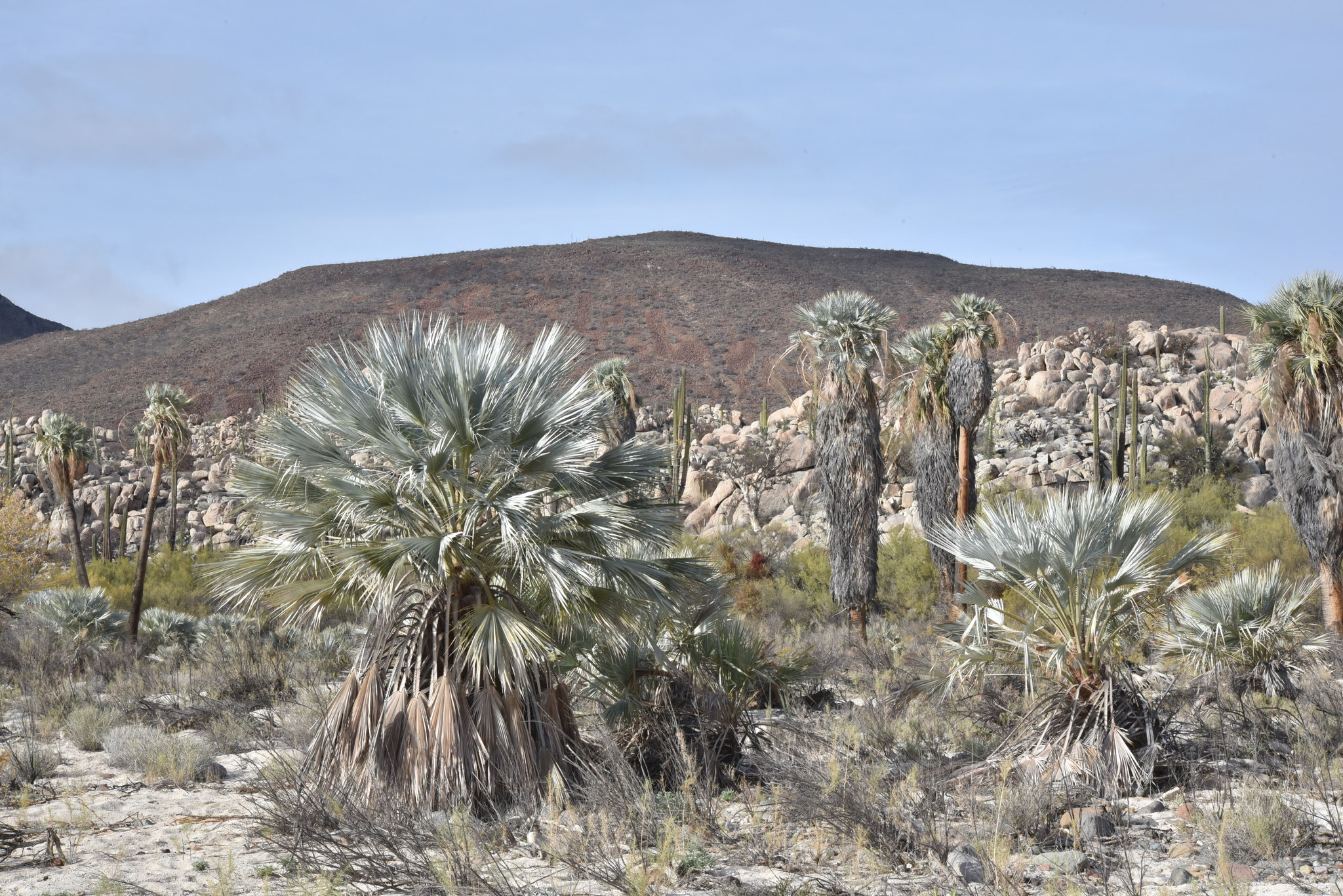
Plants growing in habitat

This species is endemic to the Mexican state of Baja California, distributed from just 8 miles south of the international border near the Jacumba Mountains, to the central desert and Isla Angel de la Guarda. Plants growing in the Sierra de San Francisco in Baja California Sur may be of a different species. It is locally common in arroyos and canyon bottoms, and has been observed growing in rock crevices at higher elevations. It is sometimes found with Washingtonia filifera var. filifera or Washingtonia filifera var. robusta.

== Uses ==
Brahea armata has an attractive appearance, especially when young, and is commonly available at nurseries in the American southwest and in warm temperate locations elsewhere. In the UK it has gained the Royal Horticultural Society's Award of Garden Merit. It is drought tolerant (although occasional deep irrigation is recommended), can handle both partial shade and full sun, and temperatures down to −10 °C (14 °F). It is found under a variety of names, including "Mexican blue palm", "blue hesper palm", "big blue hesper palm", "blue fan palm", "sweet brahea", and "palma blanca".

The Cocopah people ate the seeds after roasting them.

Cultivated plants

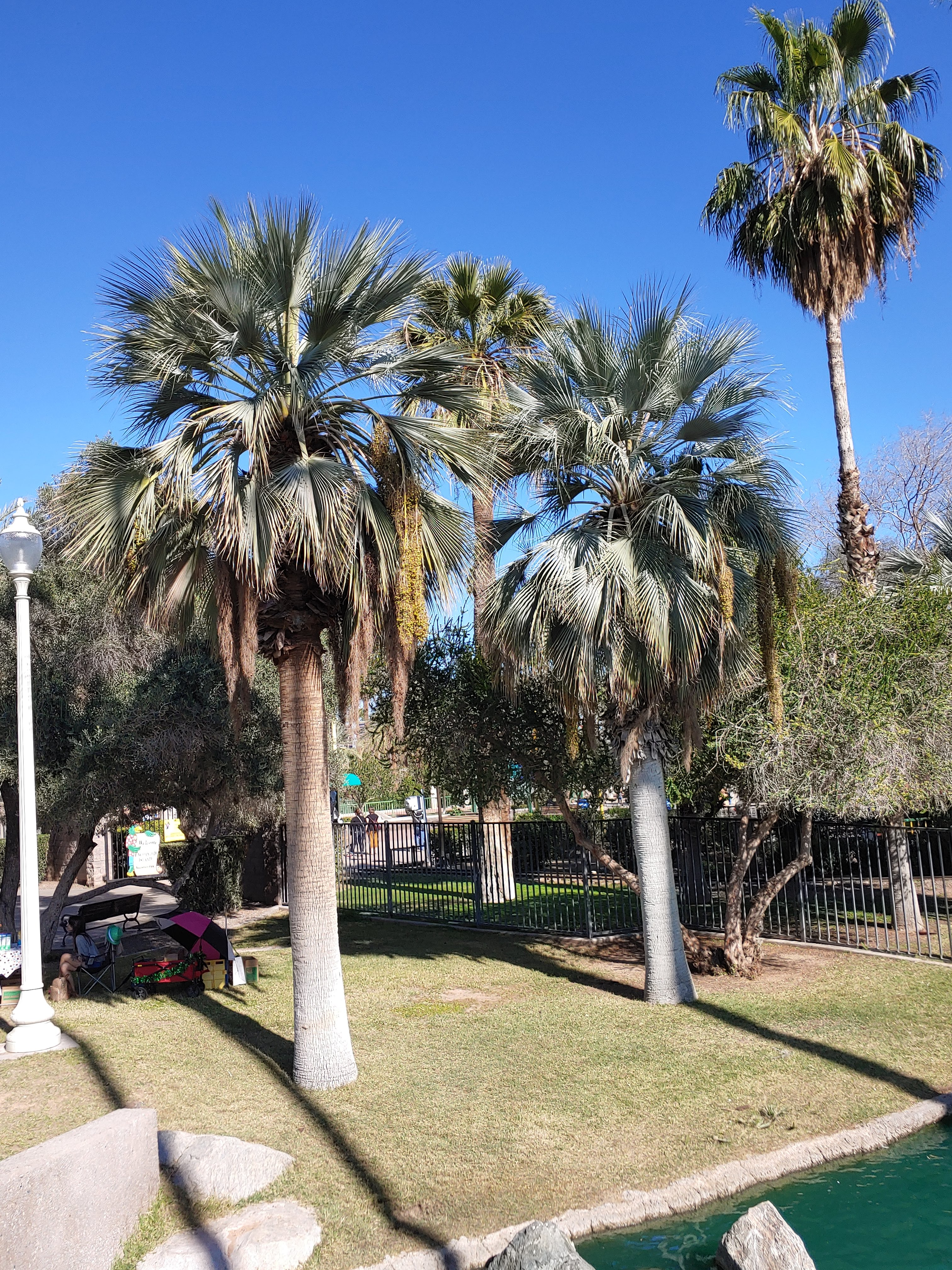
Mature pair of Brahea armata, Phoenix AZ

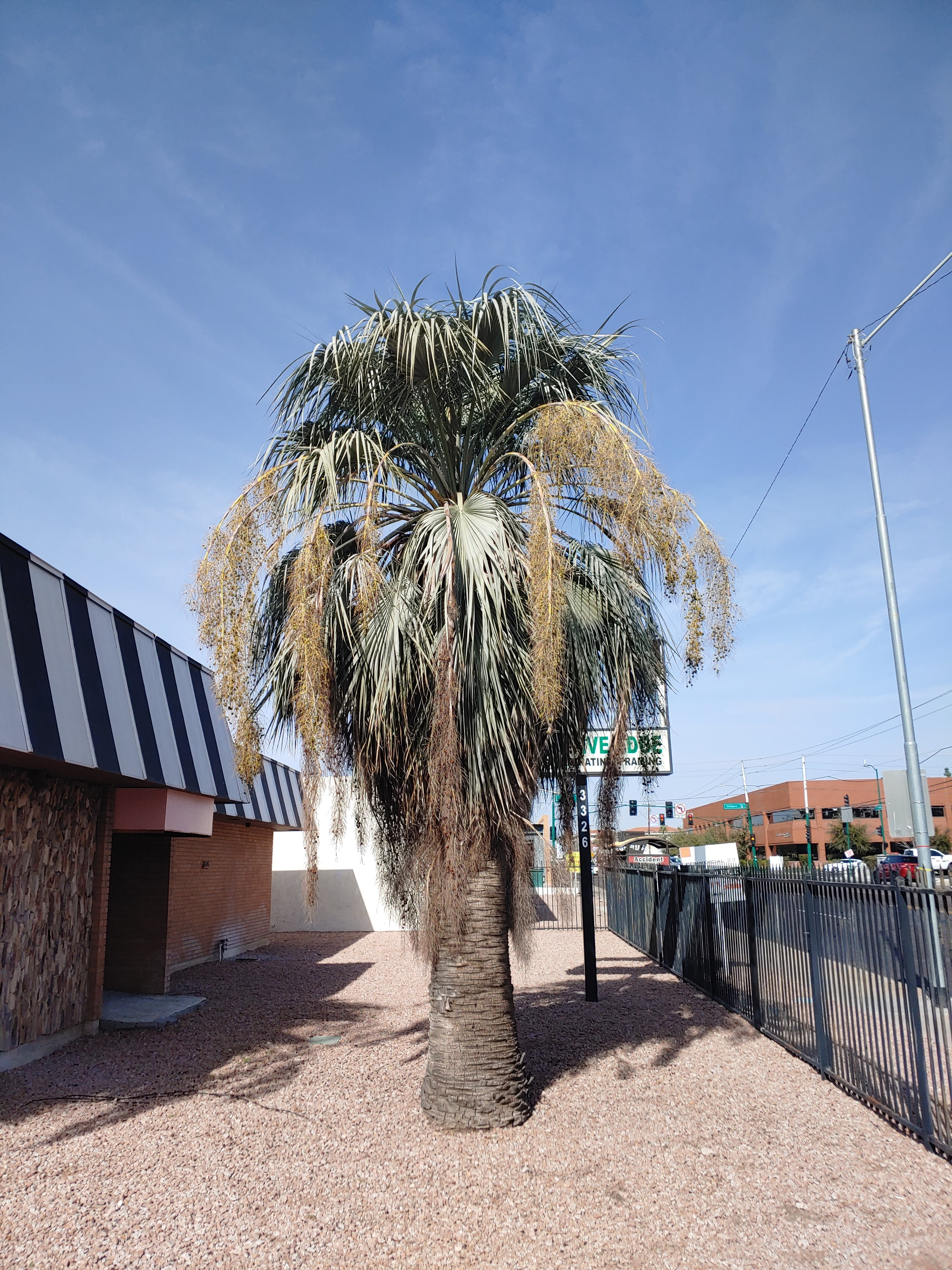
Brahea armata setting seed

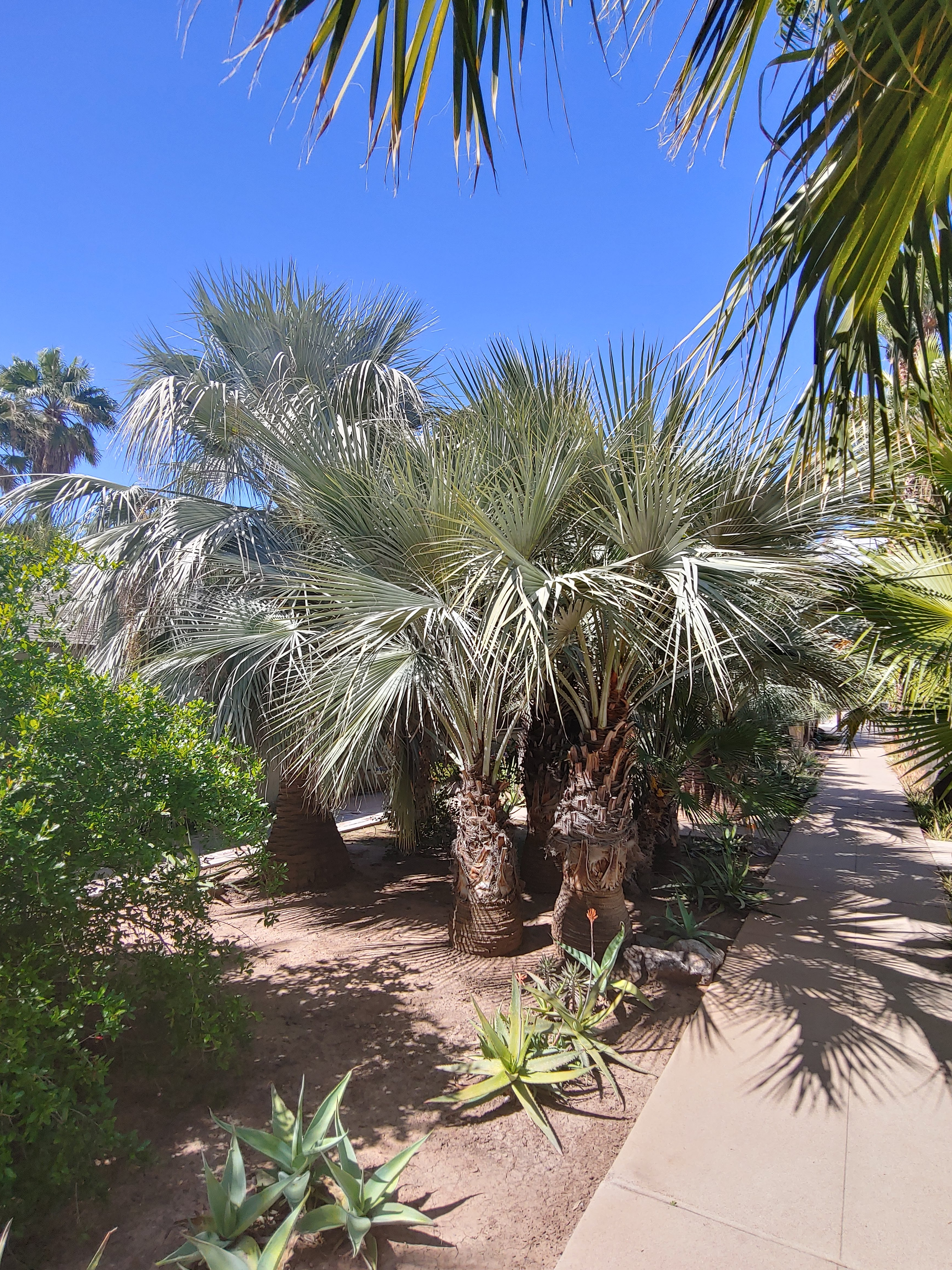
Group planting of Brahea armata, Phoenix, AZ

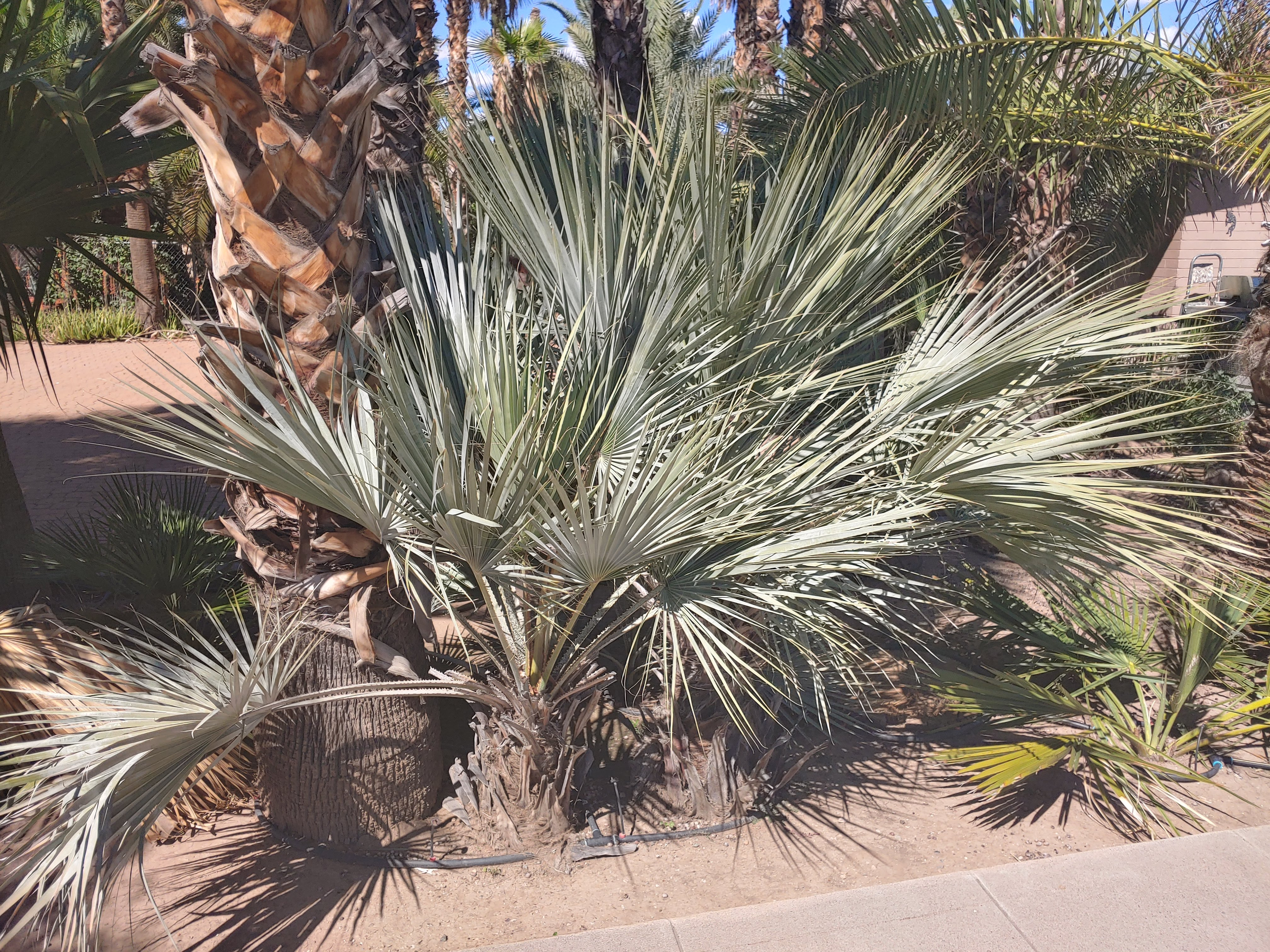
Juvenile pair of Brahea armata

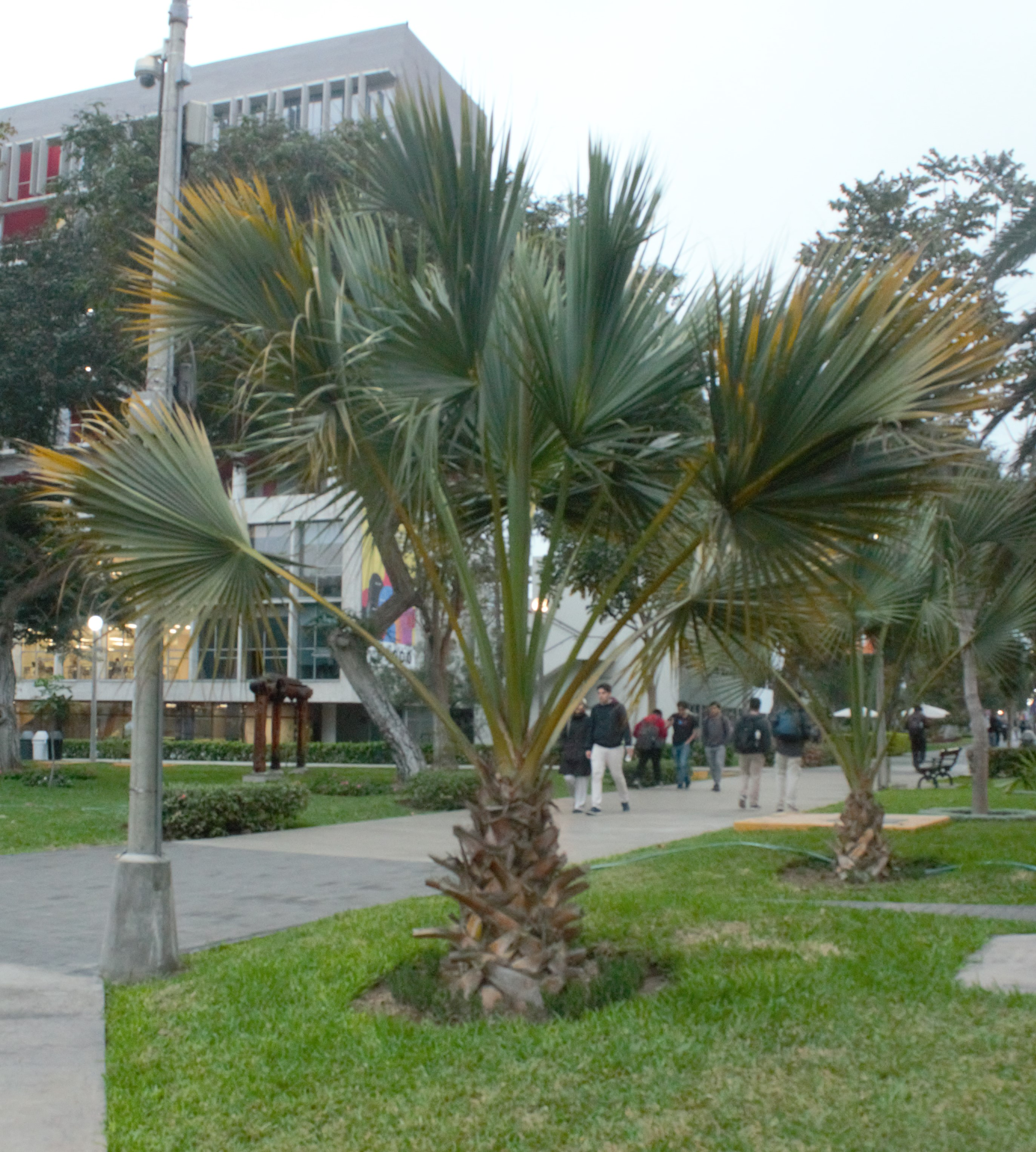
Brahea armata near PUCP

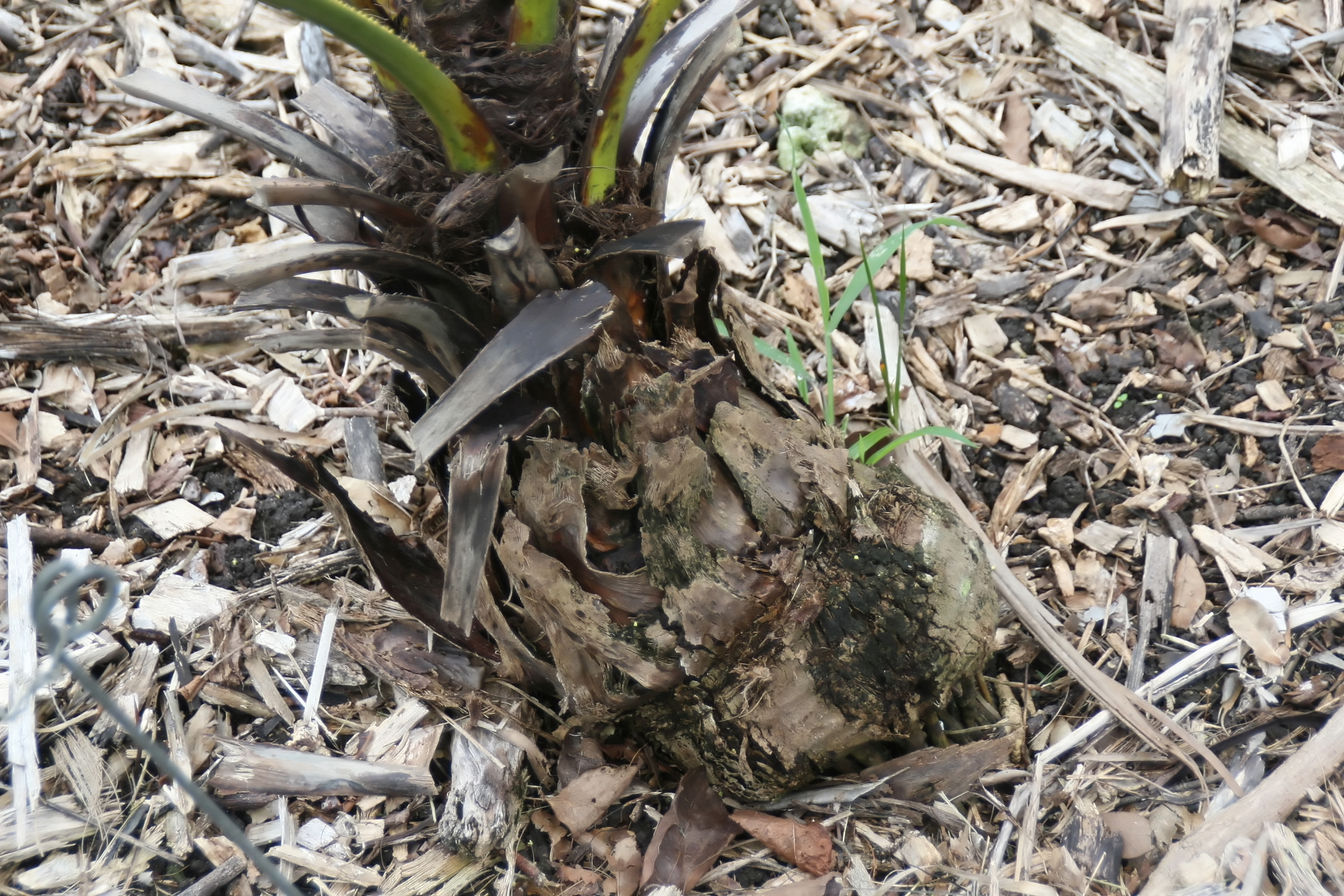
Trunk
