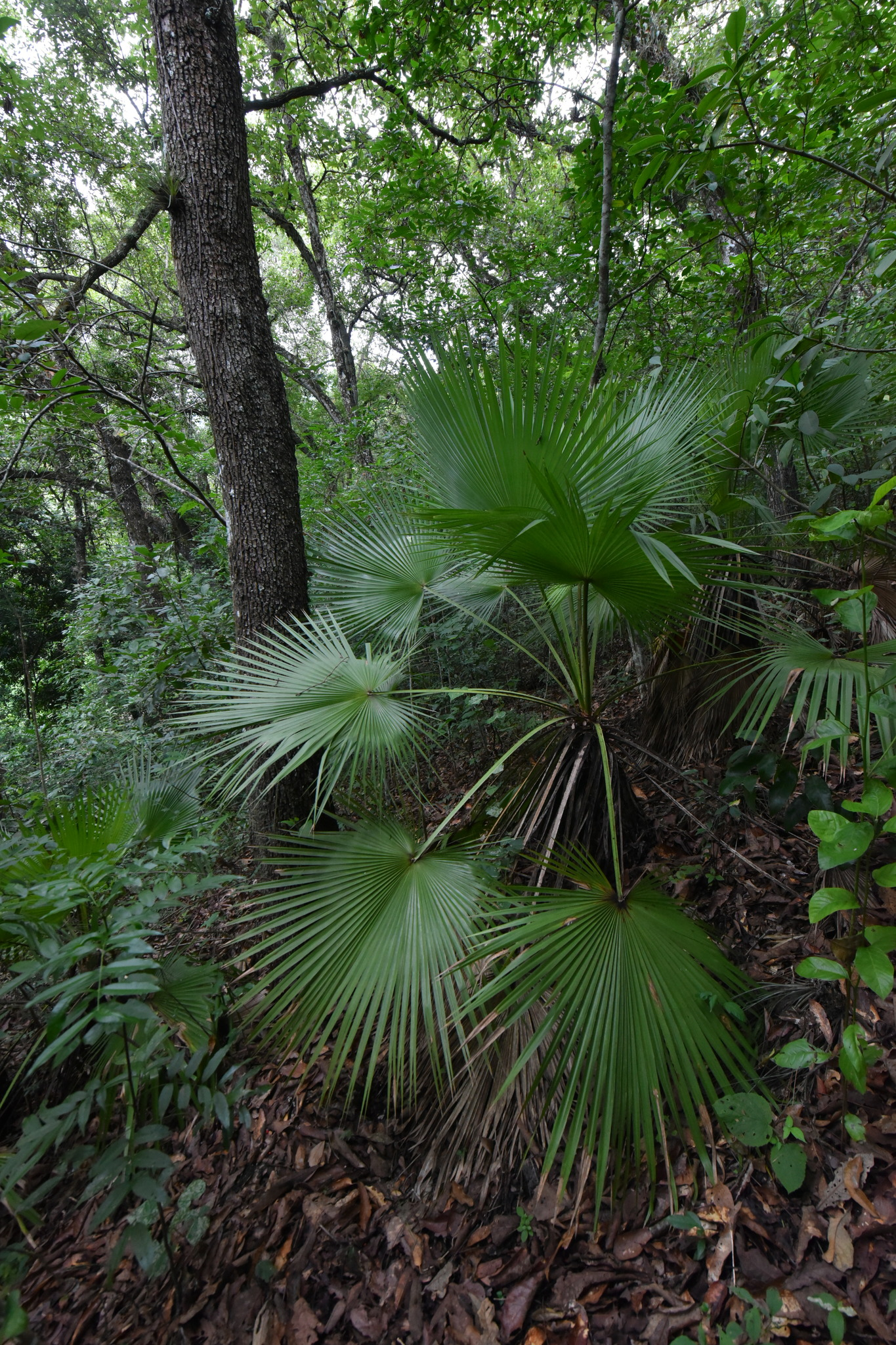
- In the wild, Mexico
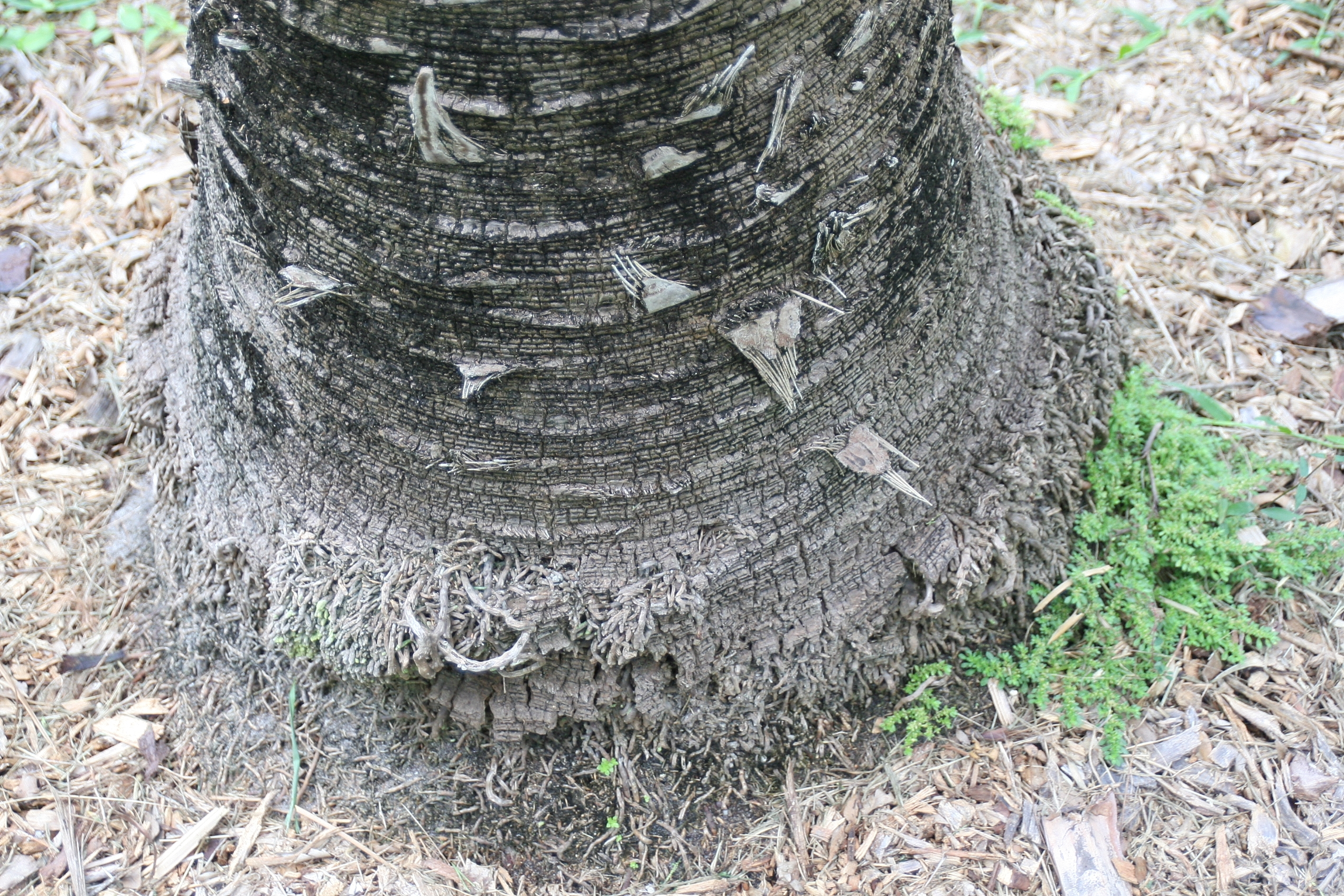
- Base of trunk

Conservation status
- Least Concern (IUCN 3.1)

Scientific classification
- Kingdom: Plantae
- Clade: Tracheophytes
- Clade: Angiosperms
- Clade: Monocots
- Clade: Commelinids
- Order: Arecales
- Family: Arecaceae
- Tribe: Trachycarpeae
- Genus: Brahea
- Species: B. dulcis

Binomial name
- Brahea dulcis (Kunth) Mart.

Synonyms
- List: Acoelorraphe schippii (Burret) Dahlgren; Brahea bella L.H.Bailey; Brahea berlandieri Bartlett; Brahea conzattii Bartlett; Brahea dulcis f. humilis Miranda; Brahea dulcis var. montereyensis (Becc.) Becc.; Brahea edulis var. montereyensis Becc.; Brahea frigida Devansaye; Brahea schippii Burret; Copernicia depressa Liebm. ex Dalgren; Corypha dulcis Kunth; Corypha frigida Mohl ex Mart.; Livistona occidentalis Hook.f.; Thrinax tunica Hook.f.

= Brahea dulcis =

Species of plant

Brahea dulcis, the sweet hesper palm or apak palm, is a species of flowering plant in the family Arecaceae. It is native to dry woodlands of Mexico, Guatemala, Belize, El Salvador, and Honduras. A single-trunked palm reaching 7.5 m (25 ft) with edible fruit and green to blue-green leaves, it is occasionally available from commercial suppliers.

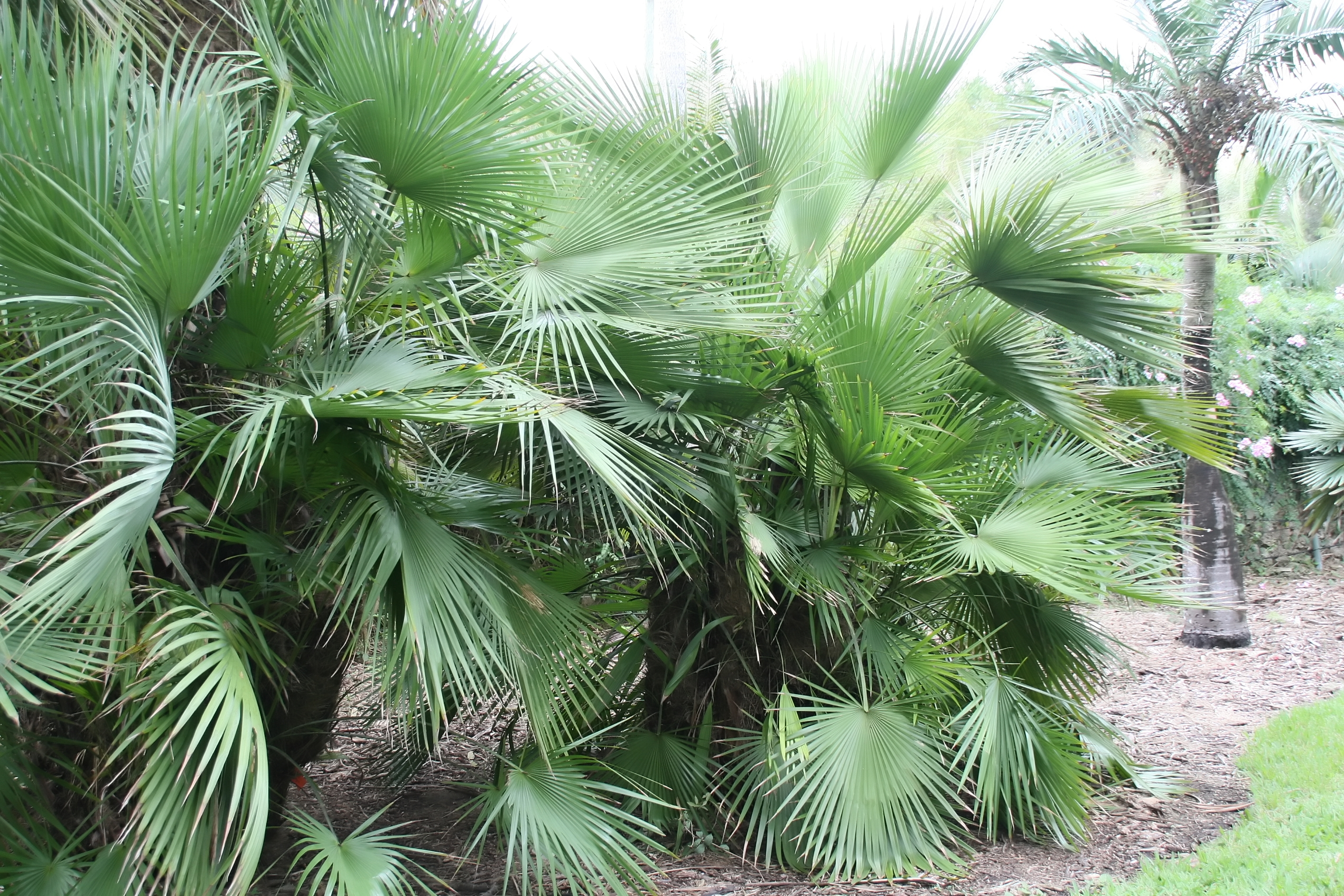
At Fairchild Tropical Botanic Garden
