= Quercus seemannii =

Scientific classification
- Kingdom: Plantae
- Clade: Embryophytes
- Clade: Tracheophytes
- Clade: Spermatophytes
- Clade: Angiosperms
- Clade: Eudicots
- Clade: Rosids
- Order: Fagales
- Family: Fagaceae
- Genus: Quercus
- Subgenus: Quercus subg. Quercus
- Section: Quercus sect. Lobatae
- Species: Q. seemannii

Binomial name
- Quercus seemannii Liebm.

Synonyms
- Quercus boquetensis Standl.; Quercus eugeniifolia f. petiolata Trel.; Quercus flagellifera Trel.; Quercus petiolata (Trel.) A.E.Murray, nom. illeg.; Quercus pittieri Wesm. ex Seemen, no Latin descr.; Quercus salicifolia var. seemannii (Liebm.) Wenz.

Species of plant

Quercus seemannii is a species of flowering plant in the family Fagaceae, native from southeastern Mexico to Central America. It was first described by Frederik Liebmann in 1854. It is placed in section Lobatae.

== Distribution ==
Quercus seemannii is native to southeastern Mexico, Costa Rica, El Salvador, Guatemala, Honduras, Nicaragua, and Panama.
