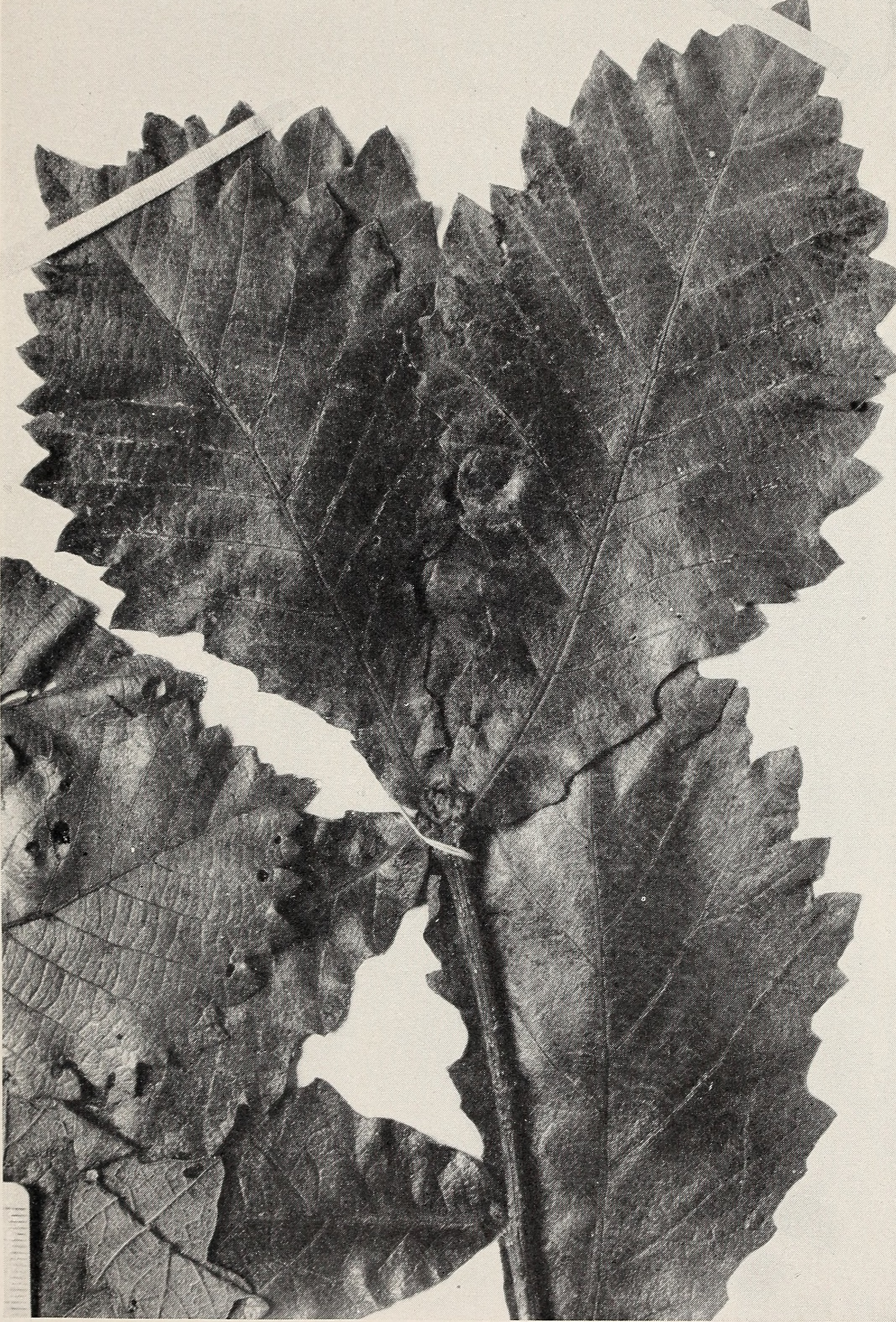

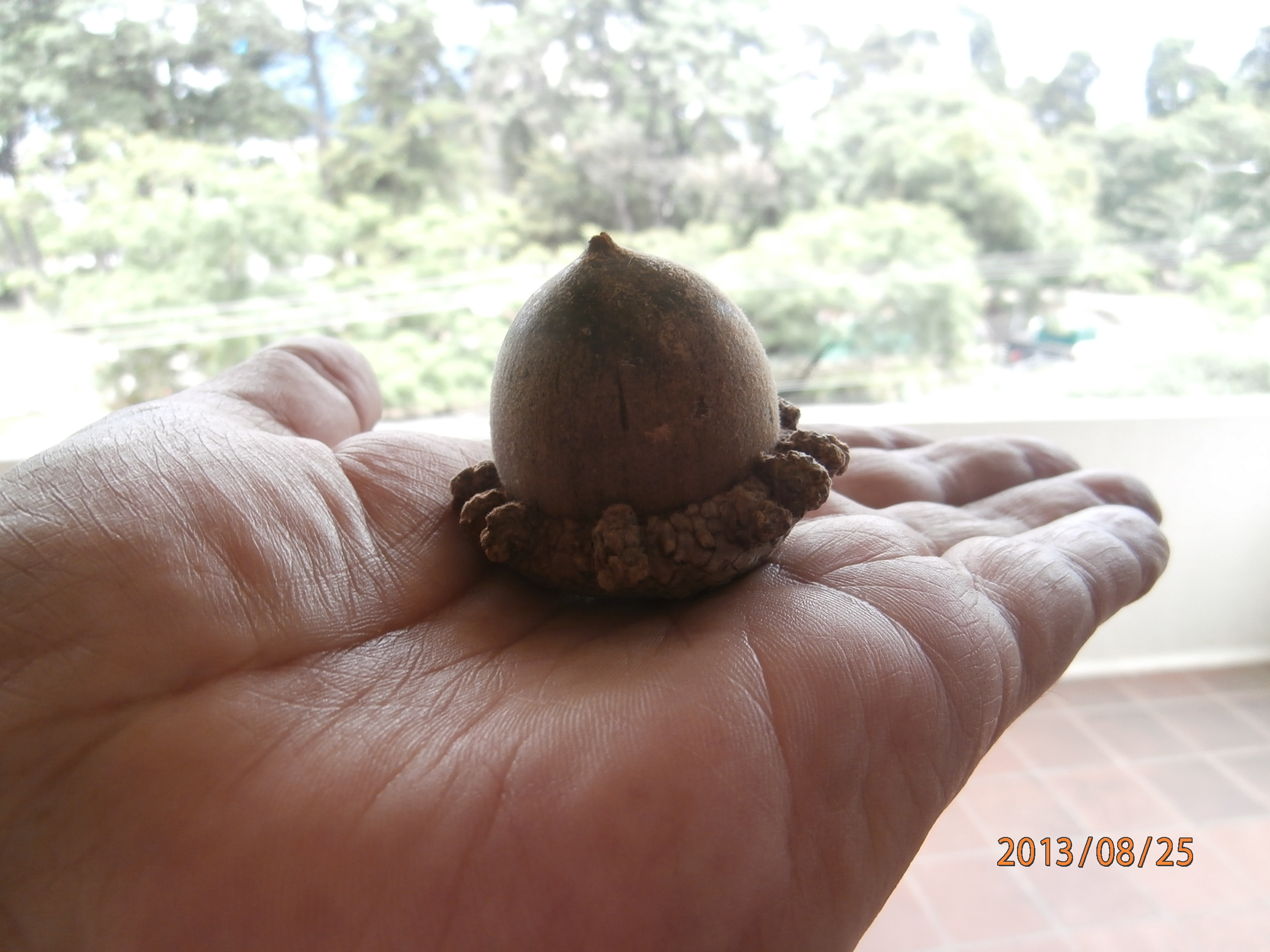

Conservation status
- Least Concern (IUCN 3.1)

Scientific classification
- Kingdom: Plantae
- Clade: Embryophytes
- Clade: Tracheophytes
- Clade: Spermatophytes
- Clade: Angiosperms
- Clade: Eudicots
- Clade: Rosids
- Order: Fagales
- Family: Fagaceae
- Genus: Quercus
- Subgenus: Quercus subg. Quercus
- Section: Quercus sect. Quercus
- Species: Q. peduncularis

Binomial name
- Quercus peduncularis Née

Synonyms
- List: Quercus achoteana Trel.; Quercus affinis M.Martens & Galeotti, nom. illeg.; Quercus aguana Trel.; Quercus arachnoidea Trel.; Quercus barbanthera Trel.; Quercus barbeyana Trel.; Quercus callosa Benth.; Quercus dolichopus E.F.Warb.; Quercus martensiana Trel.; Quercus pilicaulis Trel.; Quercus splendens Née; Quercus tomentosa Willd.

= Quercus peduncularis =

Species of oak tree

Quercus peduncularis is an oak native to Mexico and Central America, ranging from Jalisco to Honduras.

It is placed in the white oak group, Quercus section Quercus.

== Description ==
Quercus peduncularis is a small tree growing up to 4 metres (13 feet) tall. The leaves are thick and leathery, up to 10 centimetres (4 inches) long, lance-shaped or egg-shaped with 9–14 pairs of pointed teeth on the edges.

== Distribution ==
Quercus peduncularis is native to central, southeastern and southwestern Mexico, including Veracruz, Belize, El Salvador, Guatemala and Honduras.
