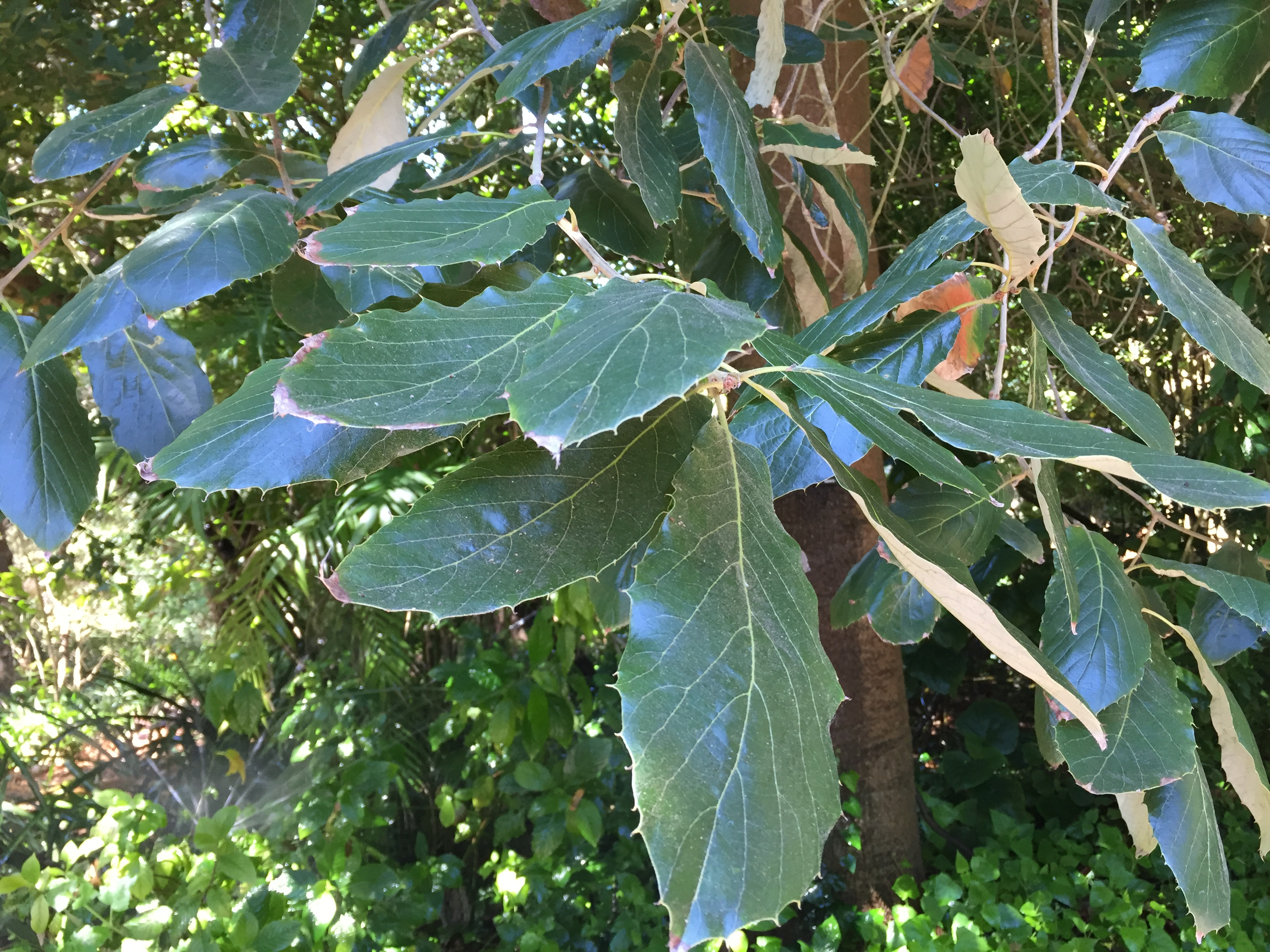

Conservation status
- Least Concern (IUCN 3.1)

Scientific classification
- Kingdom: Plantae
- Clade: Embryophytes
- Clade: Tracheophytes
- Clade: Spermatophytes
- Clade: Angiosperms
- Clade: Eudicots
- Clade: Rosids
- Order: Fagales
- Family: Fagaceae
- Genus: Quercus
- Subgenus: Quercus subg. Quercus
- Section: Quercus sect. Lobatae
- Species: Q. calophylla

Binomial name
- Quercus calophylla Schltdl. & Cham.

Synonyms
- List: Quercus acuminata M.Martens & Galeotti; Quercus alamo Benth.; Quercus candicans f. alligata Trel.; Quercus candicans f. incurva Trel.; Quercus candicans f. michoacana Trel.; Quercus chimaltenangensis f. gemmata C.H.Mull.; Quercus flavida Liebm.; Quercus intermedia M.Martens & Galeotti, nom. illeg.; Quercus pagoda f. intermedia (M.Martens & Galeotti) Trel.; Quercus umbrosa Endl.

= Quercus calophylla =

Species of oak tree

Quercus calophylla is a Mesoamerican species of oak tree. It is native to mountain forests of central and southern Mexico, Guatemala, and El Salvador. It has incorrectly been known as Quercus candicans.

Common names include ahuahuaxtl, ahuamextli, encino blanco, encino cenizo, encino de agua, encino papatla, huilocualoni, popocamay, tzacui blanco, and tzaquioco.

== Description ==
It is a deciduous tree growing 8 to 25 m (26 to 82 ft) tall with a trunk as much as 100 centimetres (39 inches) in diameter. The leaves are stiff and leathery, rigid, up to 23.5 cm (9 1/4 in) long, egg-shaped with numerous pointed teeth along the edges.

== Taxonomy ==
In 2018, it was found that the type specimen of Quercus candicans was actually a misidentified Roldana, a plant in the aster family (Asteraceae). The correct name of this species is Quercus calophylla. Forms placed in Quercus candicans by Trelease do belong here.

== Habitat and range ==
Quercus calophylla grows in wet montane forests, typically cloud forests but also humid oak forests and pine–oak forests, from 1,200 to 2,700 metres (3,900 to 8,900 feet). It prefers calcareous soils.

Its range includes the Sierra Madre Occidental of Sonora, Chihuahua, Durango, Sinaloa, and Nayarit states, the Sierra Madre Oriental of San Luis Potosí, Hidalgo, Puebla, and Veracruz, The Trans-Mexican Volcanic Belt of Jalisco, Colima, Michoacán, Guanajuato, Mexico City, and Mexico State, the Sierra Madre de Oaxaca of Oaxaca, the Sierra Madre del Sur of Guerrero and Oaxaca, and the Sierra Madre de Chiapas of Chiapas, Guatemala, and El Salvador.

== Conservation ==
Quercus calophylla has been affected by habitat loss from extensive deforestation across most of its range. Its conservation status is Least Concern. Strong regeneration has been observed at the edges of disturbed areas with intermediate shade.
