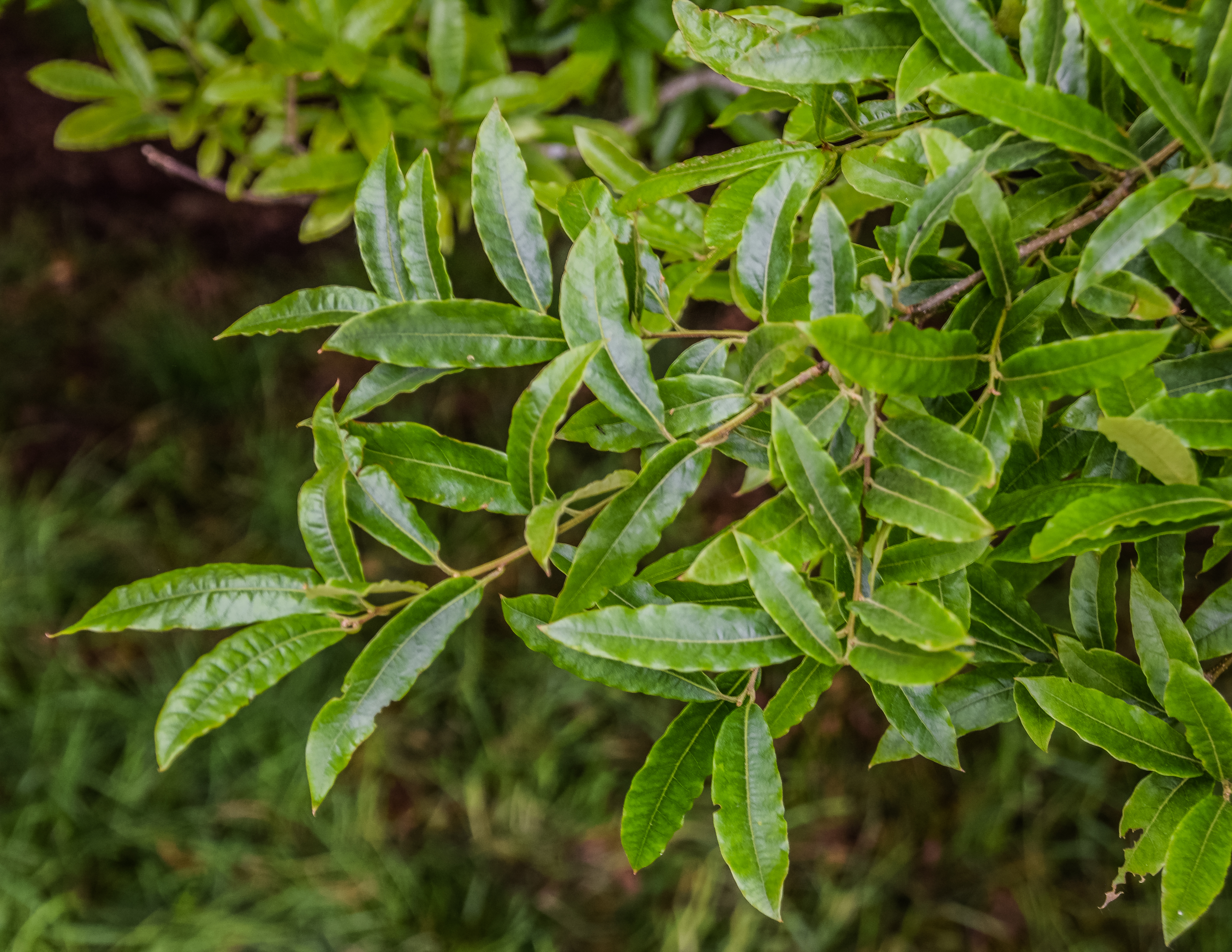

Conservation status
- Least Concern (IUCN 3.1)

Scientific classification
- Kingdom: Plantae
- Clade: Embryophytes
- Clade: Tracheophytes
- Clade: Spermatophytes
- Clade: Angiosperms
- Clade: Eudicots
- Clade: Rosids
- Order: Fagales
- Family: Fagaceae
- Genus: Quercus
- Subgenus: Quercus subg. Quercus
- Section: Quercus sect. Lobatae
- Species: Q. salicifolia

Binomial name
- Quercus salicifolia Née

Synonyms
- List: Cerris salicifolia (Née) Raf.; Quercus acapulcensis Trel.; Quercus castanea var. glabrata (Liebm. ex Seem.) A.DC.; Quercus duratifolia C.H.Mull.; Quercus mexicana var. glabrata Liebm. ex Seem.; Quercus tahuasalana Trel.

= Quercus salicifolia =

Species of oak tree

Quercus salicifolia is a species of oak. It is native to central and southern Mexico and Central America, from Jalisco to Panama.

== Description ==
Quercus salicifolia is a tree up to 25 metres (82 feet) tall, with a trunk up to 100 centimetres (39 inches) in diameter. The leaves are narrowly lance-shaped, up to 20 cm (8 in) long, with no teeth or lobes.

The epithet "salicifolia" means "willow-leaved" alluding to the resemblance between the leaves of Q. salicifolia and those of several species of Salix.
