= Frederik Liebmann =

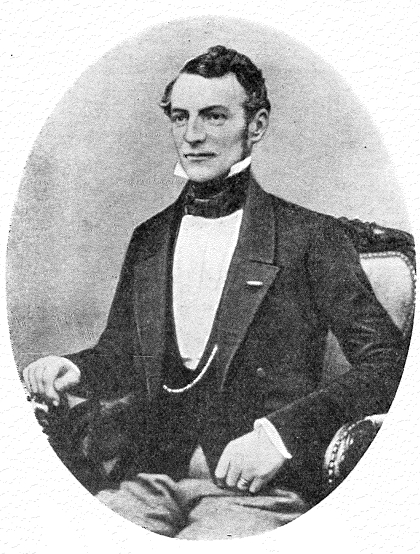
Frederik Liebmann.

Frederik Michael Liebmann (10 October 1813 – 29 October 1856) was a Danish botanist. Liebmann studied botany at the University of Copenhagen, although he never obtained a formal qualification. He went on study tours of Germany and Norway before becoming lecturer at the Danish Royal Veterinary School in 1837. In 1840 he travelled to Cuba and Mexico; on his return in 1845 he was appointed Professor of Botany at the University of Copenhagen. He became Director of the university's Botanical Garden in 1852, a post he held until his death four years later.

He was the editor of Flora Danica and issued fasc. 41-43 (1845–1852) and Supplement vol. 1, a total of 240 plates.

== Legacy ==
Liebmann is commemorated in the scientific name of a species of Mexican snake, Chersodromus liebmanni.
