= Ranman (TV series) =

- Genre: Drama
- Created by: Ikue Osada
- Directed by: Yoshio Watanabe; Atsuko Tsuda; Takashi Fukagawa
- Starring: Ryūnosuke Kamiki; Minami Hamabe; Jun Shison; Yui Sakuma; Aoi Nakamura; Riko Narumi; Mamoru Miyano; Hiroshi Miyama; Emma Miyazawa; Tetsuhiro Ikeda; Shunsuke Daito; Kou Maehara; Mizuki Maehara; Tetsushi Tanaka; Yasufumi Terawaki; Ryōko Hirosue; Mayu Tsuruta; Jun Kaname; Seiichi Tanabe; Seikō Itō; Eiji Okuda; Keiko Matsuzaka
- Narrated by: Aoi Miyazaki
- Opening theme: "Ai no Hana" by Aimyon
- Composer: Umitaro Abe
- Country of origin: Japan
- Original language: Japanese

Production
- Producers: Maiko Itagaki; Toshinobu Asanuma; Norihisa Fujiwara
- Running time: 15 minutes

Original release
- Network: NHK
- Release: April 3 – September 29, 2023

Ranman (らんまん) is a Japanese television drama series and the 108th Asadora series, following Maiagare!. It premiered on April 3, 2023. The drama is modeled after the life of Japanese botanist Tomitaro Makino, but it is produced as fiction and is an original drama work.

== Cast ==
=== Makino's family ===
- Ryūnosuke Kamiki as Mantarō Makino
  - Yurito Mori as young Mantarō
  - Masahito Kobayashi as 9-to-12-year-old Mantarō
- Minami Hamabe as Sueko Nishimura, Mantarō's wife
- Sakura Endō (Nogizaka46) as Chitose Makino, Mantarō and Sueko's daughter and Kotetsu's wife
- Kōdai Matsuoka as Momoki Makino, Mantarō and Sueko's son
- Miyu Honda as Chizuru Makino, Mantarō and Sueko's youngest daughter
  - Keiko Matsuzaka as old Chizuru

=== Mineya people ===
- Yui Sakuma as Aya Makino, Mantarō's sister
- Jun Shison as Takeo, son of the clerk of the sake brewery "Mineya"
- Show Kasamatsu as Kōkichi, a brewer at "Mineya"
- Riho Nakamura as Tama, a maid at "Mineya"
- Ryōko Hirosue as Hisa Makino, Mantarō's mother
- Keiko Matsuzaka as Taki Makino, Mantarō's grandmother

=== Kochi version ===
- Wakako Shimazaki as Kie Kusuno, a civil rights movement supporter
- Yasufumi Terawaki as Rankō Ikeda, head of the academic institution "Meikyoukan"
- Dean Fujioka as Tengu / Sakamoto Ryōma
- Mamoru Miyano as Itsuma Hayakawa, a freedom and civil rights activist in Kochi
- Ryudo Uzaki as Nakahama Manjirō
- Hiroshi Miyama as Gihei Hamamura, owner of "Sengokuya", a kimono merchant in Kochi

=== Tokyo version ===
- Riho Makise as Matsu Nishimura, Sueko's mother
- Mansaku Ikeuchi as Bunta Abe, confectioner at Hakubaido
- Aoi Nakamura as Yūichirō Hirose, Mantaro's schoolmate who working in the Ministry of Engineering.
- Seiichi Tanabe as Motoyoshi Noda, a botanist
- Seikō Itō as Yoshio Satonaka, a botanist

==== related persons the restaurant “Misato” ====
- Emma Miyazawa as Mie Kasazaki, Sueko's aunt and Matsu's sister
- Sarutoki Minagawa as Yanosuke Iwasaki, an industrialist
- Koen Kondo as Tadanori Onda, an army colonel
- Ryū Morioka as Keiichi Aijima, Ministry of Communications Railway Agency bureaucrat
- Sōma Suzuki as Michinari Kakegawa, a politician

==== The University of Tokyo Persons ====
- Jun Kaname as Akihisa Tanabe, a founding professor of the Department of Botany, University of Tokyo
- Tetsushi Tanaka as Seiichi Tokunaga, an associate professor at the Department of Botany, University of Tokyo
- Hiroki Konno as Shozaburo Ōkubo, an Lecturer in the Department of Botany, University of Tokyo
- Kou Maehara as Yasuhisa Hatano, an student in the Department of Botany, University of Tokyo
- Mizuki Maehara as Jiro Hujimaru, an student in the Department of Botany, University of Tokyo
- Hiroshi Yamamoto as Hideyoshi Mimasaka, a professor at the University of Tokyo

==== Jiitoku row house ====
- Shunsuke Daito as Hayato Kuraki, former elite samurai
- Riko Narumi as Ei Kuraki, Hayato's wife
- Tetsuhiro Ikeda as Fukuji Oikawa
- Tamae Ando as Rin Eguchi, manager of Jutoku Nagaya
- Kasumi Yamaya as Yū Usami, maid at small restaurant
- Tatsuya Yamawaki as Jōnosuke Horii, a failed student who attends the Faculty of Letters at the University of Tokyo.
- Takashi Sumida as Ushikutei Kyubei, a storyteller who lives in Jutoku Nagaya.

==== Ohata Printing Office ====
- Eiji Okuda as Gihei Ōhata, factory owner of Ohata Printing Office
- Mayu Tsuruta as Ichi Ōhata, Gihei's wife
- Meimi Tamura as Kayo Ōhata, Gihei and Ichi's daughter

==== People around Sueko ====
- Kanata Irei as Masanori Takatō, former Satsuma samurai businessman
- Ariei Umefune as Yae Takatō, Masanori's wife
- Takeshi Kongochi as Kashima, Masanori's secretary
- Ananda Jacobs as Clara Lawrence, Sueko's music and dance teacher
- Seina Nakata as Satoko Tanabe, Akihisa's wife, Sueko's friend
- Atsuko Fukuda as a maid of the Tanabe family

==== People of Shibuya ====
- Tateto Serizawa as Satarō Aratani, The owner of the pub "Aratani".
- Masayo Umezawa as Kane Aratani, Satarō's mother
- Jun Inoue as Hiroshi Sato,"Kōbō-yu" owner
- Noriko Iriyama as Toyoka, former Yanagibashi geisha
- Rion Misaki as Hazuki, former Yanagibashi geisha
- Naoto Kaihō as Ichizo Kobayashi, an industrialist
- Zen Ishikawa as Ryōtarō Saeki, a senior government official
- Ichirō Mikami as Eiken Shirakawa, former councillor
- Mizuki Machida as Masamune Nasukawa, director of the Japan Orchestra Association

=== Others ===
- Daisuke Ono as Sengokuya
- Hisahiro Ogura as Nakao, a pawn shop owner
- Kazu Murakami as Matsuya
- Masahiro Sato as Ikedaya
- Satoshi Hashimoto as Mori Arinori, first Minister of Education, a benefactor of Akihisa Tanabe
- Yasuyuki Sakai as a doctor
- Nasubi as a package delivery man
- Naomasa Musaka as Isobe, a debt collector
- Tatsuomi Hamada as Kotetsu Yamamoto
  - Kokoro Terada as young Kotetsu
- Taishi Nakagawa as Tōru Nagamori

== TV schedule ==
Week	Episodes	Title	Directed by	Original airdate	Rating
1	1–5	"Baikaōren" (バイカオウレン, Coptis quinquefolia)	Yoshio Watanabe	April 3–7, 2023	15.4%
2	6–10	"Kinseiran" (キンセイラン, Calanthe nipponica)	Yoshio Watanabe	April 10–14, 2023	15.1%
3	11–15	"Jōrōhototogisu" (ジョウロウホトトギス, Tricyrtis macrantha)	Yoshio Watanabe	April 17–21, 2023	15.8%
4	16–20	"Sasayuri" (ササユリ, Lilium japonicum)	Atsuko Tsuda	April 24–28, 2023	15.8%
5	21–25	"Kitsunenokamisori" (キツネノカミソリ, Lycoris sanguinea)	Atsuko Tsuda	May 1–5, 2023	14.4%
6	26–30	"Dokudami" (ドクダミ, Houttuynia cordata)	Yoshio Watanabe	May 8–12, 2023	16.5%
7	31–35	"Botan" (ボタン, Paeonia suffruticosa)	Yoshio Watanabe	May 15–19, 2023	16.3%
8	36–40	"Shirotsumekusa" (シロツメクサ, Trifolium repens)	Atsuko Tsuda	May 22–26, 2023	16.3%
9	41–45	"Hirumushiro" (ヒルムシロ, Potamogeton distinctus)	Takashi Fukagawa	May 29 – June 2, 2023	16.1%
10	46–50	"Noazami" (ノアザミ, Cirsium japonicum)	Takashi Fukagawa	June 5–9, 2023	16.5%
11	51–55	"Yūgao" (ユウガオ, Lagenaria siceraria var. hispida)	Tetsuya Watanabe	June 12–16, 2023	17.1%
12	56–60	"Marubamannengusa" (マルバマンネングサ, Sedum makinoi)	Yoshio Watanabe	June 19–23, 2023	17.3%
13	61–65	"Yamazakura" (ヤマザクラ, Cerasus jamasakura)	Yoshio Watanabe	June 26–30, 2023	17.0%
14	66–70	"Hōraishida" (ホウライシダ, Adiantum capillus-veneris)	Takashi Fukagawa	July 3–7, 2023	17.0%
15	71–75	"Yamatogusa" (ヤマトグサ, Theligonum japonica Okubo et Makino)	Shin'ichirō Ishikawa	July 10–14, 2023	17.1%
16	76–80	"Kōrogiran" (コオロギラン, Stigmatodactylus sikokianus Maxim. ex Makino)	Atsuko Tsuda	July 17–21, 2023	16.3%
17	81–85	"Mujinamo" (ムジナモ, Aldrovanda vesiculosa)	Tetsuya Watanabe	July 24–28, 2023	16.8%
18	86–90	"Himesumire" (ヒメスミレ, Viola inconspicua subsp. nagasakiensis)	Yoshio Watanabe	July 31 – August 4, 2023	16.8%
19	91–95	"Yakkosō" (ヤッコソウ, Mitrastemon yamamotoi Makino)	Yoshio Watanabe	August 7–11, 2023	16.8%
20	96–100	"Kirengeshōma" (キレンゲショウマ, Kirengeshoma palmata)	Takashi Fukagawa	August 14–18, 2023	17.1%
21	101–105	"Nojigiku" (ノジギク, Chrysanthemum japonense)	Atsuko Tsuda	August 21–25, 2023	17.4%
22	106–110	"Ōgyōchi" (オーギョーチ, Ficus pumila var. awkeotsang)	Naoki Kobayashi	August 28 – September 1, 2023	17.5%
23	111–115	"Yamamomo" (ヤマモモ, Morella rubra)	Shin'ichirō Ishikawa	September 4–8, 2023	17.8%
24	116–120	"Tsuchitorimochi" (ツチトリモチ, Balanophora japonica)	Hiroshi Kaida and Takashi Fukagawa	September 11–15, 2023	17.1%
25	121–125	"Murasakikatabami" (ムラサキカタバミ, Oxalis debilis)	Yoshio Watanabe	September 18–22, 2023	17.3%
26	126–130	"Suekozasa" (スエコザサ, Sasaella ramosa var. suwekoana)	Yoshio Watanabe	September 25–29, 2023	17.6%
Average rating 16.6% - Rating is based on Japanese Video Research (Kantō region).

Preceded by Maiagare!	Asadora; April 3, 2023 – September 29	Succeeded by Boogie Woogie
