= C20H20O6 =

The molecular formula C_{20}H_{20}O_{6} (molar mass: 356.37 g/mol, exact mass: 356.1260 u) may refer to:

- Balanophonin, a neo-lignan
- Pluviatilol, a lignan
