= Danilo N. Tandang =

Filipino botanist

Danilo Tandang is a Filipino botanist (plant taxonomist), working at the National Museum of the Philippines, Philippines. He is a main contributor to Co's Digital Flora of the Philippines, by Leonard Co. Additionally, he conducts research on the Philippine flowering plants.

The standard author abbreviation Tandang is used to indicate this person as the author when citing a botanical name.

== Species described ==
- Corybas kaiganganianus
- Begonia normaaguilarae
- Decaisnina tomentosa
- Vaccinium carmesianum
- Dischidia argentii
- Dischidia glabrata
- Begonia burabod
- Begonia tarangban
- Begonia sohoton
- Begonia benitotanii
- Amylotheca cleofei
- Hypericum perryongii
- Corybas boholensis
- Begonia truncatifolia
- Begonia beijnenii
- Begonia cabanillasii
- Begonia droseroides
- Begonia gabaldonensis
- Begonia madulidii
- Corybas circinatus
- Dilochia deleoniae
- Mycetia suedixieana
- Mycetia dagohoyana
- Timonius sulitii
- Timonius noli-tangere
- Ixora alejandroi
- Hoya irisiae
- Nepenthes barcelonae
- Balanophora coralliformis
- Begonia titoevangelistae
- Rafflesia magnifica

=== Taxa named after D.N.Tandang ===
- Begonia tandangii
