= B. japonica =

B. japonica may refer to:

- Balanophora japonica, a plant species
- Barnardia japonica, a bulbous flowering plant species
- Blera japonica, a hoverfly species
- Bombycilla japonica, the Japanese Waxwing, a fairly small passerine bird species found in north-east Asia
- Buddleja japonica, a plant species found in Honshu and Shikoku, Japan
- Buergeria japonica, the Ryukyu Kajika Frog or Ryukyu Kajikagaeru, a frog species found in Japan and Taiwan

== See also ==
- Japonica (disambiguation)
