= Begonia beijnenii =

Scientific classification
- Kingdom: Plantae
- Clade: Tracheophytes
- Clade: Angiosperms
- Clade: Eudicots
- Clade: Rosids
- Order: Cucurbitales
- Family: Begoniaceae
- Genus: Begonia
- Species: B. beijnenii

Binomial name
- Begonia beijnenii Y.P.Ang, Rubite, Tandang & R.Bustam.

Species of flowering plant

Begonia beijnenii is a species of flowering plant in the family Begoniaceae, native to the island of Palawan in the Philippines.

It was discovered in 2011, by a group of conservationists led by Dutch environmentalist Jonah van Beijnen trekking in Port Barton in Palawan. It is distinct from other Begonia species for being miniature in size and bearing variegated leaves. It is determined to be endemic at least to the town of San Vicente.

Begonia beijnenii was described in 2020 with the help from researchers from the Philippine Taxonomic Initiative (PTI) which was led by Yu Pin Ang, R.Bustam., Danilo N. Tandang, and Rosario Rubite. It is the 24th Begonia species described which is endemic in Palawan.
