= Hiroshi Takahashi =

Hiroshi Takahashi may refer to:

- Hiroshi Takahashi (architect) (高橋 ヒロシ, born 1953), Japanese architect
- Hiroshi Takahashi (artist) (高橋 ヒロシ, born 1965), Japanese manga artist
- Hiroshi Takahashi (baseball) (born 1946), Japanese baseball player (See 1964 in baseball)
- Hiroshi Takahashi (botanist) (born 1960), (See Tricyrtis chinensis)
- Hiroshi Takahashi (screenwriter) (See J-Horror Theater)
- Hiroshi Takahashi (table tennis) (高橋 浩), Japanese table tennis player
- Hiroshi Takahashi, chief of staff in the Japanese Korean Army
