= T. chinensis =

T. chinensis may refer to:

- Taxus chinensis, the Chinese yew, a conifer species
- Tricyrtis chinensis, a herbaceous plant species found in southeastern China
- Tsuga chinensis, the Taiwan or Chinese hemlock, a coniferous tree species native to China, Taiwan, Tibet and Vietnam
- Turbo chinensis, a sea snail species

== See also ==
- Chinensis (disambiguation)
