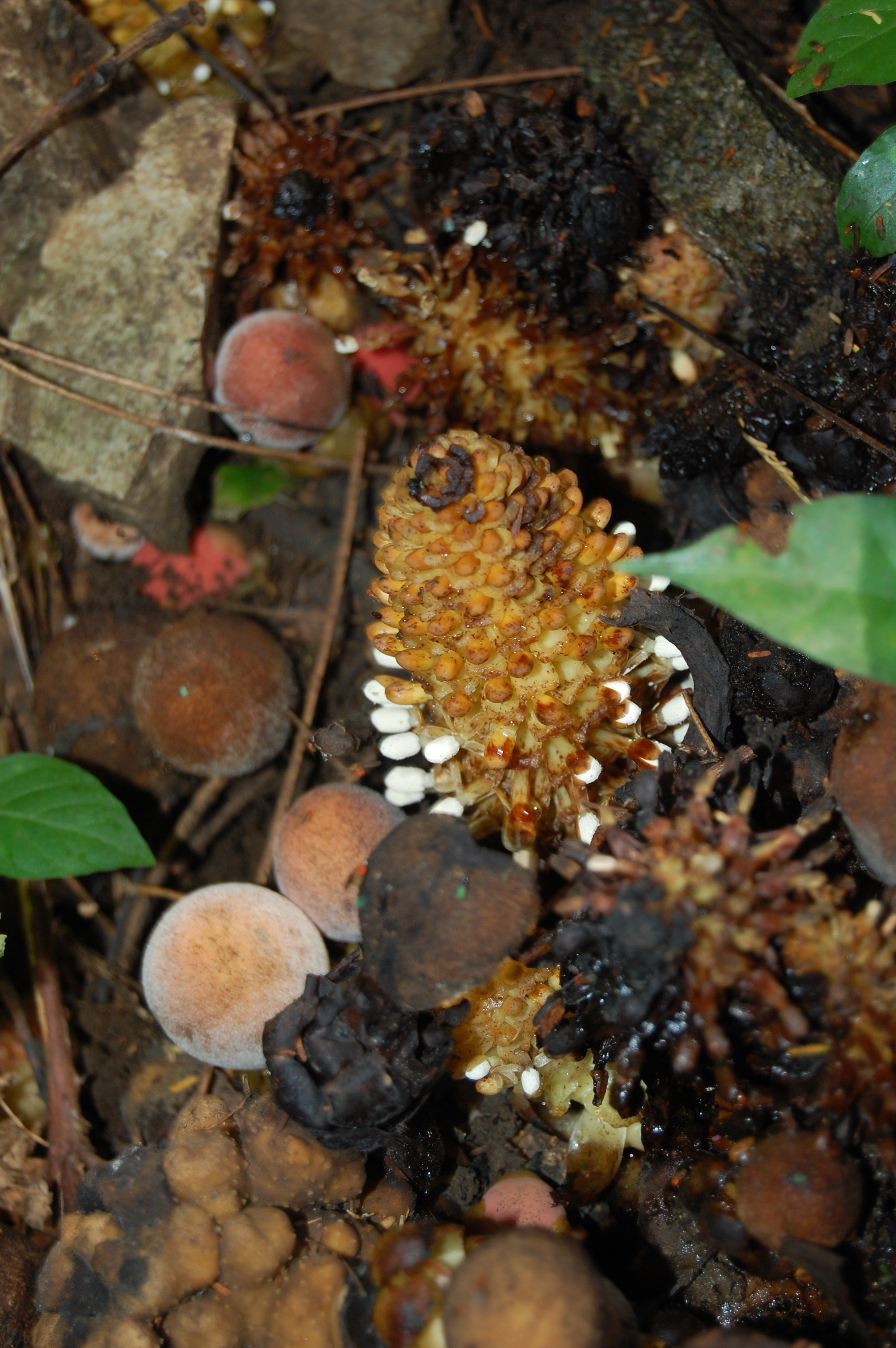
- Balanophora fungosa subsp. indica found in northwest Thailand (Hup Patad cave)

Scientific classification
- Kingdom: Plantae
- Clade: Tracheophytes
- Clade: Angiosperms
- Clade: Eudicots
- Order: Santalales
- Family: Balanophoraceae
- Genus: Balanophora; J.R.Forst. & G.Forst.

Type species
- Balanophora fungosa J.R.Forst. & G.Forst.

Species
- See text

Synonyms
- Acroblastum Sol. ex Setch.; Balaneikon Setch.; Balania Tiegh.; Balaniella Tiegh.; Bivolva Tiegh.; Cynopsole Endl.; Polyplethia (Griff.) Tiegh.

= Balanophora =

Genus of flowering plants

Balanophora is a genus of parasitic flowering plants in the family Balanophoraceae distributed from tropical Africa and Madagascar, through South and Southeast Asia, Japan, Queensland and the islands of the western Pacific. There are over 20 accepted species. Many species emit an odour which possibly attracts pollinators in the same way that pollinators are attracted to Rafflesia. The tiny flowers produce some of the smallest seeds known, weighing as little as 7 micrograms each.

== Taxonomy ==
The genus was first described in 1775 by Johann Reinhold Forster and his son Georg Forster in Characteres Generum Plantarum. The name is derived from the ancient Greek words balanos (βάλανος), meaning "acorn" and pherein (φέρειν), meaning "to carry".

=== Species ===
As of December 2025, Plants of the World Online accepts the following 26 species:

- Balanophora abbreviata Blume
- Balanophora aphylla Luu, H.Ð.Trần & H.C.Nguyen
- Balanophora appressa R.X.Yu & S.Y.Zhou
- Balanophora coralliformis Barcelona, Tandang & Pelser
- Balanophora cucphuongensis Bân
- Balanophora dioica R.Br. ex Royle
- Balanophora elongata Blume
- Balanophora fargesii (Tiegh.) Harms
- Balanophora flava (Hook.f.) Lidén
- Balanophora fungosa J.R.Forst. & G.Forst.
- Balanophora harlandii Hook.f.
- Balanophora involucrata Hook.f. & Thomson
- Balanophora japonica Makino
- Balanophora lalashanensis S.S.Ying
- Balanophora latisepala (Tiegh.) Lecomte
- Balanophora laxiflora Hemsl.
- Balanophora lowii Hook.f.
- Balanophora nipponica Makino
- Balanophora papuana Schltr.
- Balanophora parajaponica R.X.Yu, S.Y.Zhou & Y.Q.Li
- Balanophora polyandra Griff.
- Balanophora reflexa Becc.
- Balanophora subcupularis P.C.Tam
- Balanophora tobiracola Makino
- Balanophora wilderi Setch.
- Balanophora yakushimensis Hatus. & Masam.

In 2025, a new species was described from Tibet and named Balanophora xinfeniae.

== Ecology ==
Balanophora yuwanensis, often considered the same species as B. yakushimensis, is thought to provide the endangered dark-furred Amami rabbit (Pentalagus furnessi) of the Ryukyu Archipelago with vegetative tissues as a reward for seed dispersal. Previously, it had been a mystery how seeds of B. yuwanensis were dispersed.

== Use ==
Balanophora species are used in folk medicine in many Asian cultures. For example, in Taiwan and China, Balanophora is known as she-gu (snake-fungus) and in Thailand as hoh-ra-tao-su-nak. In both cases, the plant is used to treat a variety of ailments and has various ritual purposes. The tubers of Balanophora are rich in a wax-like substance which is used in Java as a fuel for torches.
