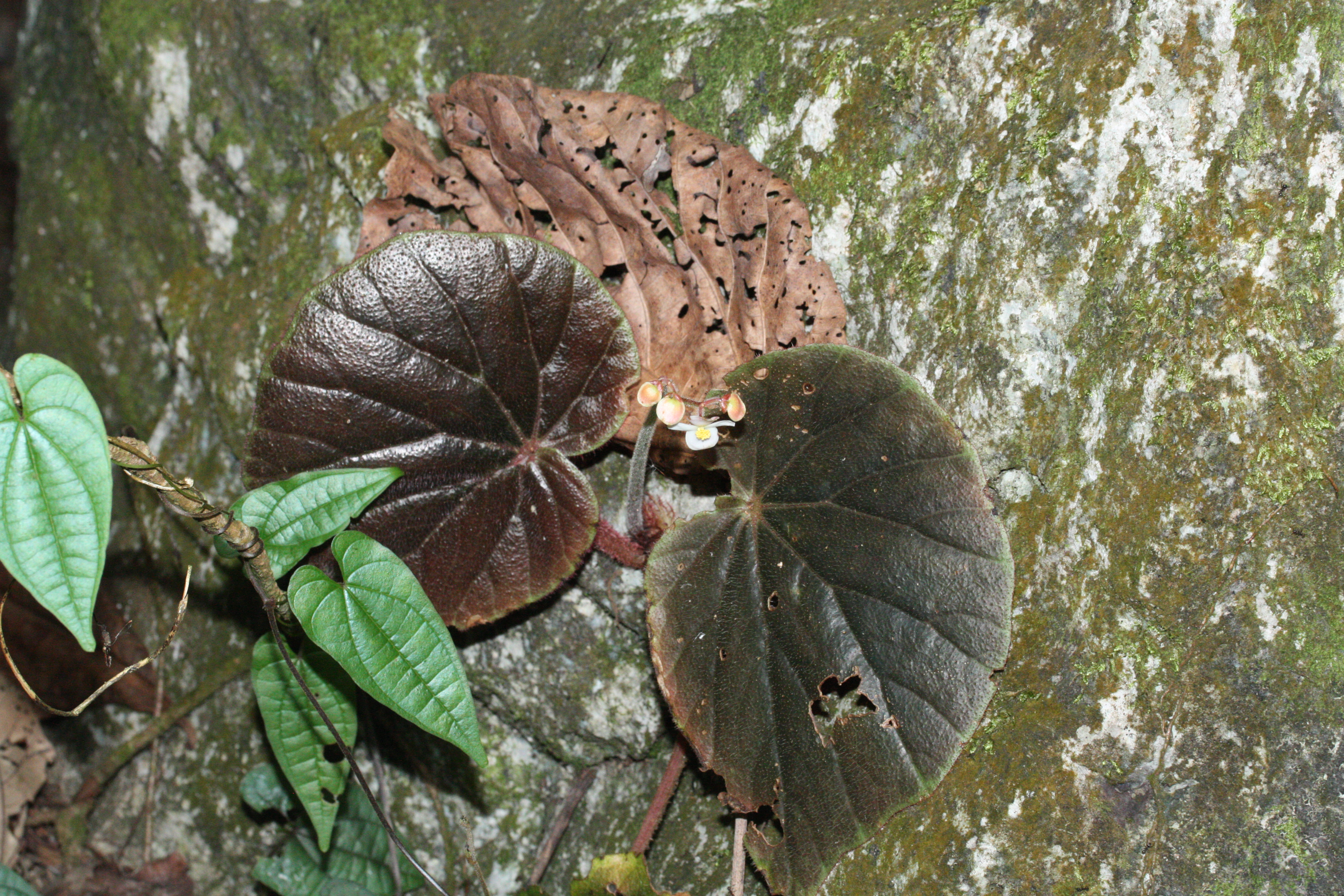
- Begonia caramoanensis

Scientific classification
- Kingdom: Plantae
- Clade: Tracheophytes
- Clade: Angiosperms
- Clade: Eudicots
- Clade: Rosids
- Order: Cucurbitales
- Family: Begoniaceae
- Genus: Begonia
- Species: B. caramoanensis

Binomial name
- Begonia caramoanensis Rubite, R.R., M. Irabagon, D. Palacio, Y.P.Ang, & R.Bustam.

= Begonia caramoanensis =

Species of flowering plant

Begonia caramoanensis is a species of flowering plant in the family Begoniaceae, native to the island of Luzon in the Philippines.

It was discovered in 2016 in Caramoan Peninsula by Filipino Botanist Botanist Rene Alfred Anton Bustamante. It was described in 2020 with the help from researchers from the Philippine Taxonomic Initiative (PTI) which was led by R.Bustam., Y.P.Ang, and R.R.Rubite. It resembles Begonia madulidii but is distinguished by the dark green almost orbicular leaves; extensive inflorescence branching five times; and the glandular trichomes of the bracts, peduncle, pedicels and ovary. More than 500 individuals, were observed in each of the four barangays of Caramoan, thus according to the IUCN red list categories and criteria, B. caramoanensis is hereby proposed to be placed under Least Concern (LC) category.

== Sources ==
- Publications
- Begoniaceae
- News
- Publications
