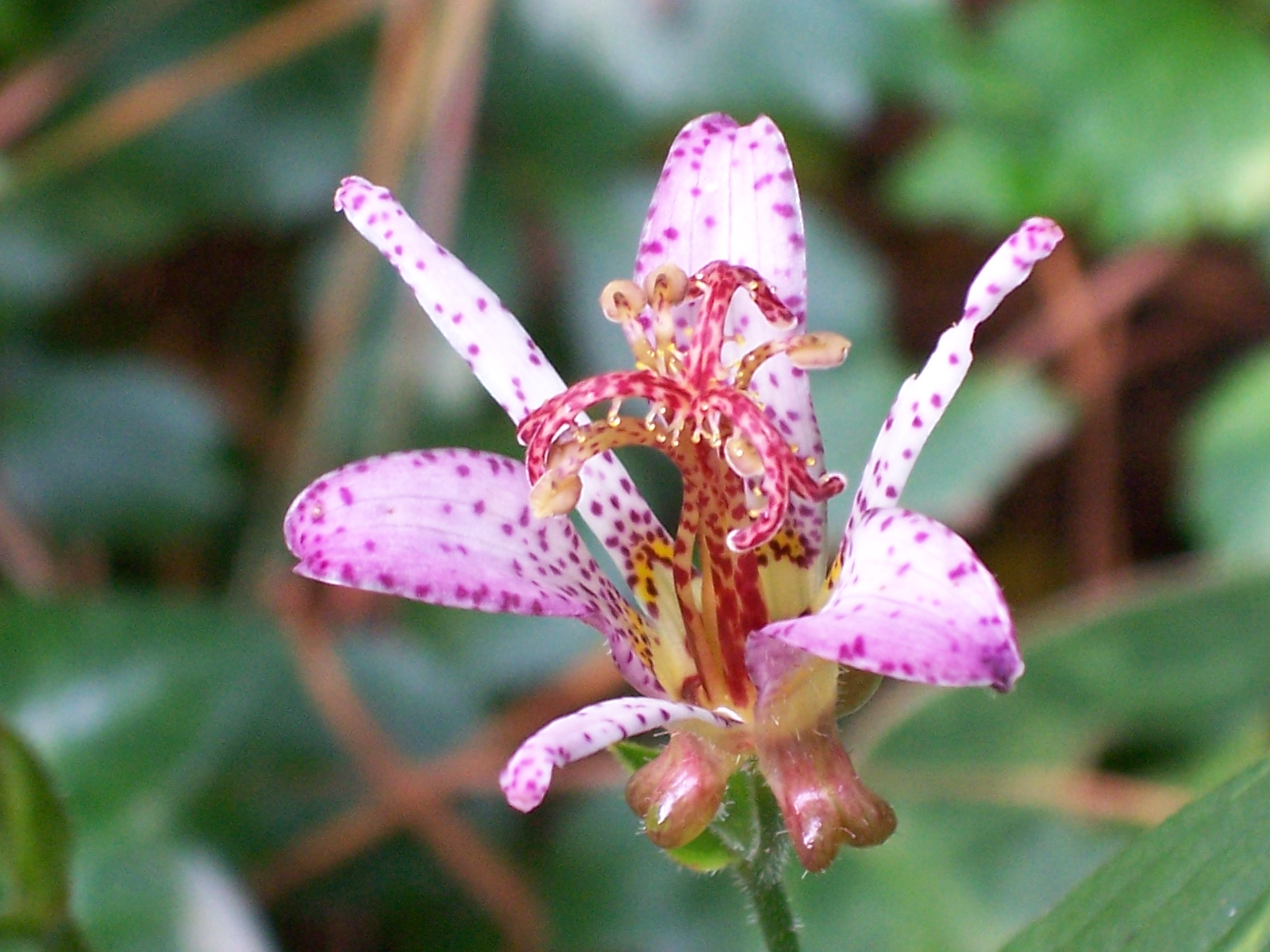

Scientific classification
- Kingdom: Plantae
- Clade: Tracheophytes
- Clade: Angiosperms
- Clade: Monocots
- Order: Liliales
- Family: Liliaceae
- Genus: Tricyrtis
- Species: T. stolonifera

Binomial name
- Tricyrtis stolonifera Matsum.

= Tricyrtis stolonifera =

Species of flowering plant

Tricyrtis stolonifera (toad lily) is a hardy perennial plant in the family Liliaceae that is native to Taiwan, typically growing in thickets and roadsides. The flowers have light purple tepals with purple spots, sometimes with whitish yellow at the base, blooming June-July.

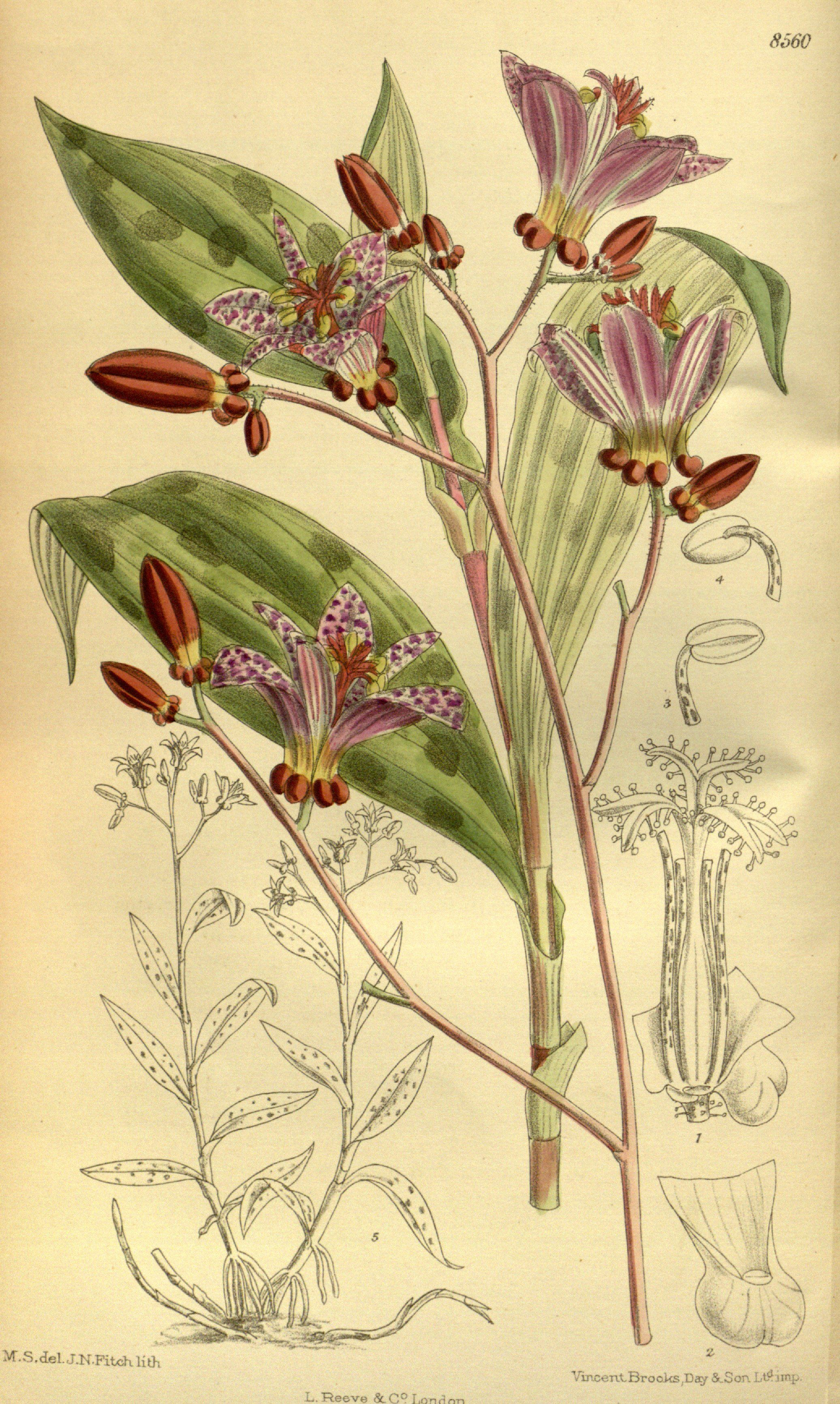
Tricyrtis stolonifera in Curtis's Botanical Magazine, London, 1914.
