= Nojigiku Sho =

Japanese thoroughbred race

- Location: Sonoda Racecourse
- Inaugurated: 1963
- Race type: Thoroughbred - Flat racing

Race information
- Distance: 1,700 meters
- Surface: Dirt
- Qualification: Three-year-old mares
- Weight: 54kg
- Purse: 1st: ¥5,000,000

The Nojigiku Sho (in Japanese: のじぎく賞), is a race for three-year-old mares from Japan's Tokai region in the Aichi Prefectural Horse Racing Association.

== Race details ==
The race was established in 1963. It is held at Sonoda Racecourse on a 1,700 meter track.

The award is named after a Japanese flower, the Chrysanthemum japonense.

== Winners since 2015 ==
Winners since 2015 include:

Year	Winner	Jockey	Trainer	Time
2015	Toko Venus	Manabu Tanaka	Tatsuho Yoshiyuki	1:49.2
2016	Dear Maruko	Hideya Sahara	Tetsuya Naka	1:51.7
2017	Apelila Ruby	Maki Mukaiyama	Yoichi Kurimoto	1:51.1
2018	Tulipa	Tomohiro Yoshimura	Tokuhiko Hiramatsu	1:54.8
2019	Chervil	Takashi Nakata	Shinobu Noda	1:51.9

== Past winners ==
Past winners include:

- 1973: O.N. Karim
- 1974: Elizabeth Quinn
- 1975: Ali Seiyu
- 1976: Otowahime
- 1977: Senju Eiza
- 1978: Arab Hime
- 1979: Sankyo Homare
- 1980: Hillary Nisei
- 1981: Tokino Shigemi
- 1982: Saruta Homare
- 1983: Satsuki Top Lady
- 1984: Mar Zenjuan
- 1985: Great Queen
- 1986: Tokino Karen
- 1987: Center Pure
- 1988: San Omier
- 1989: Sumano Ershi
- 1990: Quinn In Beta
- 1991: Kyowa Idol
- 1992: Rokko Best
- 1993: Keshigo Manna
- 1994: Kaori Bijin
- 1995: Fate Star
- 1996: Rosen Pearl
- 1997: Makio Queen
- 1998: Ebishiro Queen
- 1999: Orion The Dancer
- 2000: Bakushin Creel
- 2001: Hirakatsu Asuka
- 2002: Queen Cast
- 2003: June Paradis
- 2004: Kinugasa Sapphire
- 2005: Mayano Powerful
- 2006: Nice Joker
- 2007: Enta no Megami
- 2008: Iron Gold
- 2009: Virgin Sapphire
- 2010: Helena
- 2011: Mambo Bean
- 2012: Mermaid Jump
- 2013: Yumeno Atosaki
- 2014: Toko Nile

== See also ==
- Horse racing in Japan
- List of Japanese flat horse races
