= Coral plant =

Coral plant is a common name for several flowering plants and may refer to:

- Balanophora coralliformis in the family Balanophoraceae
- Berberidopsis corallina in the family Berberidopsidaceae
- Jatropha multifida, a species of Jatropha in the spurge family, Euphorbiaceae
- Russelia equisetiformis in the plantain family, Plantaginaceae
