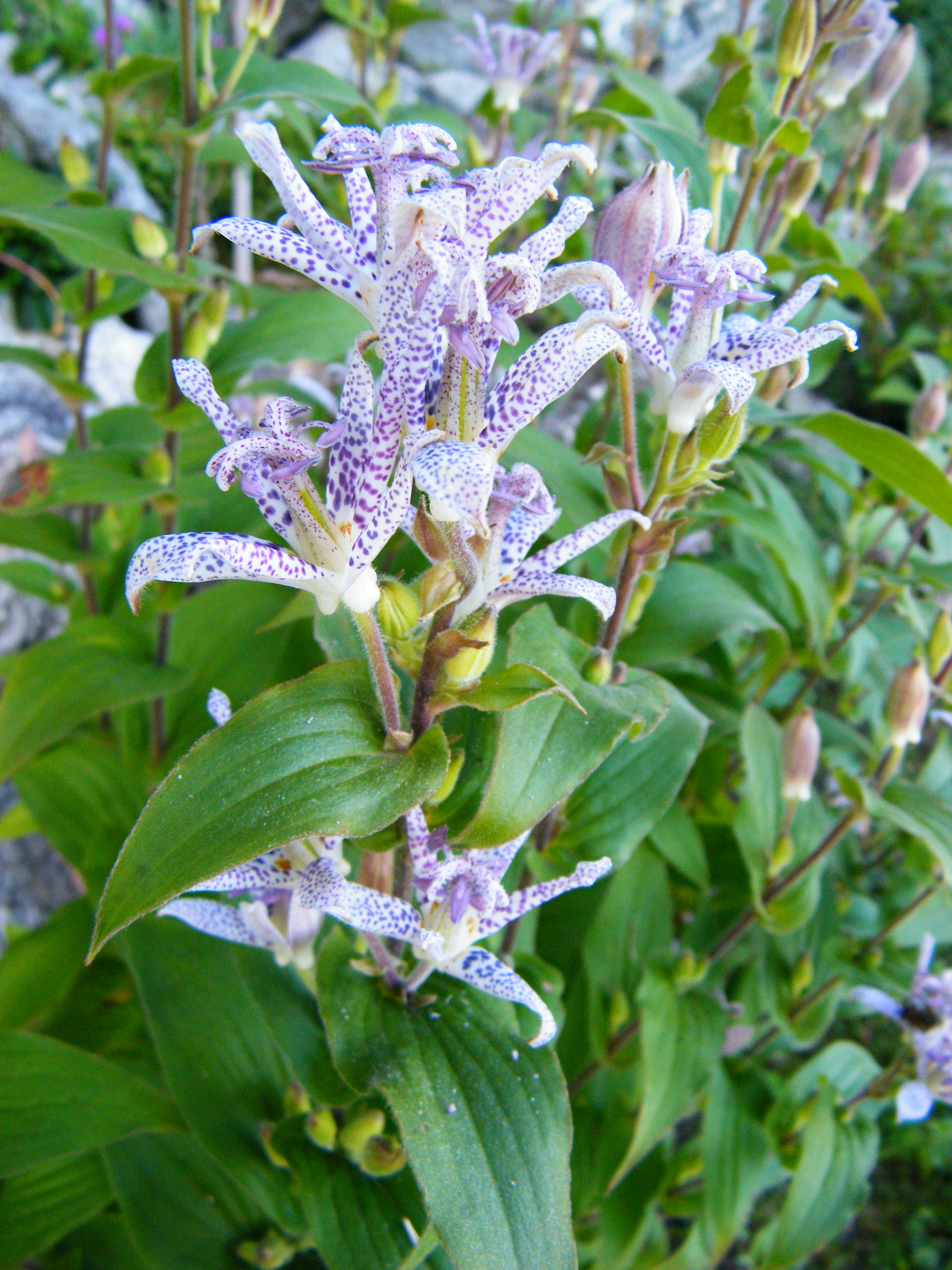

Scientific classification
- Kingdom: Plantae
- Clade: Tracheophytes
- Clade: Angiosperms
- Clade: Monocots
- Order: Liliales
- Family: Liliaceae
- Genus: Tricyrtis
- Species: T. hirta

Binomial name
- Tricyrtis hirta (Thunb.) Hook.

Synonyms
- Uvularia hirta Thunb.; Compsoa hirta (Thunb.) Kuntze; Tricyrtis japonica Miq.; Tricyrtis clinata J.F.Macbr.

= Tricyrtis hirta =

Species of plant

Tricyrtis hirta (ほととぎすそう, Hototogisu-sou), the toad lily or hairy toad lily, is a Japanese species of hardy herbaceous perennial plant in the lily family Liliaceae.

It is found growing on shaded rocky cliffs and stream banks in central and southern Japan. Leaves are large and wide, clasping around the stem. The flowers are whitish to pale purple with dark purple spots.

Varieties

- Tricyrtis hirta var. hirta - central and southern Japan
- Tricyrtis hirta var. masamunei (Makino) Masam - Kyushu
Tricyrtis hirta 'Pink Freckles'

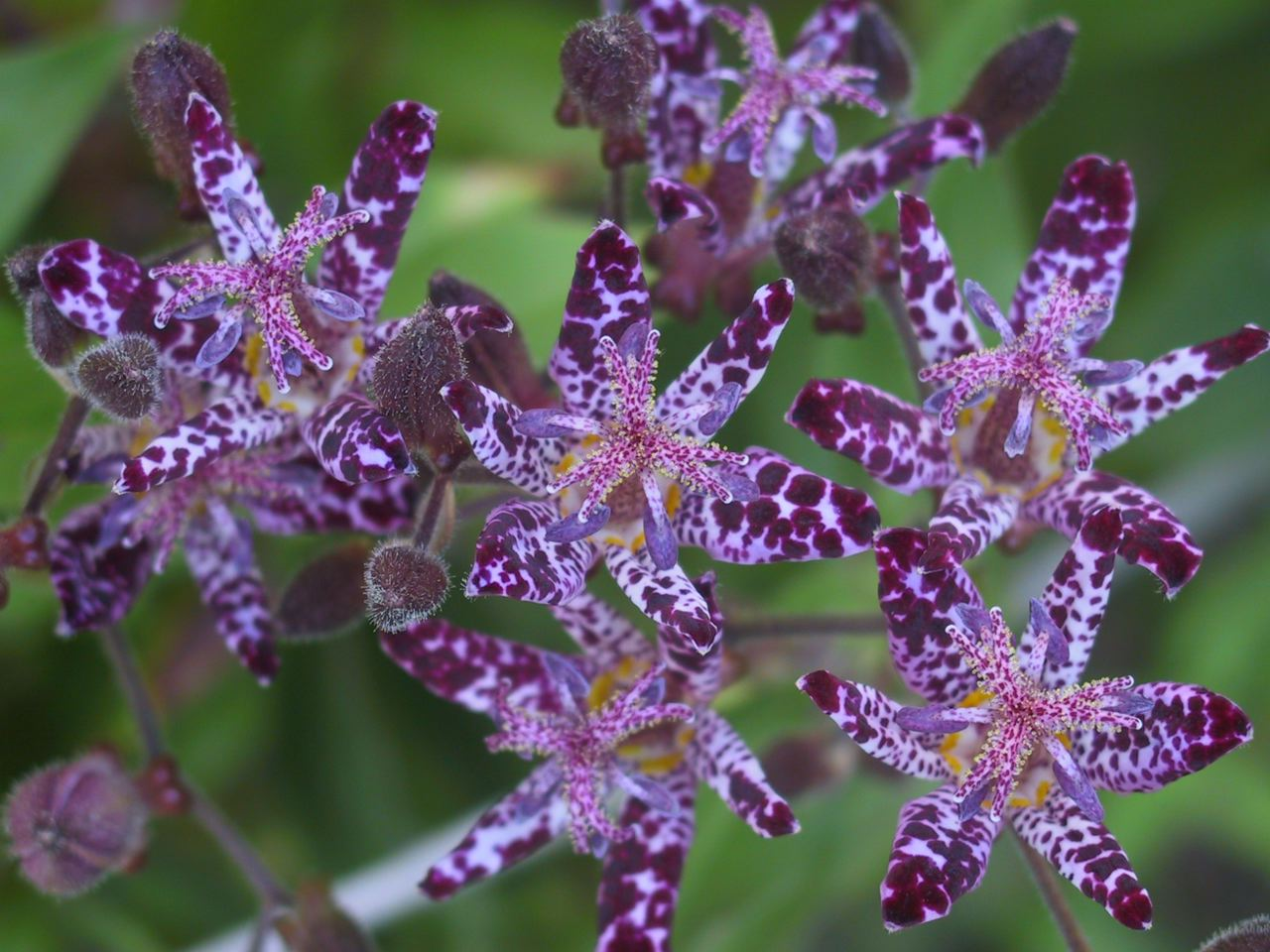
Tricyrtis hirta

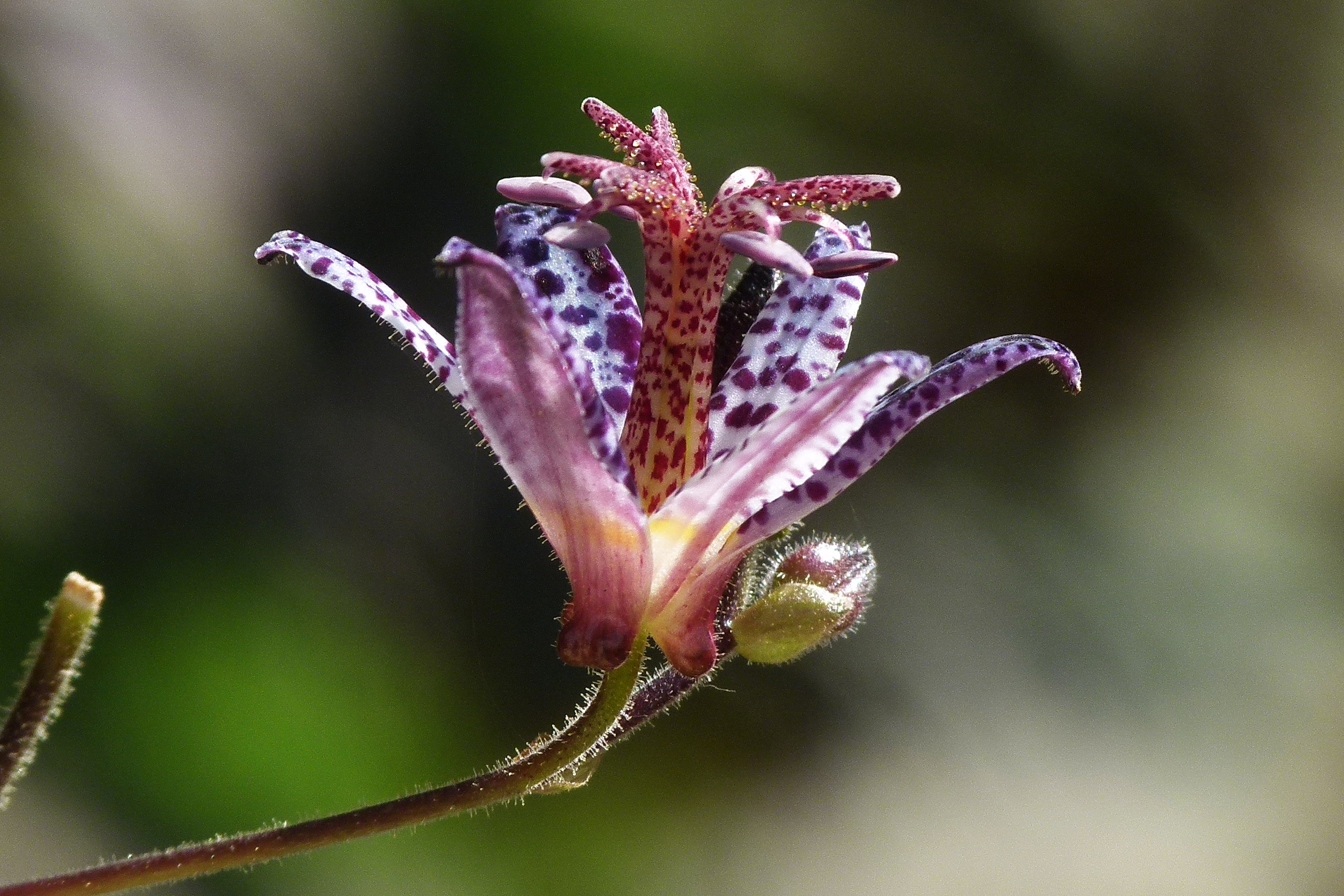

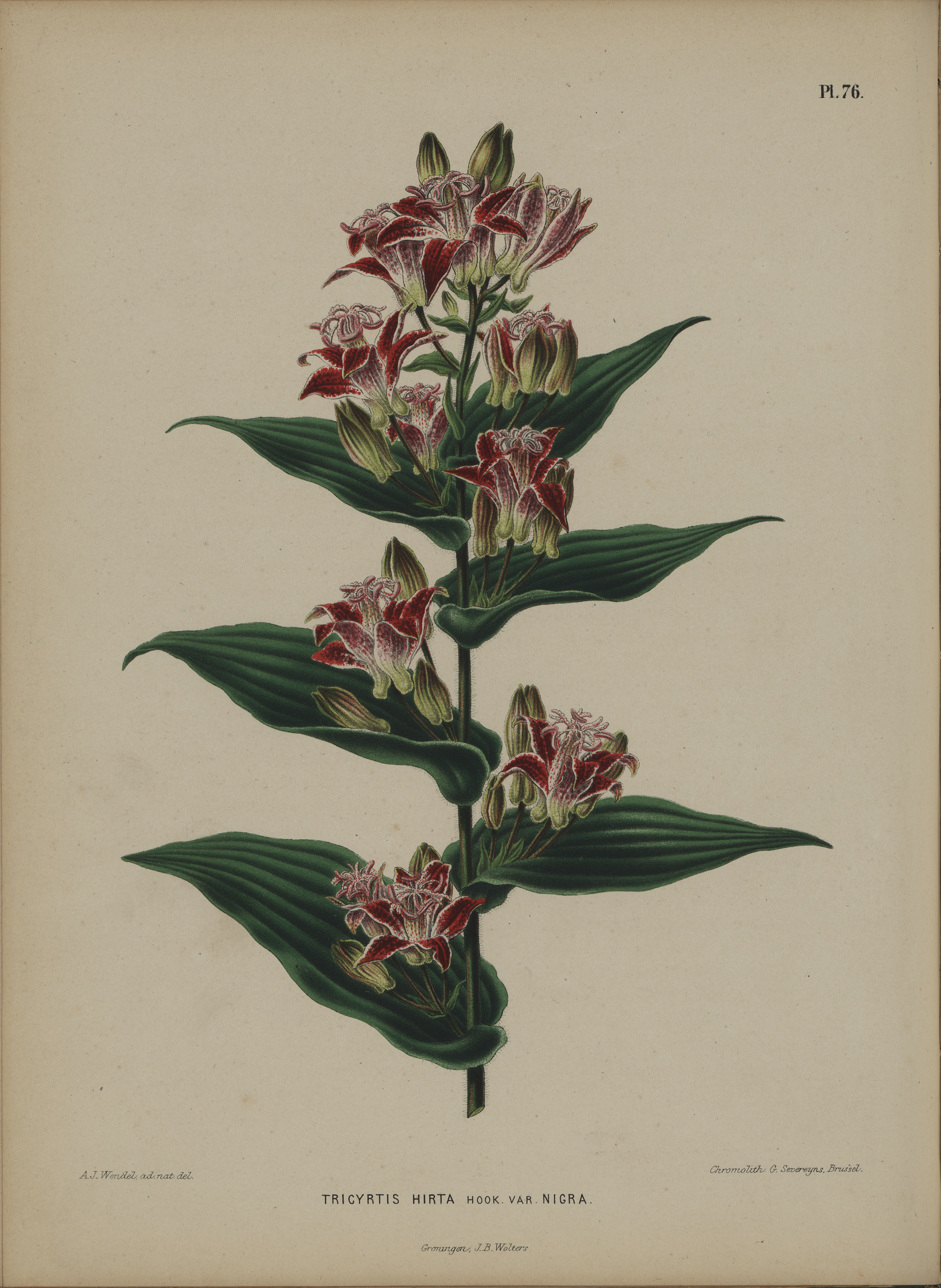
Tricyrtis hirta by Abraham Jacobus Wendel, 1868
