= Tricyrtis puberula =

Scientific classification
- Kingdom: Plantae
- Clade: Tracheophytes
- Clade: Angiosperms
- Clade: Monocots
- Order: Liliales
- Family: Liliaceae
- Genus: Tricyrtis
- Species: T. puberula

Binomial name
- Tricyrtis puberula Nakai & Kitag.

Synonyms
- Tricyrtis pseudolatifolia Hir. Takah.bis & H.Koyama

Species of flowering plant

Tricyrtis puberula is a Chinese species of plants in the lily family. It is found in the Provinces of Hebei, Henan, Hubei, Shaanxi, and Sichuan.

As recognized by the World Checklist maintained by Kew Botanic Garden in London, T. latifolia is found only in Japan. Some authors maintain the some Chinese material also belongs to this species, but the World Checklist regards the Chinese populations as a distinct species, Tricyrtis puberula|T. puberula. Further investigation seems warranted.
