= Sonoda Racecourse =

Racecourse in Hyōgo Prefecture, Japan

Sonoda Racecourse 園田競馬場
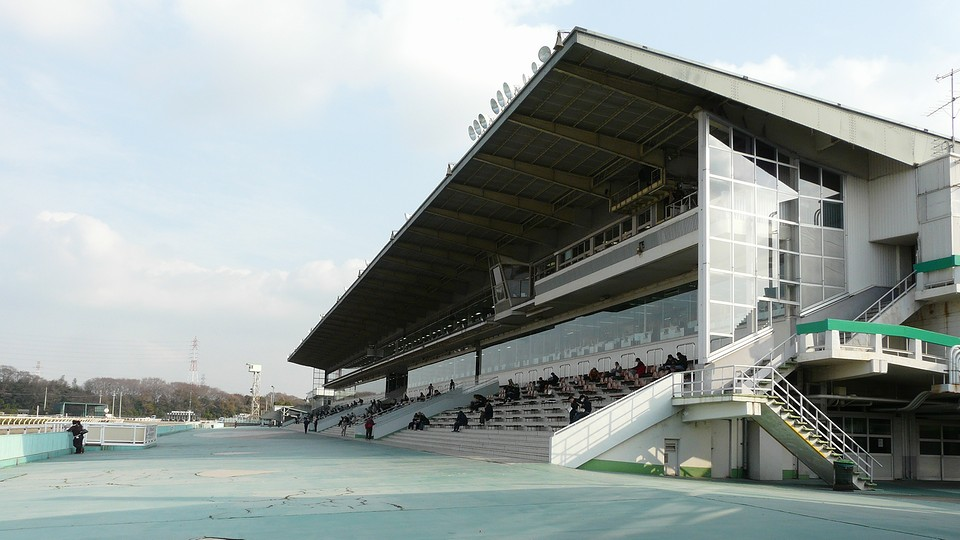
- Interactive map of Sonoda Racecourse 園田競馬場
- Location: 2-1-1 Tano, Amagasaki-shi, Hyogo 661-0951 Japan
- Coordinates: 34.7667°N 135.4452°E
- Owned by: Hyogo Horse Racing Association
- Date opened: December 15, 1930
- Race type: Flat
- Course type: Dirt
- Notable races: Nojigiku Sho

Sonoda Racecourse (園田競馬場) is a horseracing venue located in Hyōgo Prefecture, Japan.

== Physical attributes ==
Sonoda Racecourse is a 1,051-meter long dirt track. It is a right-handed (clockwise) course.

The track holds 17,400 people and has a ¥100 entrance fee.

== Notable races ==
Month	Race	Distance	Age/Sex
JPN Unlisted
April	Kikusui Sho	Dirt 1700m	3yo in Hyogo
May	Nojigiku Sho	Dirt 1700m	3yo
