= Balanophora cucphuongensis =

Conservation status
- Endangered (IUCN 3.1)

Scientific classification
- Kingdom: Plantae
- Clade: Tracheophytes
- Clade: Angiosperms
- Clade: Eudicots
- Order: Santalales
- Family: Balanophoraceae
- Genus: Balanophora
- Species: B. cucphuongensis

Binomial name
- Balanophora cucphuongensis Ban

Species of flowering plant

Balanophora cucphuongensis is a species of plant in the Balanophoraceae family. It is found in Cúc Phương National Park and Kon Tum Province, Vietnam. Local people use this plant as a medical treatment for erectile dysfunction and enhancement of libido.
