= Begonia cabanillasii =

Scientific classification
- Kingdom: Plantae
- Clade: Tracheophytes
- Clade: Angiosperms
- Clade: Eudicots
- Clade: Rosids
- Order: Cucurbitales
- Family: Begoniaceae
- Genus: Begonia
- Species: B. cabanillasii

Binomial name
- Begonia cabanillasii Y.P.Ang, Tandang, Agcaoili & R.Bustam.

Species of flowering plant

Begonia cabanillasii is a species of flowering plant in the family Begoniaceae, native to the island of Palawan in the Philippines.

It was discovered in 2017 in El Nido, by a group of conservationists led by Filipino Botanist Rene Bustamante in Palawan. It is distinct from other Begonia species “distinct hair”, thickness of leaf, and “compact” habitat. Its staminate flower pedicel ranges from 15 to 25 millimeters, with four white and pink petals.

Begonia cabanillasii was described in 2020 with the help from researchers from the Philippine Taxonomic Initiative (PTI), The research was led by Yu Pin Ang, John Micheal Agcaoilli and Rene Bustamante. It is the 23rd Begonia species described which is endemic in Palawan.
