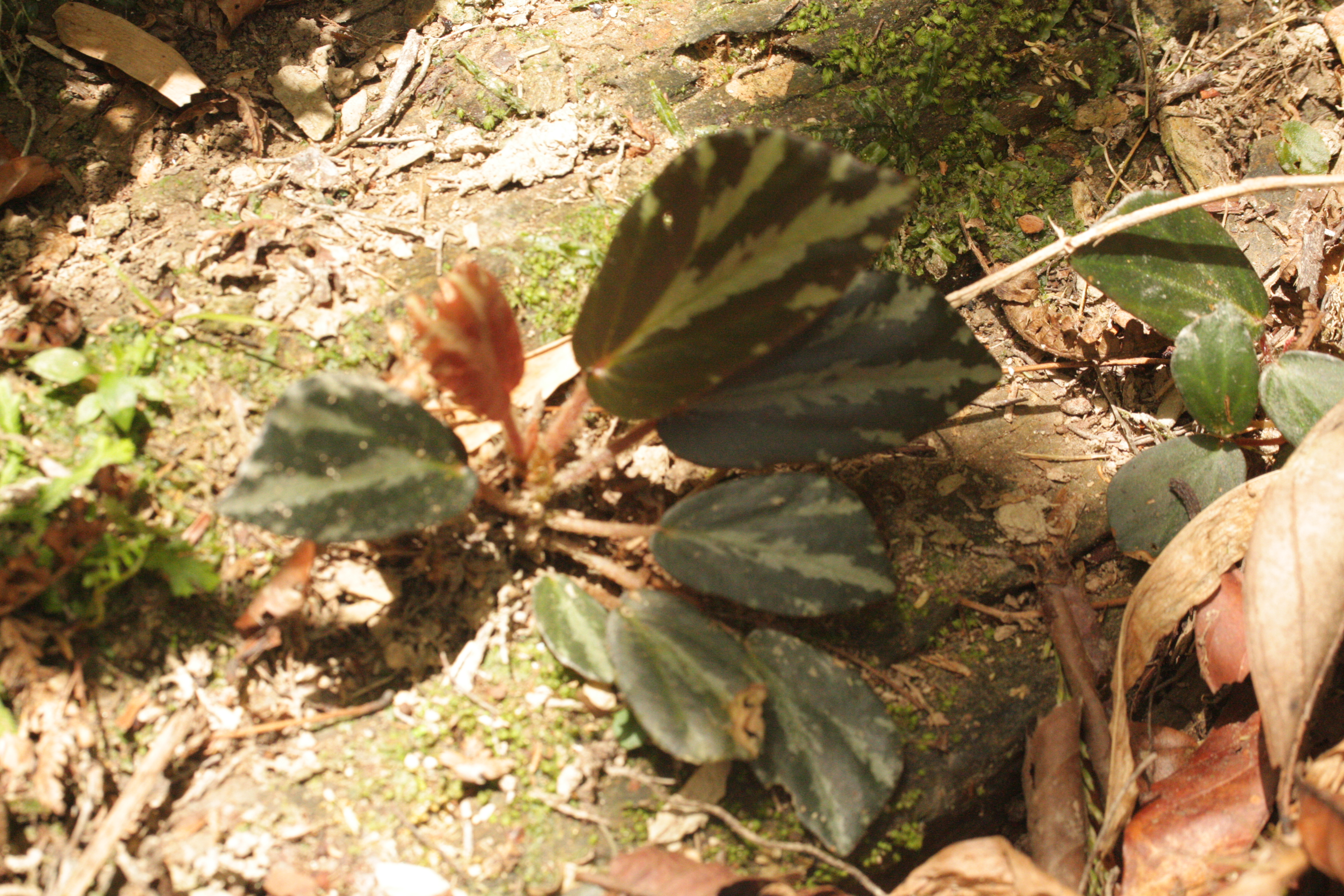

Scientific classification
- Kingdom: Plantae
- Clade: Tracheophytes
- Clade: Angiosperms
- Clade: Eudicots
- Clade: Rosids
- Order: Cucurbitales
- Family: Begoniaceae
- Genus: Begonia
- Species: B. truncatifolia

Binomial name
- Begonia truncatifolia R.Bustam., Tandang M., Pranada & Y.P. Ang

= Begonia truncatifolia =

Species of flowering plant

Begonia truncatifolia is a species of flowering plant in the family Begoniaceae, native to the island of Palawan in the Philippines.

It was discovered in 2011 in San Vicente, Palawan by Filipino Botanist Botanist Rene Alfred Anton Bustamante. It was described in 2020 with the help from researchers from the Philippine Taxonomic Initiative (PTI) which was led by R.Bustam., Andrew Pranada, Yu Pin Ang, and Danilo Tandang. It resembles Begonia blancii but is distinguished by a high degree of variegation on their leaves, varying from brown mottled patches to white/silvery streaks. Endangered due to the decline to its population since its first documentation. Possible cause mentioned are illegal logging, slash and burn farming and construction of a resort on the river as some of the causes., thus according to the IUCN red list categories and criteria, B. truncatifolia is hereby proposed to be placed under endangered (E) category.

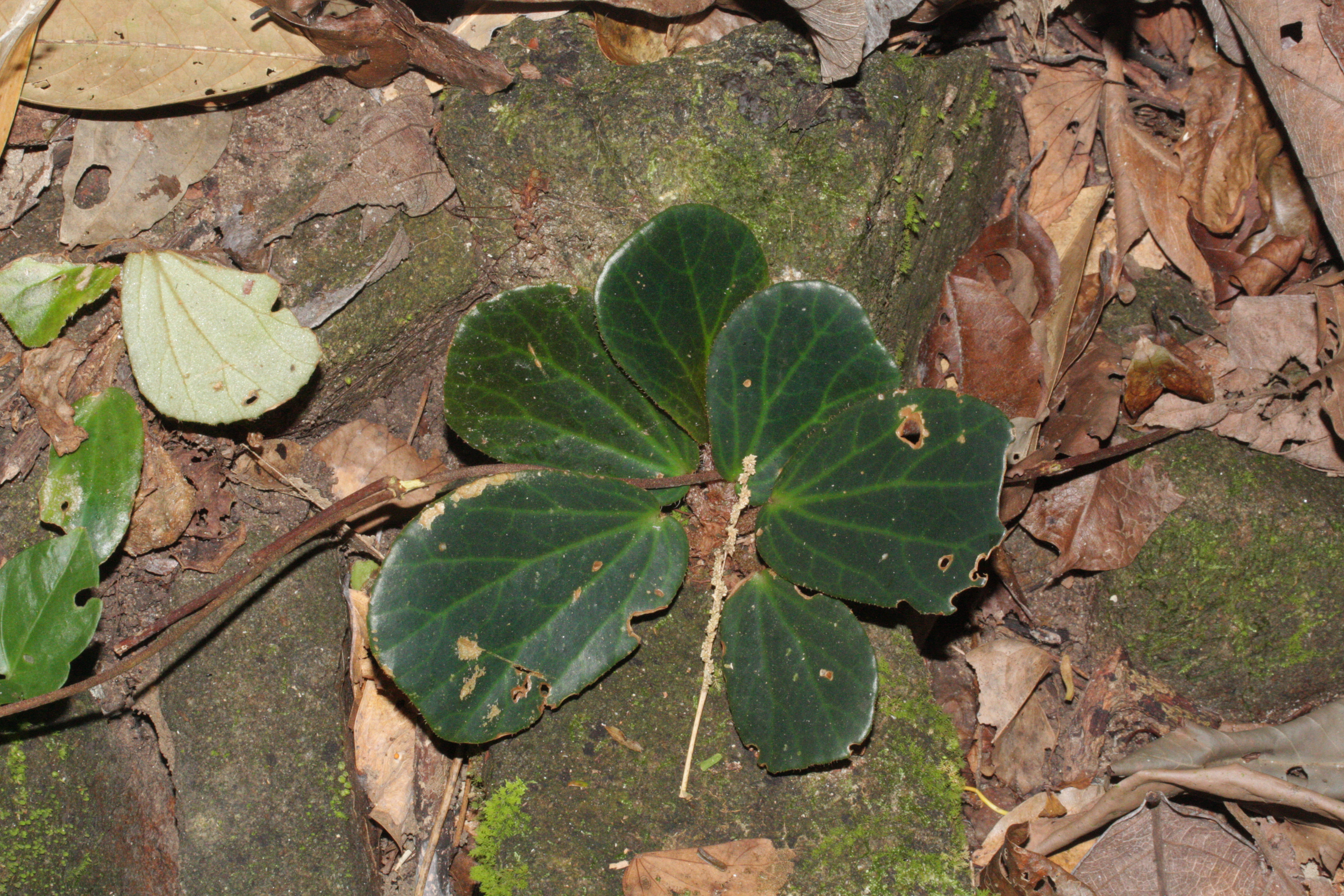
Begonia blancii, the most similar known species
