= Corybas circinatus =

Scientific classification
- Kingdom: Plantae
- Clade: Tracheophytes
- Clade: Angiosperms
- Clade: Monocots
- Order: Asparagales
- Family: Orchidaceae
- Subfamily: Orchidoideae
- Tribe: Diurideae
- Genus: Corybas
- Species: C. circinatus

Binomial name
- Corybas circinatus D.N.Tandang & R.Bustam.

Species of flowering plant

Corybas circinatus is a species of flowering plant from the family Orchidaceae endemic to ultramafic habitats on the island of Palawan, Philippines, The endemic helmet orchid was first photographed at Mount Victoria in June 2007. This species is distinct in bearing a small glandular protuberance at the front of its pedicel, a 4-lobed entire labellum, and a distinctive strongly incurved dorsal sepal. The general colouration of the floral and vegetative parts is also highly characteristic, and the general lowland to mid-montane ecology of the species is unique amongst the known Philippines Corybas. The research was initiated by the Philippine Taxonomic Initiative, Inc.

Corybas circinatus is the second of its species found on the island province of Palawan.
