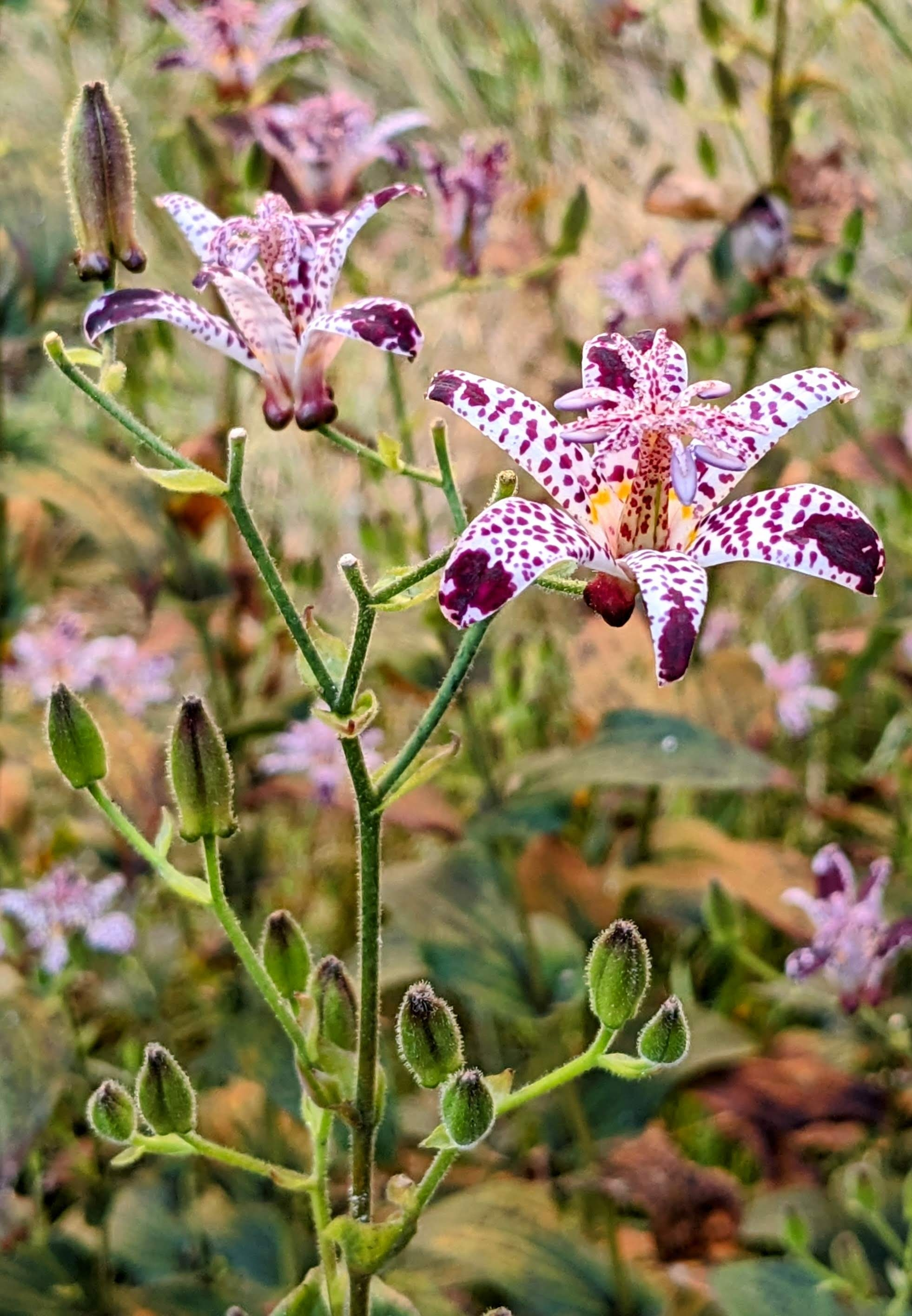

Scientific classification
- Kingdom: Plantae
- Clade: Tracheophytes
- Clade: Angiosperms
- Clade: Monocots
- Order: Liliales
- Family: Liliaceae
- Genus: Tricyrtis
- Species: T. formosana

Binomial name
- Tricyrtis formosana Baker

Synonyms
- Compsoa formosana (Baker) Kuntze

= Tricyrtis formosana =

Species of flowering plant

Tricyrtis formosana, the toad lily, is an East Asian species of herbaceous plant in the lily family. It is native to Taiwan and to Nansei-shoto (also known as the Ryukyu Islands, part of Japan).

The Latin specific epithet formosana refers to the former name of Taiwan, Formosa.

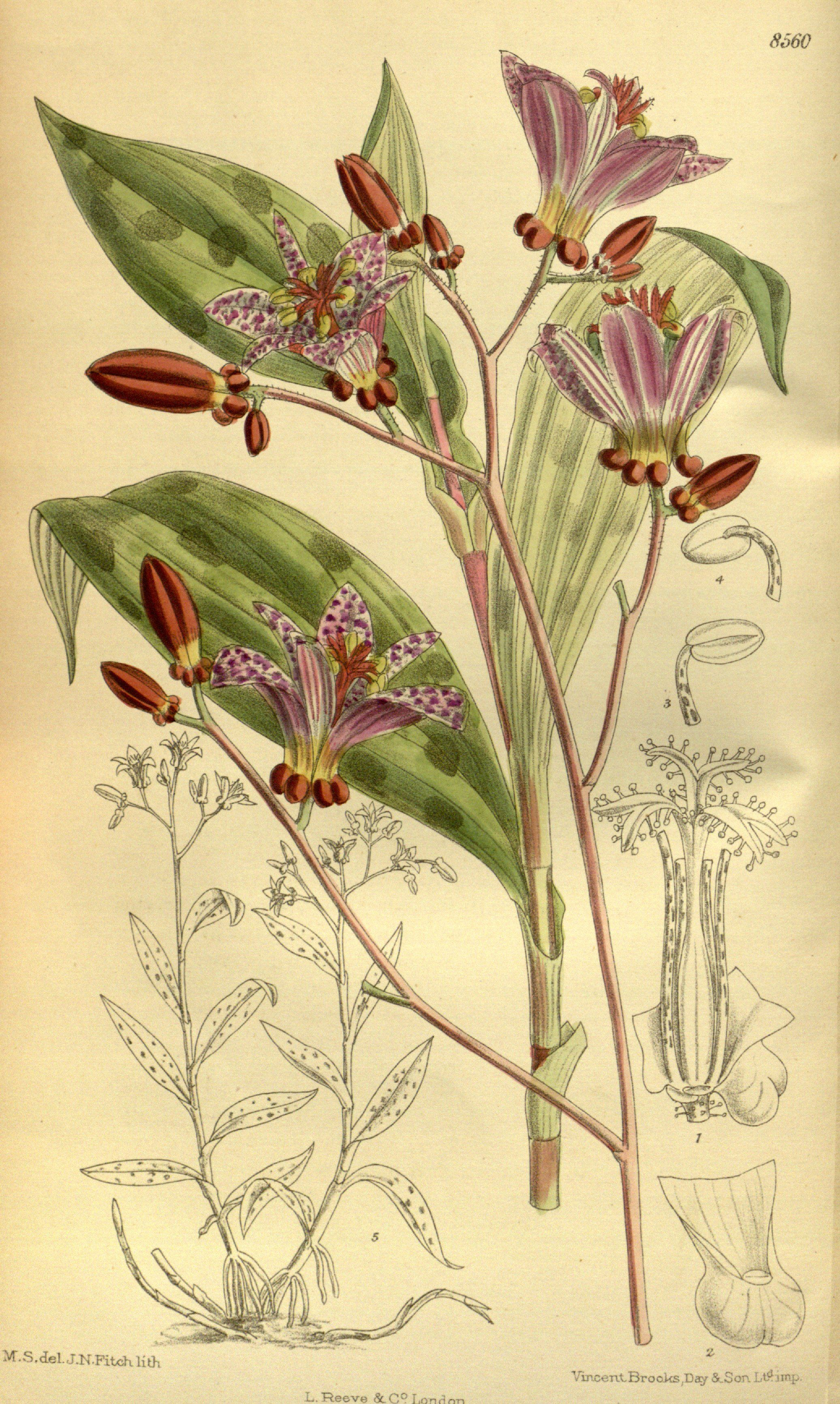
1914 illustration

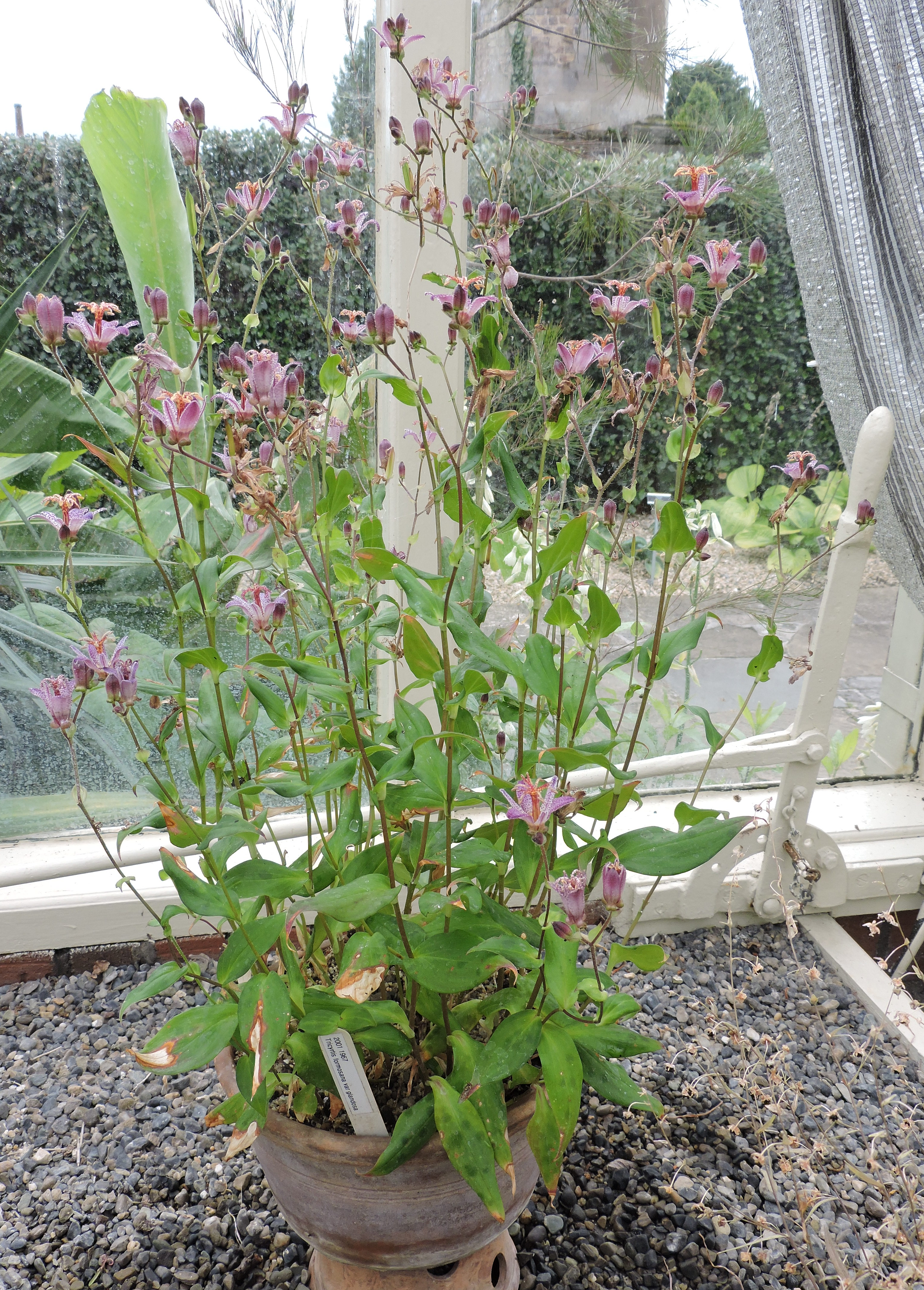
Tricyrtis formosana - National Botanic Gardens (Ireland)

== Description ==
Tricyrtis formosana is a rhizomatous herbaceous perennial up to 80 cm (31 in) tall, sometimes branching but sometimes not. The flowers are trumpet-shaped, white or light purple with prominent darker purple spots.

Varieties

- Tricyrtis formosana var. formosana - Taiwan, Iriomote
- Tricyrtis formosana var. glandosa (T.Shimizu) T.S.Liu & S.S.Ying - Taiwan
