= Kikusui Sho =

Japanese thoroughbred race

- Location: Sonoda Racecourse
- Inaugurated: 1999
- Race type: Thoroughbred - Flat racing

Race information
- Distance: 1,700 meters
- Surface: Dirt
- Qualification: Three-year-olds in Hyogo
- Weight: 54kg-56kg
- Purse: 1st: ¥7,000,000

The Kikusui Sho (in Japanese: 菊水賞) is a race for three-year-old stallions from Hyōgo Prefecture in the Hyogo Horse Racing Association.

== Race details ==
The race is run over 1,700 meters at Sonoda Racecourse on a dirt track.

The race is the first leg of the Hyogo Prefecture Triple Crown, alongside the Hyogo Derby and the Hyogo Championship.

The race usually takes place in April.

== Winners since 2015 ==
Winners since 2015 include:

| Year | Winner | Jockey | Trainer | Time |
|---|---|---|---|---|
| 2015 | Indium | Ken Kimura | Norio Tanaka | 1:53.3 |
| 2016 | Chouette | Tomohiro Hamada | Masako Niiko | 1:49.1 |
| 2017 | Magic Carpet | Ken Kimura | Norio Tanaka | 1:53.8 |
| 2018 | Azeztulite | Shoichi Kawamura | Yoshinori Arayama | 1:54.1 |
| 2019 | Jingi | Manabu Tanaka | Tadaaki Hashimoto | 1:49.1 |

== Past winners ==
Past winners include:

- 2000: Macky Laurel
- 2001: Road Bakushin
- 2002: Setono Ultra
- 2003: Meiner Exon
- 2004: Rugger Hitoritabi
- 2005: Great Stage
- 2006: Chance Torai
- 2007: Yukino Arashi
- 2008: Dear Sparkle
- 2009: Karate Chop
- 2010: Fiore Harbor
- 2011: Hokusetsu Sunday
- 2012: Poison Black
- 2013: Yumeno Atosaki
- 2014: Nihonkai Seira

== See also ==
- Horse racing in Japan
- List of Japanese flat horse races
