= Balanophotannin D =

Names
- IUPAC name [(2R,3S,4S,5R,6S)-6-[(E)-3-(3,4-dihydroxyphenyl)prop-2-enoyl]oxy-3,4,5-trihydroxyoxan-2-yl]methyl (1S)-7,8,9-trihydroxy-3,5-dioxo-1,2-dihydrocyclopenta[c]isochromene-1-carboxylate

Identifiers
3D model (JSmol)	Interactive image
ChEMBL	ChEMBL506571
ChemSpider	23340737
PubChem CID	24862008
CompTox Dashboard (EPA)	DTXSID201030351
- InChI: InChI=1S/C28H24O16/c29-12-3-1-9(5-13(12)30)2-4-17(33)43-28-24(38)23(37)21(35)16(42-28)8-41-26(39)11-7-15(32)25-19(11)18-10(27(40)44-25)6-14(31)20(34)22(18)36/h1-6,11,16,21,23-24,28-31,34-38H,7-8H2/b4-2+/t11-,16+,21+,23-,24+,28-/m0/s1 Key: URJGURKNABRVCH-ATYMIDRYSA-N; InChI=1/C28H24O16/c29-12-3-1-9(5-13(12)30)2-4-17(33)43-28-24(38)23(37)21(35)16(42-28)8-41-26(39)11-7-15(32)25-19(11)18-10(27(40)44-25)6-14(31)20(34)22(18)36/h1-6,11,16,21,23-24,28-31,34-38H,7-8H2/b4-2+/t11-,16+,21+,23-,24+,28-/m0/s1 Key: URJGURKNABRVCH-ATYMIDRYBR
- SMILES: C1[C@@H](C2=C(C1=O)OC(=O)C3=CC(=C(C(=C32)O)O)O)C(=O)OC[C@@H]4[C@H]([C@@H]([C@H]([C@@H](O4)OC(=O)/C=C/C5=CC(=C(C=C5)O)O)O)O)O

Properties
Chemical formula	C_{28}H_{24}O_{16}
Molar mass	616.484 g·mol^{−1}
- Except where otherwise noted, data are given for materials in their standard state (at 25 °C [77 °F], 100 kPa). Infobox references

Balanophotannin D is a hydrolyzable tannin found in Balanophora japonica. It contains an oxidized hexahydroxydiphenoyl (HHDP) group.
