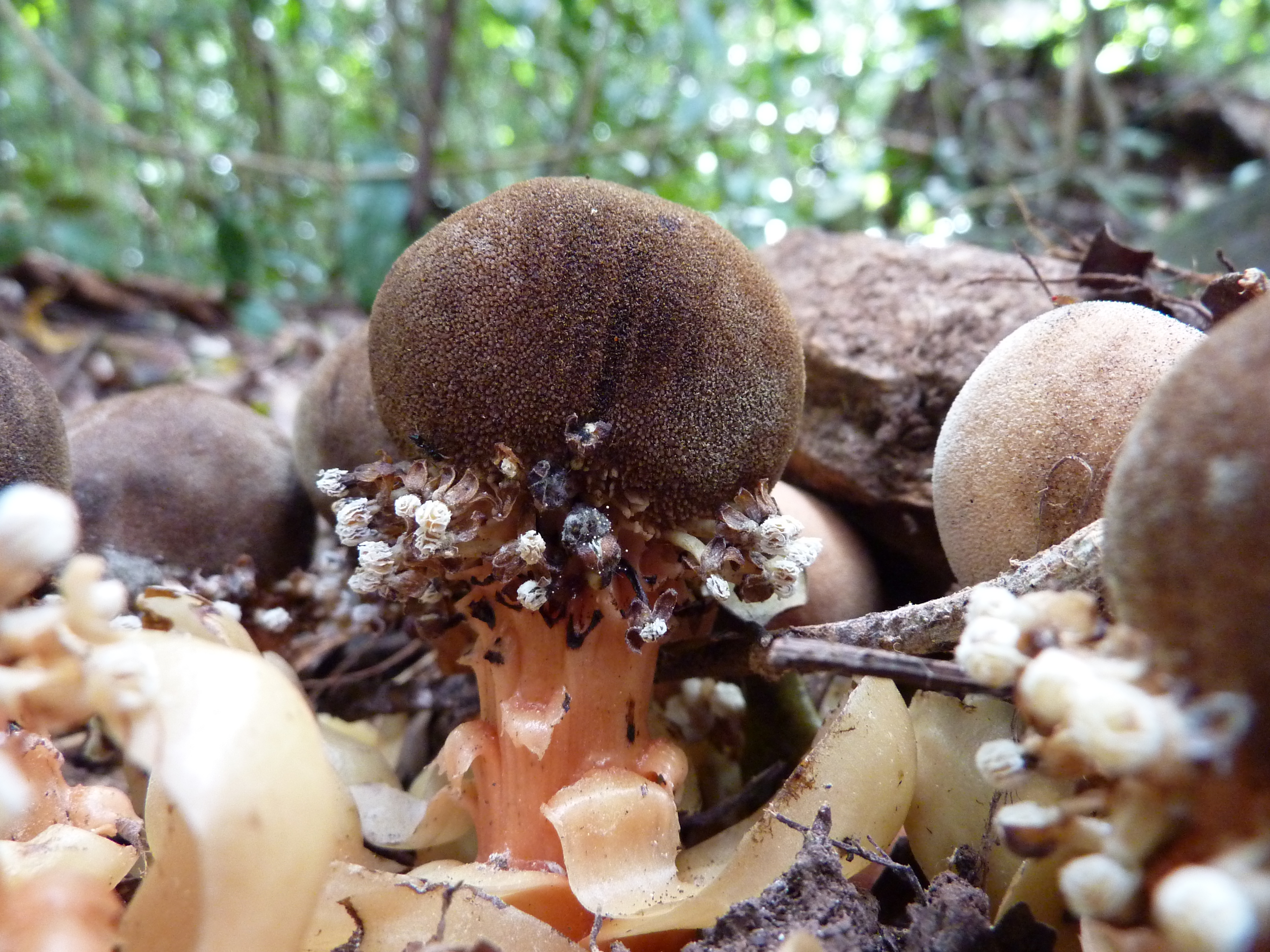
- B. fungosa growing in rainforest near Kuranda in Queensland.

Scientific classification
- Kingdom: Plantae
- Clade: Embryophytes
- Clade: Tracheophytes
- Clade: Angiosperms
- Clade: Eudicots
- Order: Santalales
- Family: Balanophoraceae
- Genus: Balanophora
- Species: B. fungosa

Binomial name
- Balanophora fungosa J.R.Forst. & G.Forst.

= Balanophora fungosa =

Species of plant in the family Balanophoraceae

Balanophora fungosa, sometimes known as fungus root, is a flowering plant in the family Balanophoraceae and occurs in South Asia, Southeast Asia, Australia and some Pacific islands. It is a parasite growing on the roots of rainforest trees. The flowering structure is shaped like a puffball but in fact consists of a globe covered with thousands of tiny female flowers. The globe is surrounded at its base by a much smaller number of male flowers. In flower, the plant emits an odour resembling that of mice.

== Description ==
Like other members of its genus, B. fungosa is holoparasitic and contains no chlorophyll. The aerial parts of the plant consist of a hard, irregularly shaped tuber from which the flower-bearing structures extend. The leaves are scale-like, pale cream in colour, 8–30 millimetres (0.3–1 in) long, 7–20 millimetres (0.3–0.8 in) wide and more or less stem clasping.

The plant is monoecious or dioecious. When monoecious, it bears both pistillate (female) and staminate (male) flowers. Thousands of minute female flowers cover a globe-shaped structure 15–20 millimetres (0.6–0.8 in) in diameter. The styles are less than 1 millimetre (0.04 in) long. About 20 male flowers are arranged around the base of the globe, each about 3–5 millimetres (0.1–0.2 in) in diameter with a pedicel about 5–6 millimetres (0.20–0.24 in) long and are covered with powdery white pollen.

== Taxonomy and naming ==
Balanophora fungosa was described by Johann Reinhold Forster and Georg Forster in 1774 and the description was published in Characteres Generum Plantarum. The species epithet fungosa is the adjectival form of the Latin word fungosus meaning "fungus-like", which refers to the plant's superficial resemblance to a mushroom.

The names of two subspecies are accepted by the Australian Plant Census:

- Balanophora fungosa J.R.Forst. & G.Forst. subsp. fungosa;
- Balanophora fungosa subsp. indica (Arn.) B.Hansen.

Balanophora fungosa subsp. fungosa is monoecious, while subspecies indica is dioecious.

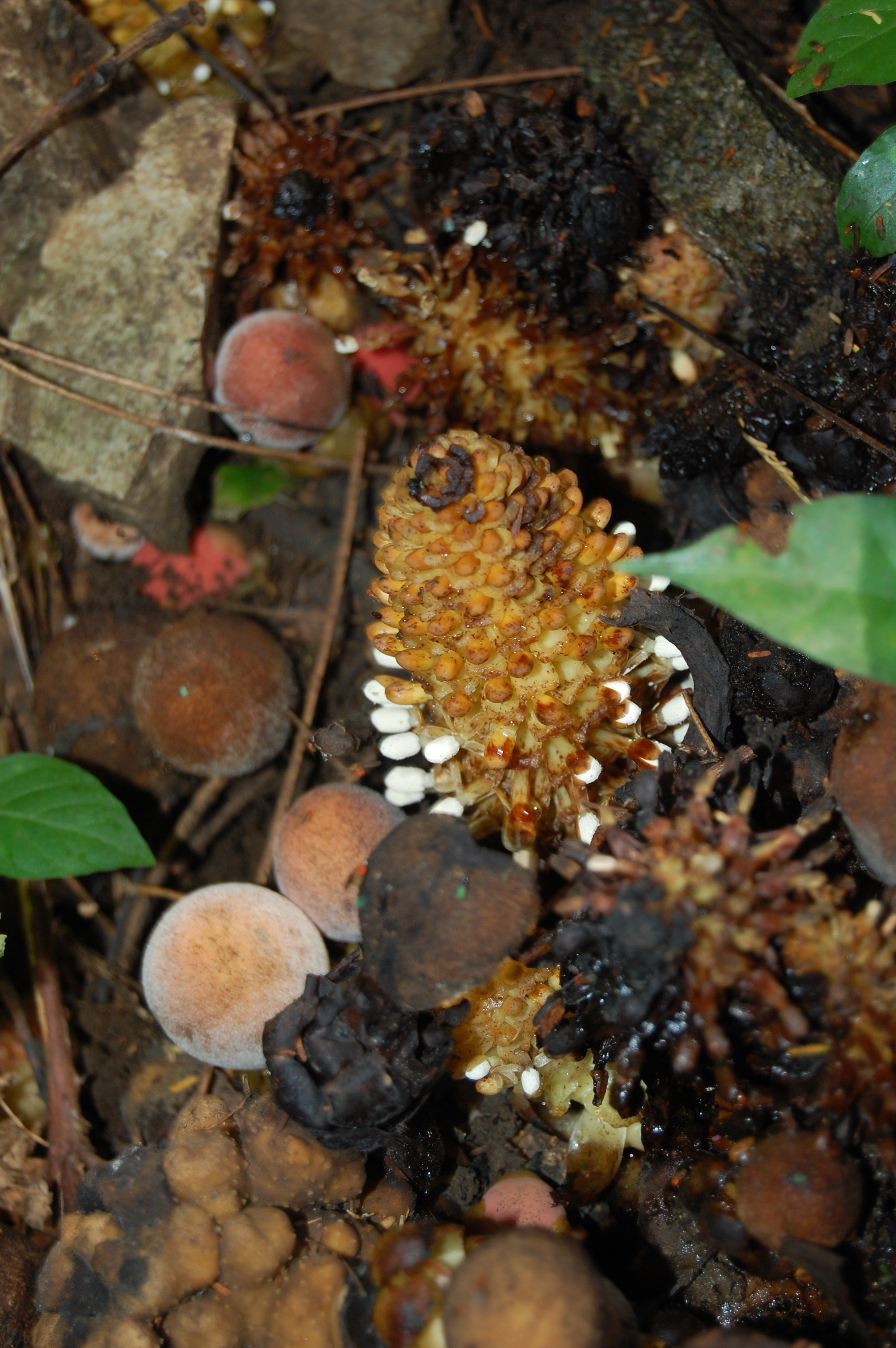
Balanophora fungosa subsp. indica in northwestern Thailand

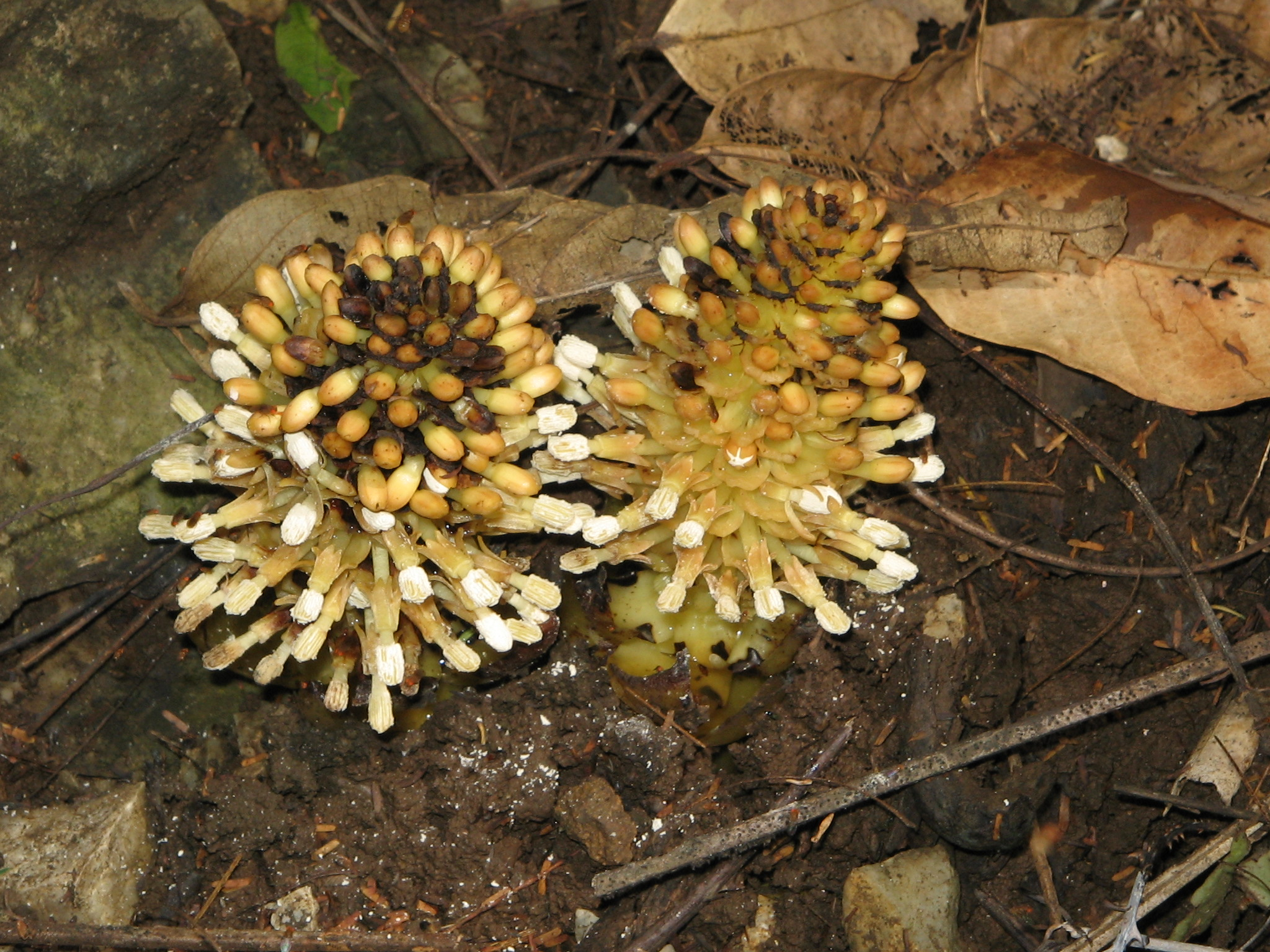
Male stems

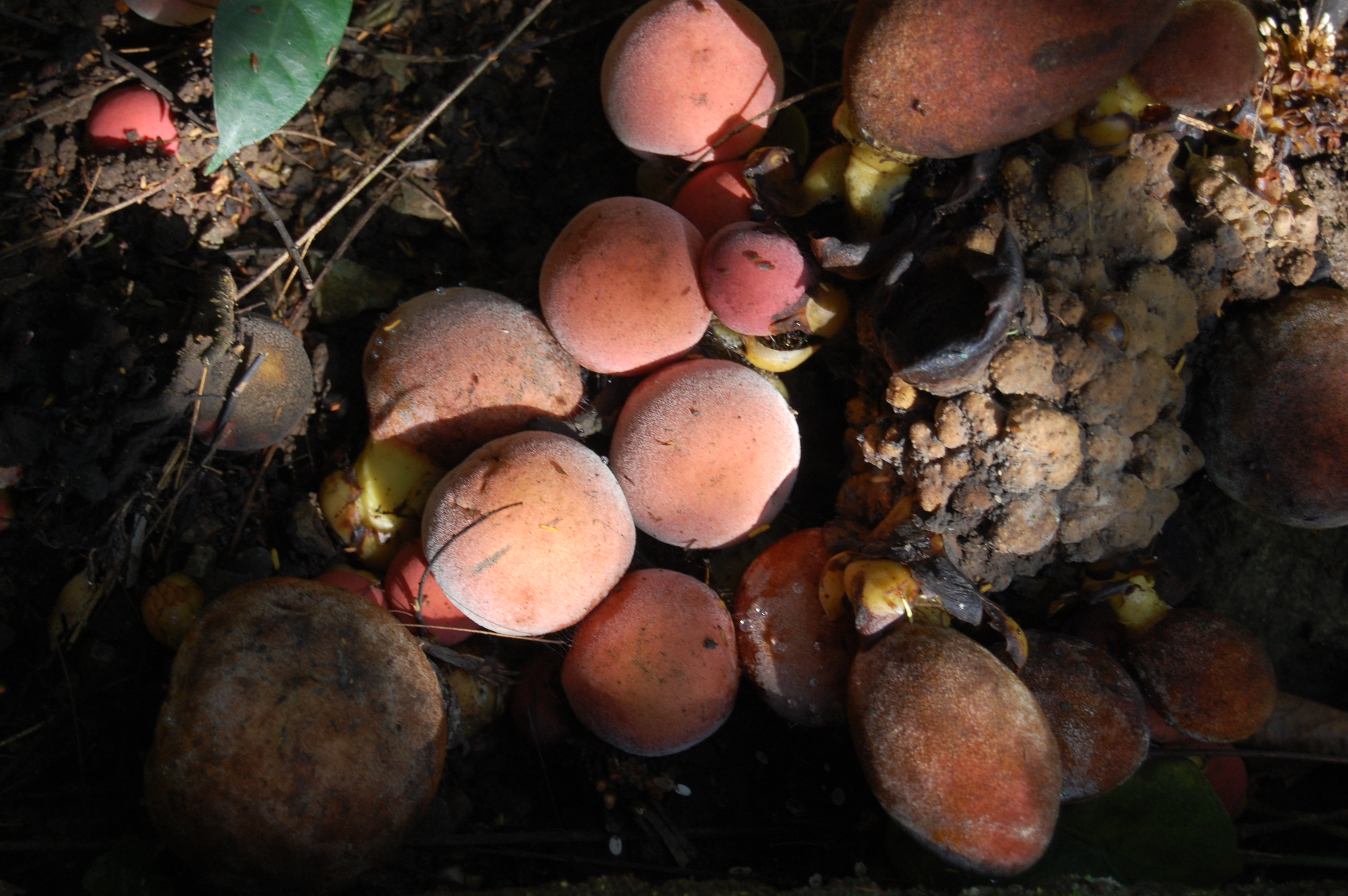
Female stems

== Distribution and habitat ==
Balanophora fungosa is found in coastal forests from near sea level to 900 metres (3,000 ft) in Australia, Taiwan, Indonesia, Ryukyu Islands, New Guinea, the Philippines, some Pacific Islands including New Caledonia, India and Cambodia. In Australia it occurs in Queensland, from about Noosa to the tip of Cape York Peninsula.

== Ecology ==
Twelve species of plant in eight families are known to be hosts to Balanophora fungosa var. indica including some of those in the genera Syzygium, Olea and Rapanea. The plant is sometimes a weed in coffee and tea plantations.

Numerous small animals visit the flowers, including ants, springtails, flies, a moth of the family noctuidae, and even rats, which appear to be attracted by the smell. Workers of the Asiatic honeybee, Apis cerana have been observed collecting pollen. Two beetle species of the genus Lasiodactylus, a moth of the family Pyralidae and a moth of the family Tipulidae use the bracts at the base of the flowers as a breeding site.

== Use as medicine ==
Some cultures, such as the Paliar people of Tamil Nadu, use B. fungosa to treat medical conditions.
