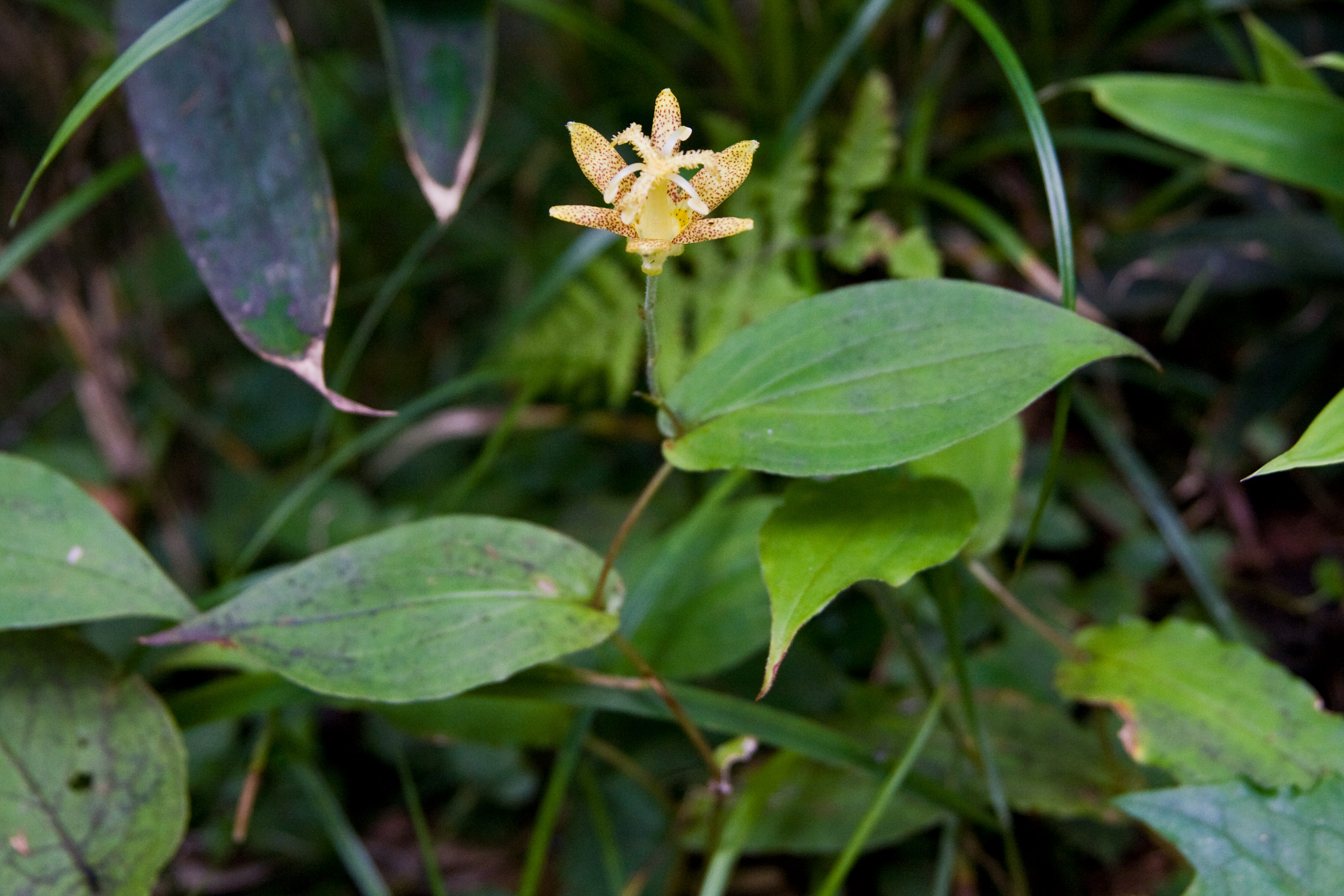

Scientific classification
- Kingdom: Plantae
- Clade: Tracheophytes
- Clade: Angiosperms
- Clade: Monocots
- Order: Liliales
- Family: Liliaceae
- Genus: Tricyrtis
- Species: T. latifolia

Binomial name
- Tricyrtis latifolia Maxim.

Synonyms
- Compsoa latifolia (Maxim.) Kuntze; Tricyrtis bakeri Koidz.; Tricyrtis makinoana Tatew.

= Tricyrtis latifolia =

Species of flowering plant

Tricyrtis latifolia, the toad lily, is an East Asian species of plants in the lily family.

As recognized by the World Checklist maintained by Kew Botanic Garden in London, T. latifolia is found only in Japan. Some authors maintain the some Chinese material also belongs to this species, but the World Checklist regards the Chinese populations as a distinct species, T. puberula. Further investigation seems warranted.
