= Balanophora coralliformis =

Scientific classification
- Kingdom: Plantae
- Clade: Tracheophytes
- Clade: Angiosperms
- Clade: Eudicots
- Order: Santalales
- Family: Balanophoraceae
- Genus: Balanophora
- Species: B. coralliformis

Binomial name
- Balanophora coralliformis Barcelona, Tandang & Pelser

Species of flowering plant

Balanophora coralliformis, sometimes known as coral plant, is a flowering plant in the family Balanophoraceae and is known only from Mount Mingan on the island of Luzon in the Philippines. Like others in its genus, it is an obligate parasite growing on the roots of rainforest trees, but differs in that its tuber appears above ground and has an elongated, repeatedly branched, coral-like structure. It was first described in 2014 and is known from fewer than 50 plants, but has not as yet been declared endangered.

== Description ==
Like other members of its genus, B. coralliformis is holoparasitic and contains no chlorophyll. It forms clumps up to about 30 cm (10 in) long above the ground, branching with cylindrical segments up to 5 cm (2.0 in) long and 0.5 to 1.2 cm (0.2 to 0.5 in) in diameter. There are 4, sometimes 5 yellow to straw-coloured overlapping, concave, egg-shaped leaves, arranged at about the same level around each segment of the above-ground tuber. The leaves are 2.4–2.7 cm (0.9–1 in) long and 1.1–2 cm (0.4–0.8 in) wide.

The plant is dioecious, having separate pistillate (female) and staminate (male) plants. The flowers appear at the end of each tuber segment, arranged in racemes. The racemes of white male flowers are 3–4 cm (1–2 in) long, 1.5–2.5 cm (0.6–1 in) wide and contain 12 to 16 flowers and the female racemes are 1.3–1.6 cm (0.5–0.6 in) long, 0.9–1.2 cm (0.4–0.5 in) wide and contain many minute, straw-coloured flowers, mostly less than 1.5 mm (0.06 in) long.

== Taxonomy and naming ==
Balanophora coralliformis was first formally described in 2014 by Julie Barcelona, Pieter Pelser and Danilo Tandang from a specimen found on the Mount Mingan summit trail in Central Luzon. The specific epithet (coralliformis) refers to the coral-like form of the species' tuber. In 2015, the International Institute for Species Exploration names it as one of the "Top 10 New Species" for species discovered in 2014.

== Distribution and habitat ==
The only-known populations of this plant occur in montane mossy forest at altitudes between 1,465 and 1,725 m (4,800 and 5,700 ft) on the south-west slopes of Mount Mingan. Balanophora papuana is also found in this area.

== Conservation ==
Fewer than 50 plants of B. coralliformis have been found and none has been observed in similar areas in Nueva Ecija and Aurora provinces but the species has not yet been declared endangered and Mount Mingan is not currently a protected area. However, the habitat of B. coralliformis is threatened by illegal logging and slash and burn agriculture.
