= Tricyrtis chinensis =

Scientific classification
- Kingdom: Plantae
- Clade: Tracheophytes
- Clade: Angiosperms
- Clade: Monocots
- Order: Liliales
- Family: Liliaceae
- Genus: Tricyrtis
- Species: T. chinensis

Binomial name
- Tricyrtis chinensis Hir.Takah.bis

Synonyms
- Tricyrtis bakeri var. glabra Koidz.

Species of flowering plant

Tricyrtis chinensis is a Chinese species of herbaceous plant in the lily family. It occurs in southeastern China (Provinces of Anhui, Fujian, Guangdong, Guangxi, Hunan, Jiangxi, and Zhejiang).

Plants of this species used to be thought to belong to the Japanese species Tricyrtis macropoda. They differ, however, in several respects, most notably in that the rhizome is annual, rather than perennial. Above ground, T. chinensis is generally taller than T. macropoda (often over 1.5 m), with larger leaves and often many more flowers on each plant (sometimes over 50). The flowers are white or yellow with small purple spots (In T. macropoda the ground colour is always white).
