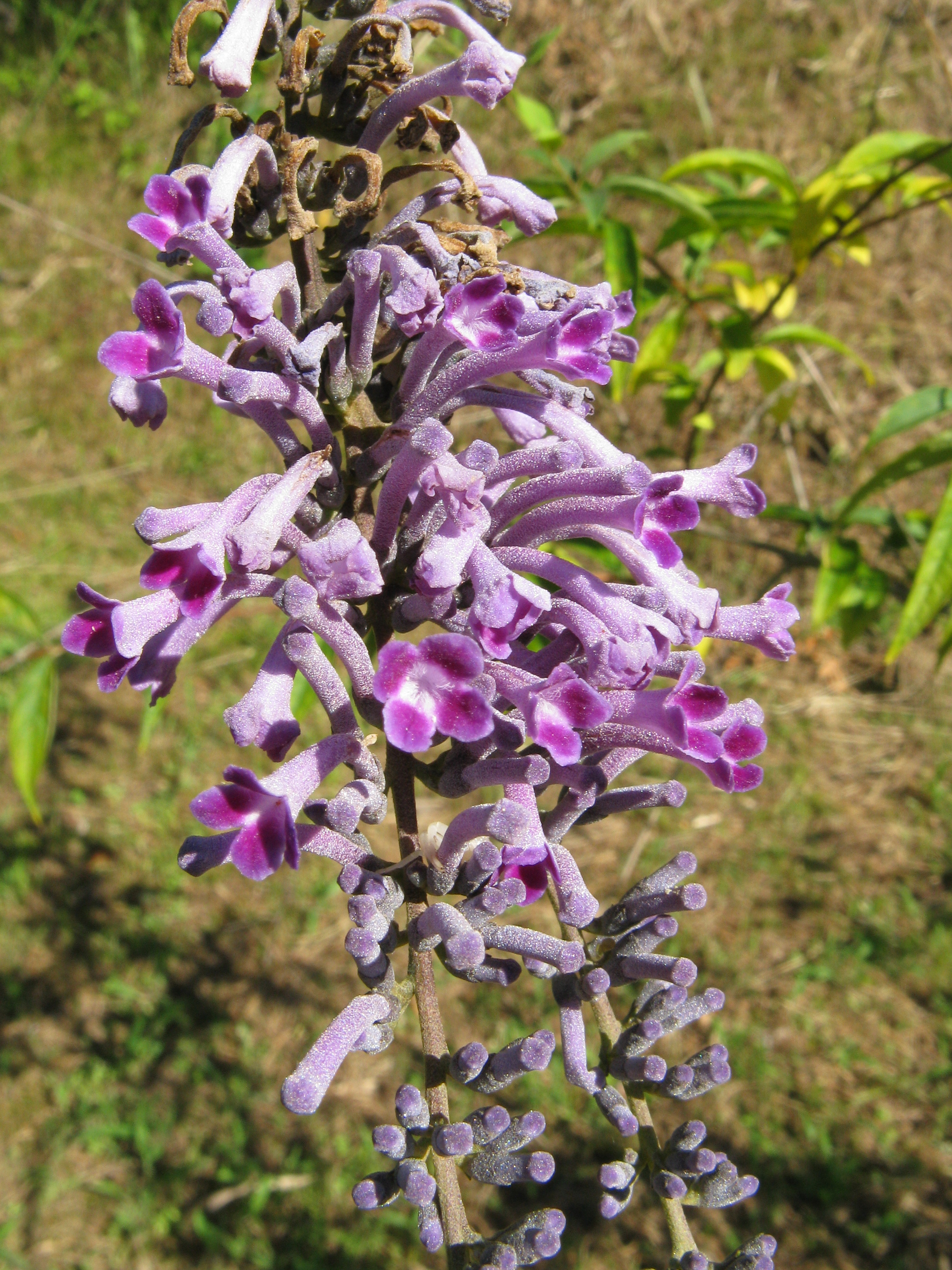

Scientific classification
- Kingdom: Plantae
- Clade: Tracheophytes
- Clade: Angiosperms
- Clade: Eudicots
- Clade: Asterids
- Order: Lamiales
- Family: Scrophulariaceae
- Genus: Buddleja
- Species: B. japonica

Binomial name
- Buddleja japonica Hemsl.

Synonyms
- Buddleja curviflora hort. ex. Carr. In error

= Buddleja japonica =

Species of flowering plant

Buddleja japonica is a deciduous shrub in the family Scrophulariaceae. It is native to Honshu and Shikoku, Japan, where it grows on mountain slopes amid scrub. The shrub was named and described by Hemsley in 1889, and introduced to Western cultivation in 1896.

== Description ==
Buddleja japonica grows to < 1.5 m in height in the wild, open in habit and sparsely branched. The branches are tetragonous and winged. The leaves are narrowly lanceolate, < 20 cm long by < 5 cm wide, the upper surface dark green and glabrous, the underside tawny felted. The flowers form dense, drooping terminal panicles < 20 cm long, usually pale lilac in colour, from July to October. Overall, the species is considered of little horticultural merit and is also comparatively short-lived. Ploidy: 2n = 38.

== Cultivation ==
In the UK a specimen is grown as part of the NCCPG national buddleja collection at Longstock Park Nursery, near Stockbridge, Hampshire. Hardiness: USDA zones 8–9.

== Varieties ==
- Buddleja japonica var. insignis (Carr.) E. H. Wilson. A plant with a denser habit and more brightly coloured flowers. In the absence of any living specimens or preserved material, the plant was considered probably a hybrid of B. japonica and B. lindleyana by Leeuwenberg
