= Balanophonin =

Identifiers
CAS Number	118916-57-7; (+):: 215319-47-4; (-):: 80286-36-8
3D model (JSmol)	Interactive image
ChEMBL	ChEMBL253335
ChemSpider	10197147; 10366582
PubChem CID	23252258
- InChI: InChI=1S/C20H20O6/c1-24-17-10-13(5-6-16(17)23)19-15(11-22)14-8-12(4-3-7-21)9-18(25-2)20(14)26-19/h3-10,15,19,22-23H,11H2,1-2H3/b4-3+/t15-,19+/m0/s1 Key: GWCSSLSMGCFIFR-LNFBDUAVSA-N
- SMILES: COC1=CC(=CC2=C1O[C@@H]([C@H]2CO)C3=CC(=C(C=C3)O)OC)/C=C/C=O

Properties
Chemical formula	C_{20}H_{20}O_{6}
Molar mass	356.37 g/mol
- Except where otherwise noted, data are given for materials in their standard state (at 25 °C [77 °F], 100 kPa). Infobox references

Balanophonin is a neo-lignan. It is a bioactive compound which can be isolated from Dipteryx odorata and Balanophora japonica.
