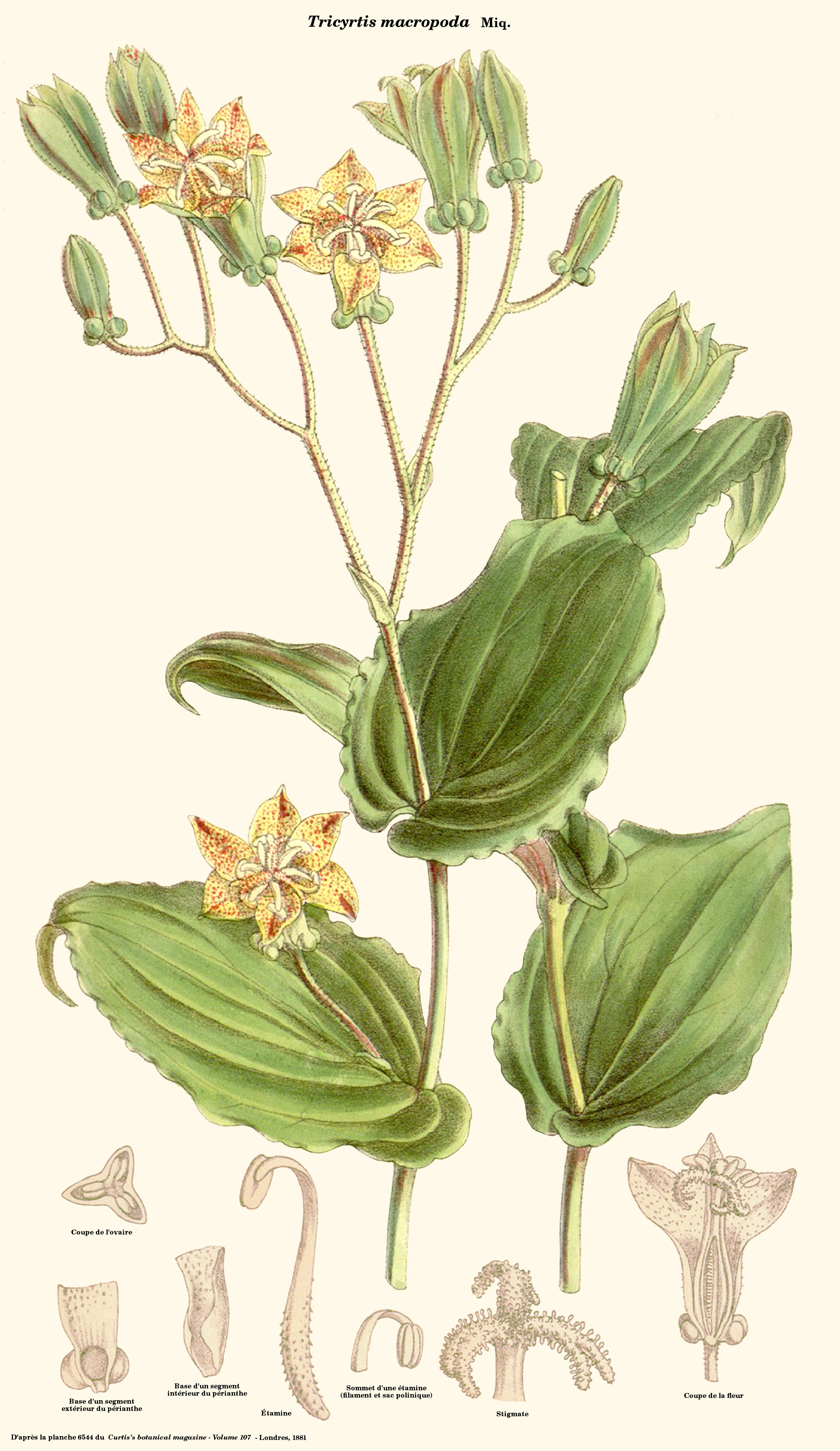

Scientific classification
- Kingdom: Plantae
- Clade: Tracheophytes
- Clade: Angiosperms
- Clade: Monocots
- Order: Liliales
- Family: Liliaceae
- Genus: Tricyrtis
- Species: T. macropoda

Binomial name
- Tricyrtis macropoda Miq.

Synonyms
- Compsoa macropoda (Miq.) Kuntze

= Tricyrtis macropoda =

Species of flowering plant

Tricyrtis macropoda is an East Asian plant species in the lily family native to China, Korea, and Japan.
