= Pluviatilol =

Names
- IUPAC name (7α,7′β,8β,8′β)-3-Methoxy-3′,4′-[methylenebis(oxy)]-7,9′:7′,9-diepoxylignan-4-ol
- Systematic IUPAC name 4-[(1R,3aS,4S,6aS)-4-(2H-1,3-Benzodioxol-5-yl)tetrahydro-1H,3H-furo[3,4-c]furan-1-yl]-2-methoxyphenol

Identifiers
CAS Number	28115-67-5
3D model (JSmol)	Interactive image
ChEMBL	ChEMBL2011539
ChemSpider	28531462
PubChem CID	70695727
- InChI: InChI=1S/C20H20O6/c1-22-17-6-11(2-4-15(17)21)19-13-8-24-20(14(13)9-23-19)12-3-5-16-18(7-12)26-10-25-16/h2-7,13-14,19-21H,8-10H2,1H3/t13-,14-,19-,20+/m1/s1 Key: VBIRCRCPHNUJAS-FQZPYLGXSA-N
- SMILES: COC1=C(C=CC(=C1)[C@@H]2[C@@H]3CO[C@H]([C@@H]3CO2)C4=CC5=C(C=C4)OCO5)O

Properties
Chemical formula	C_{20}H_{20}O_{6}
Molar mass	356.374 g·mol^{−1}
- Except where otherwise noted, data are given for materials in their standard state (at 25 °C [77 °F], 100 kPa). Infobox references

Pluviatilol is a lignan. It is a Lindera obtusiloba isolate with anti-allergic activity.
