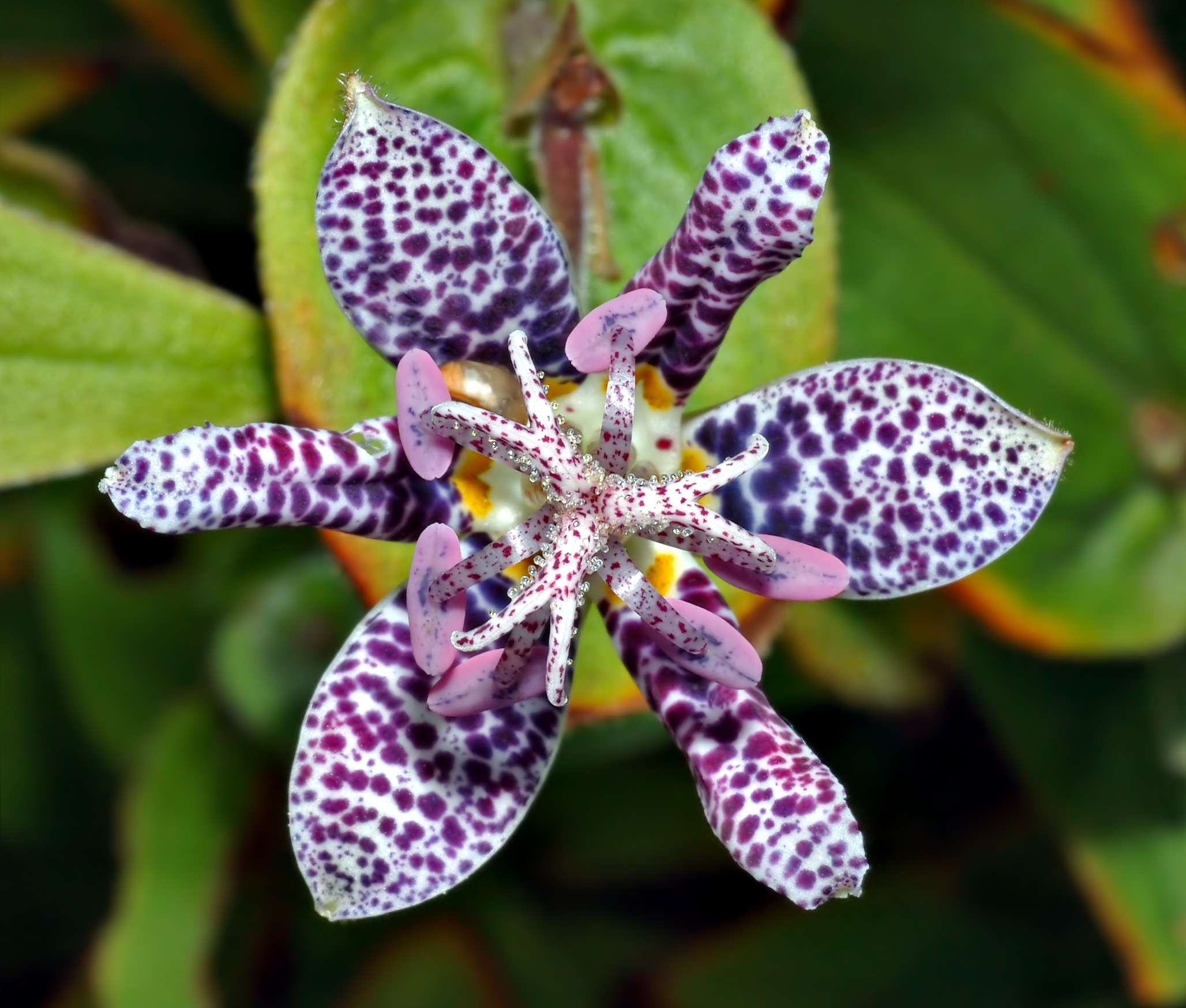
- Tricyrtis hirta

Scientific classification
- Kingdom: Plantae
- Clade: Tracheophytes
- Clade: Angiosperms
- Clade: Monocots
- Order: Liliales
- Family: Liliaceae
- Subfamily: Calochortoideae
- Genus: Tricyrtis; Wall.

Type species
- Tricyrtis maculata (D.Don) J.F.Macbr.

Synonyms
- Compsoa D.Don; Compsanthus Spreng.; Brachycyrtis Koidz.

= Tricyrtis =

Genus of flowering plants

Tricyrtis is a genus of Asian flowering plants in the lily family, with approximately 20 known species. The species are commonly known in English as toad lilies. The genus has a native range from the Himalayas to eastern Asia, including China, Japan, Philippines and Taiwan, and a few species are cultivated for their ornamental qualities in other parts of the world.

== Description ==
Tricyrtis are herbaceous perennials with creeping rhizomes. The stems are typically erect or maybe ascending, and sometimes branched from the middle to the top. The subsessile leaves are arranged alternately along the stems. The inflorescences are most commonly thyrse or thyrsoid, or rarely the flowers are arranged into a raceme. The showy, solitary flowers are bisexual. Perianth campanulate or trumpet-shaped with six free tepals arranged into two whorls: the outer whorl has nectar secreting pouches, while the inner whorl has upright tepals with dorsal crests. The tepals are white or yellow with purplish spots, usually recurved or reflexed. The six stamens are inserted at base of the tepals, and the filaments are slightly flattened, forming a short tube. The anthers are dorsifixed. The three-loculed ovary have many ovules per locule. The styles are arranged into a column. The three-angled fruits are broadly cylindrical capsules and when ripe release many small, flat, ovate to orbicular shaped seeds.

== Taxonomy ==
The genus is subdivided into four sections, with about 20 species. Accepted species include:

Sections	Image	Scientific name	Distribution
Brachycyrtis		Tricyrtis ishiiana (Kitag. & T.Koyama) Ohwi & Okuyama	Honshu Island in Japan
Brachycyrtis		Tricyrtis macrantha Maxim.	Shikoku Island in Japan
Brachycyrtis		Tricyrtis macranthopsis Masam.	Kii Peninsula in Japan
Flavae		Tricyrtis flava Maxim	Kyushu Island in Japan
Flavae		Tricyrtis nana Yatabe	Japan
Flavae		Tricyrtis ohsumiensis Masam.	Kyushu Island in Japan
Flavae		Tricyrtis perfoliata Masam.	Kyushu Island in Japan
Hirtae		Tricyrtis formosana Baker	Taiwan, Nansei-shoto (Ryukyu Islands)
Hirtae		Tricyrtis hirta (Thunb.) Hook.	Japan
Hirtae		Tricyrtis lasiocarpa Matsum.	Taiwan
Tricyrtis		Tricyrtis affinis Makino	Japan
Tricyrtis		Tricyrtis chinensis Hiroshi Takahashi	China
Tricyrtis		Tricyrtis dilatata Nakai	South Korea
Tricyrtis		Tricyrtis imeldae Guthnick	Mindanao Island in Philippines
Tricyrtis		Tricyrtis latifolia Maxim.	Japan
Tricyrtis		Tricyrtis macropoda Miq.	Japan
Tricyrtis		Tricyrtis maculata (D.Don) J.F.Macbr.	Nepal, Sikkim, Bhutan, Assam, Myanmar, China
Tricyrtis		Tricyrtis puberula Nakai & Kitag.	China
Tricyrtis		Tricyrtis setouchiensis Hir.Takah.	Honshu + Shikoku Islands in Japan
Tricyrtis		Tricyrtis suzukii Masam.	Taiwan

== Cultivation ==
Tricyrtis species are perennial herbaceous plants that grow at the edge of forests. They prefer shade or part shade and rich, moist soil. Toad lilies bloom in summer to fall. They are hardy enough to handle sudden changes of winter from mild to blustery cold.

== See also ==
- List of plants known as lily

== Bibliography ==
- Wallich, Nathaniel (1824–1826). Tentamen Florae Napalensis Illustratae. Calcutta: Asiatic Lithographic Press.
- Pink, A. (2004). Gardening for the Million. Project Gutenberg Literary Archive Foundation. ISBN 1-4264-5707-3.
- Diversity of Life: Tricyrtis - retrieved 6 June 2006
- Kim, Jung Sung; Hong, Jeong-Ki; Chase, Mark W.; Fay, Michael F.; Kim, Joo-Hwan (May 2013). "Familial relationships of the monocot order Liliales based on a molecular phylogenetic analysis using four plastid loci: matK, rbcL, atpB and atpF-H". Botanical Journal of the Linnean Society. 172 (1): 5–21. doi:10.1111/boj.12039.
- Kono, Yoshiko; Peng, Ching - I; Chao, Chien - Ti; Oginuma, Kazuo (2015). "Karyomorphological study of Taiwanese Tricyrtis (Liliaceae) and the taxonomic implication". Chromosome Botany. 10 (2): 61–66. doi:10.3199/iscb.10.61.
- Wan Pyo Hong, Sophia; L. Jury, Stephen (9 July 2012). "Phylogeny and Molecular Evolution of Tricyrtis (Liliaceae s.l.) Inferred from Plastid DNA matK Spacer Nucleotide Sequences". Journal of Plant Studies. 1 (2). doi:10.5539/jps.v1n2p1.
- Hong, S. W.-P.; Jury, S. L. (7 September 2011). "Phylogeny and divergence times inferred from rps16 sequence data analyses for Tricyrtis (Liliaceae), an endemic genus of north-east Asia". AoB Plants. 2011 plr025. doi:10.1093/aobpla/plr025. PMC 3186281. PMID 22476495.
- Wan Pyo Hong, Sophia; L. Jury, Stephen (9 July 2012). "Phylogeny and Molecular Evolution of Tricyrtis (Liliaceae s.l.) Inferred from Plastid DNA matK Spacer Nucleotide Sequences". Journal of Plant Studies. 1 (2). doi:10.5539/jps.v1n2p1.
