= Tricyrtis macrantha =

- Weeping habit
- Mouth of flower

Scientific classification
- Kingdom: Plantae
- Clade: Tracheophytes
- Clade: Angiosperms
- Clade: Monocots
- Order: Liliales
- Family: Liliaceae
- Genus: Tricyrtis
- Species: T. macrantha

Binomial name
- Tricyrtis macrantha Maxim.

Synonyms
- Brachycyrtis macrantha (Maxim.) Koidz.

Species of plant

Tricyrtis macrantha, the yellow Chinese toad lily, is a species of flowering plant in the family Liliaceae. It is native to Japan's Kōchi Prefecture on the island of Shikoku. A perennial, it prefer partial to full shade and permanently wet soil, and is hardy to USDA zone 4. Although it reaches 60 cm (24 in) tall, in the garden it is best planted so that its stems and flowers can drape down to their fullest extent, about 100 cm (39 in).
