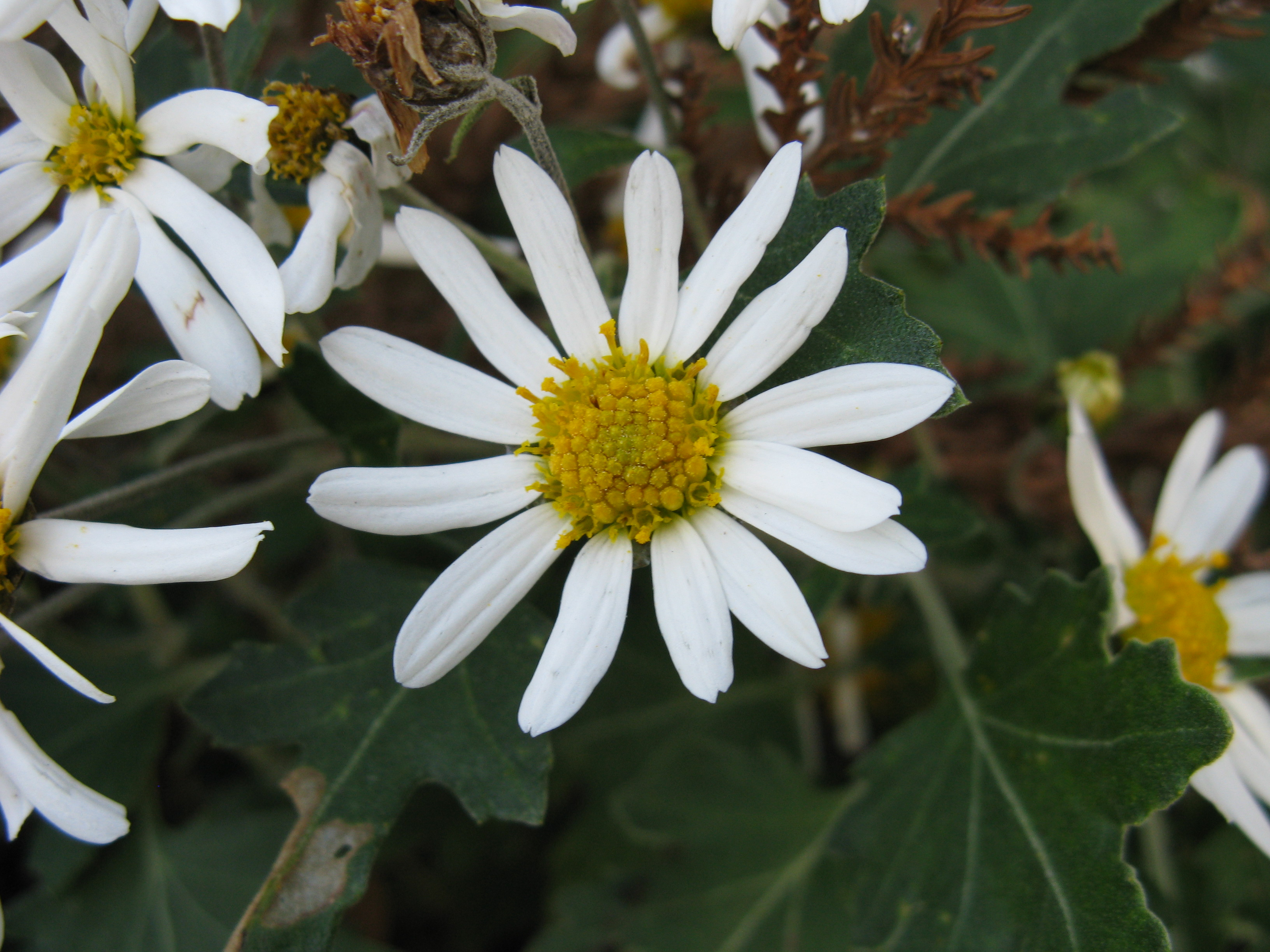

Scientific classification
- Kingdom: Plantae
- Clade: Tracheophytes
- Clade: Angiosperms
- Clade: Eudicots
- Clade: Asterids
- Order: Asterales
- Family: Asteraceae
- Genus: Chrysanthemum
- Species: C. japonense

Binomial name
- Chrysanthemum japonense (Makino) Nakai

Synonyms
- Homotypic Synonyms: Chrysanthemum × morifolium f. japonense Makino; Dendranthema japonense (Makino) Kitam.; Dendranthema occidentalijaponense Kitam.; Heterotypic Synonyms: Chrysanthemum japonense var. ashizuriense Kitam.; Chrysanthemum ornatum var. ashizuriense (Kitam.) Kitam.; Dendranthema japonense var. ashizuriense (Kitam.) Kitam.; Dendranthema japonicum var. ashizuriense (Kitam.) Kitam.; Dendranthema occidentalijaponense var. ashizuriense (Kitam.) H.Koyama

= Chrysanthemum japonense =

Species of flowering plant

Chrysanthemum japonense is a species of flowering plant in the family Asteraceae. It is sometimes referred to by the common names ashizuri noji-giku Ashizuri (Japanese) meaning "Point wild roadside daisy" or gold / silver chrysanthemum in English).

It has 27 pairs of chromosomes. A perennial flowering plant, it has leaves between 3–5 cm in length and flower heads that are 3–4.5 cm with white petals. Typically, flowering occurs in October to December annually. It is the floral emblem of Hyōgo Prefecture.

== Distribution ==
Currently it is classified as semi-endangered. It is endemic to Japan in Shikoku (coastal area of Kochi prefecture and Ehime prefecture).

== Industrial uses ==
It is used in the manufacture of nojigiku alcohol.
