= Balanophora japonica =

Scientific classification
- Kingdom: Plantae
- Clade: Tracheophytes
- Clade: Angiosperms
- Clade: Eudicots
- Order: Santalales
- Family: Balanophoraceae
- Genus: Balanophora
- Species: B. japonica

Binomial name
- Balanophora japonica Makino 1902

Synonyms
- Balania japonica Tiegh.; Balanophora dioica Unger

Species of flowering plant

Balanophora japonica (Japanese:ツチトリモチ; Chinese:日本蛇菰) is a species of flowering plant species in the family Balanophoraceae. It is endemic to Japan.

Balanophonin is a neo-lignan that can be found in B. japonica. It also contains ellagitannins, lignan glycosides, caffeoyl, coumaroyl, galloyl, hexahydroxydiphenoyl glucoses and the hydrolyzable tannins balanophotannin D, E, F and G that contain an oxidized hexahydroxydiphenoyl (HHDP) group.
