= Philippine Taxonomic Initiative =

Philippine research institute

The Philippine Taxonomic Initiative (PTI) is a private Philippine research institute and non-profit organization founded in 2018, located in the Philippines.

== Publications ==
Publications:

- M.R.B. Altamirano, M.C.D. Malay, & R.A.A. Bustamante. Check List 18(4): 829-837 (2022). New distribution record of Habenaria gibsonii var. foetida Blatt. & McCann (Orchidaceae, Orchidoideae) from Panay Island, Philippines, with notes on allied taxa, ecology, and conservation
- C.J.P. Dela Cruz, S.R. Concepcion, & Y.P. Ang. Taiwaniana 67(2): 223‒228 (2022). Begonia francisabuidii, (section Baryandra, Begoniaceae) a new species endemic to Albay, Luzon Island, Philippines
- J.A. Mansibang, & T.L.P. Senarillos. Philippine Journal of Science, 151(1), 497-501 (2022). Naked-faced Spiderhunter (Arachnothera clarae): a Flower Visitor and a Potential Pollinator of the Genus Aeschynanthus
- R.A.A. Bustamante, & P.B. Pelser. Blumea 67 (1): 15–19 (2022). A new Philippine species of Ridsdalea (Rubiaceae, Ixoroideae) from karst vegetation in Palawan
- L.M. Camangeg, W. Cabanillas, M.N. Tamayo, V.C. Mangussad, Y.P. Ang, & M.A.K. Pranada. Gardens’ Bulletin Singapore, 73, 399-412 (2021). Two endemic new species of Begonia (Begoniaceae) from Palawan, Philippines
- L.M. Magtoto, M.N. Tamayo, L. Udasco, Jr., & R.A.A. Bustamante. Phytotaxa, 525(4), 295(300) (2021). Ardisia kalimbahin (Primulaceae, Myrsinoideae), a new species from the Philippines
- K.R.F. Mazo, J. Mansibang, L.G. Aribal, & M.N. Tamayo. Webbia. Journal of Plant Taxonomy and Geography 76(2), 203-212 (2021). You ‘Sau’ Me! A new species and a rediscovery in the genus Saurauia (Actinidiaceae) from Zamboanga Peninsula, Mindanao Island, Philippines
- R.A.A. Bustamante, C. Claudel, J.C. Altomonte, L. Udasco Jr., & M.N. Tamayo. Nordic Journal of Botany, 39(8) (2021). Amorphophallus minimus (Araceae), a new species from the montane forest of Nueva Ecija, Luzon island, Philippines
- K.R.F. Mazo, L.G. Aribal, R.A.A. Bustamante, & Y.P. Ang. Phytotaxa, 516(1), 101–107 (2021). Begonia tinuyopensis (sect. Petermannia, Begoniaceae), a new species from Zamboanga Del Norte, Philippines
- M.N. Tamayo, R.A.A. Bustamante, & P. Fritsch. PhytoKeys, 179, 145–154 (2021). Vaccinium exiguum (Ericaceae, Vaccinieae), a new species from the ultramafic summit of Mt. Victoria, Palawan Island, Philippines
- P.B. Pelser, F. Brambach, J. Mansibang, H. Schaefer, R. Kiew, & J.F. Barcelona. Blumea 66 pp96–100 (2021). New combinations and names for some Philippine vascular plants
- D.P. Buenavista, Y.P. Ang, M.A.K. Pranada, D.S. Salas, E. Mollee & M. McDonald. Phytotaxa 497 (2021). Begonia bangsamoro (Begoniaceae, section Petermannia), a new species from Mindanao island, the Philippines
- S.M. Olimpos & J. Mansibang. Phytotaxa 487 (2021). Aeschynanthus rejieae (Gesneriaceae), a new species of lipstick vine from Tawi-Tawi, Philippines
- A.J.L. Saavedra, & K.M.E. Pitogo. Philippine Journal of Science (2021). Richness and Distribution of Orchids (Orchidaceae) in the Forests of Mount Busa, Sarangani, Southern Mindanao, Philippines
- D. Tandang, T. Reyes Jr., R.A.A. Bustamante, J. Callado, E. Tadiosa, E. Agoo, & S. P. Lyon. Phytotaxa 477 (2020). Corybas boholensis (Orchidaceae): A New Jewel Orchid Species from Bohol Island, Central Visayas, Philippines
- P. Quakenbush, P.L. Malabrigo Jr., A.G.A. Umali, A.B. Tobia, L.M. Camangeg, Y. P. Ang, & R.A.A. Bustamante. Systematic Botany (2020). Notes on the Medinilla (Melastomataceae) of Palawan, Philippines, Including Two New Species: M. simplicymosa and M. ultramaficola.
- R.A.A. Bustamante, J. Mansibang, W. Hetterschied, & M.N. Tamayo. Nordic Journal of Botany e02982(2020) 2. Amorphophallus caudatus (Thomsonieae, Araceae) a new species from Camarines Norte, Luzon island, the Philippines
- R.A.A. Bustamante, M.N. Tamayo, & W. Hetterschied, Webbia 75 (2020) 288. Rediscovery of a lost type: solving the mysterious identity of A. longispathaceus Engl. & Gehrm. (Araceae)
- M.G. Rule, Y.P. Ang, R.R. Rubite, R. Docot, R. Bustamante, & A. Robinson, Phytotaxa 470 (2020) 226. Begonia makuruyot (Begoniaceae, section Baryandra), a new species from Surigao del Norte Province, Philippines
- R.A.A. Bustamante, D. Tandang, M.A. Pranada, & Y.P. Ang, Phytotaxa 458 (2020) 217. Begonia truncatifolia (Begoniaceae, Sect. Baryandra) A new species from Palawan Island, The Philippines.
- M.N. Tamayo, M.A. Pranada, & R.A.A. Bustamante. Phytotaxa 455 (2020) 241. Dendrochilum ignisiflorum (Coelogyneae, Orchidaceae), A new species from Luzon island, Philippines.
- Y.P. Ang, D. Tandang, R.R. Rubite, & R.A.A. Bustamante. Phytotaxa 455 (2020) 197. Begonia beijnenii (Batyandra, Begoniaceae), A new species from San Vicente, Palawan, The Philippines
- Y.P. Ang, D. Tandang, J.M. Agcaoilli, & R.A.A. Bustamante. Phytotaxa 453 (2020) 245. Begonia cabanillasii (section Baryandra, Begoniaceae) a new species from el nido, Palawan, The Philippines
- D. Tandang, R.A.A. Bustamante, U.F. Ferreras, U.F. Hadsall, S. Pim-Lyon, & A.S. Robinson. Phytotaxa 446 (2020) 136. Corybas circinatus (Orchidaceae) A new species from Palawan, The Philippines.
- R.V.A. Docot, L.C.P. Santiago, H. Funakoshi, & N.F. Lam. Edinburgh Journal of Botany, 77(3), 377–390 (2020).Two new species of Boesenbergia (Zinginberaceae) from Palawan, Philippines
- R.R. Rubite, M. Irabagon, D. Palacio, Y.P. Ang, & R.A.A. Bustamante. Phytotaxa 439 (2020) 291. Begonia caramoanensis (Begoniaceae) A new species from camarines sur, Philippines.
- J.M. Agacoilli, J. Barcelona, & P.B. Pelser. Phytotaxa 435 (2020) 26. Melastoma malabituin (Melastomaceae): A new species from northern Luzon, Philippines
- J. Tandang, E. Galindon, F. Tadiosa, V. Coritico, Amoroso, Lagunday, R.A.A. Bustamante, D. Pennys, & P. Fritsch. PhytoKeys 139:91-97 (2020) . Dilochia deleoniae (Orchidaceae), A new species from Mindanao, Philippines
- W.L.A. Hetterscheid, M.P. Medecilo, J.R.C. Callado, & A. Galloway. Blumea 65, 2020: 1–9. New species of Amorphophallus (Araceae) in the Philippines and an updated key
- J. van Beijnen & E.D. Jose. The Palawan Scientist, 12 (2020). Botanical observations from a threatened riverine lowland forest in Aborlan, Palawan, Philippines
- A.S. Robinson, S. Zamudio, & R. Caballero. Phytotaxa 423 (2019) 22. Nepenthes erucoides (Nepenthaceae), An ultramaficous micro-endemic from Dinagat islands province, Northern Mindanao, Philippines
- R.V.A. Docot, N.P. Mendez, & C.B.M. Domingo. Gardens’ Bulletin Singapore 71 (2019) 448. A new species of hornstedia and a new species record of Globba (Zingiberaceae) from Palawan, Philippines
