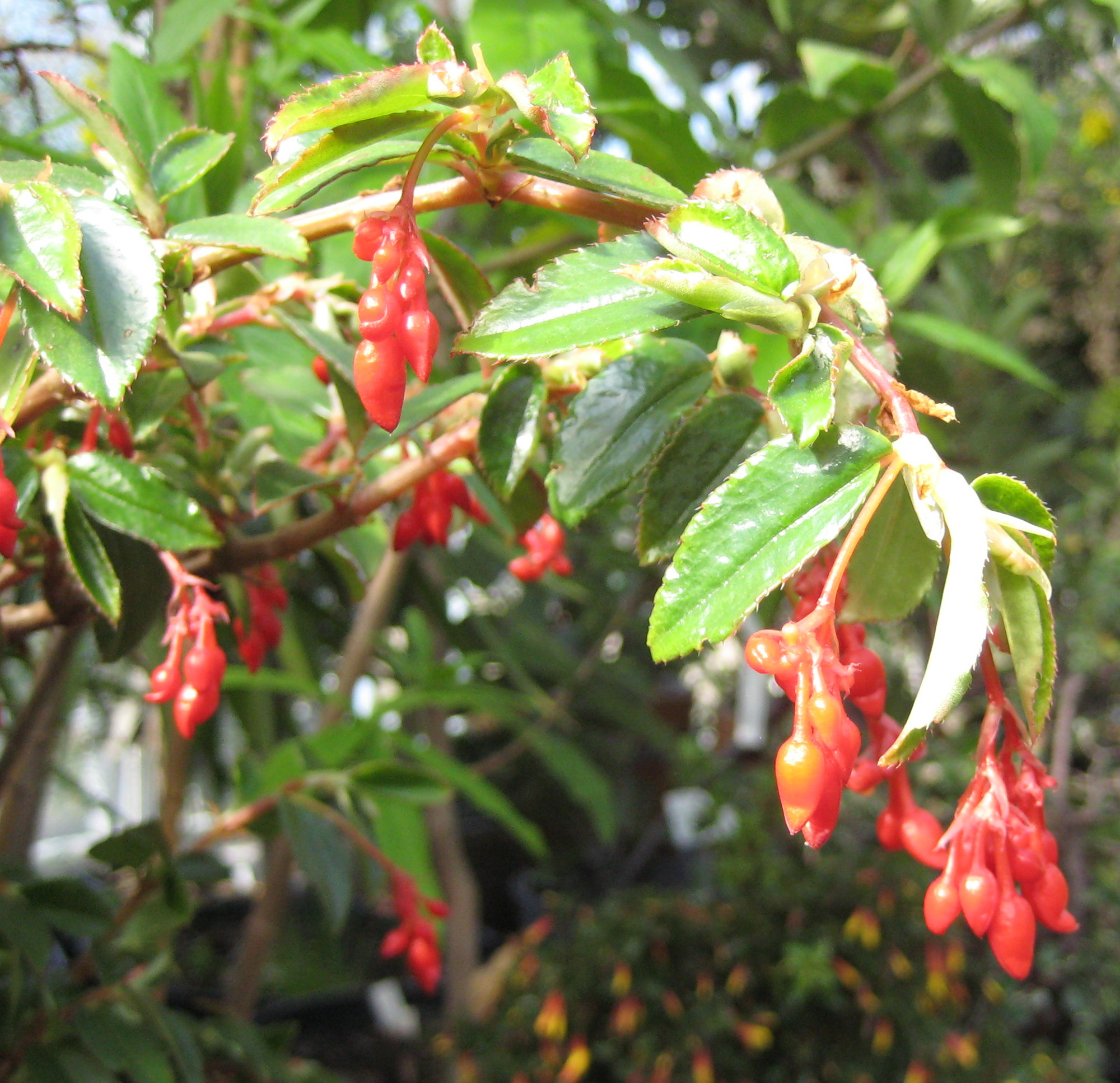
- At the Dresden Botanical Garden
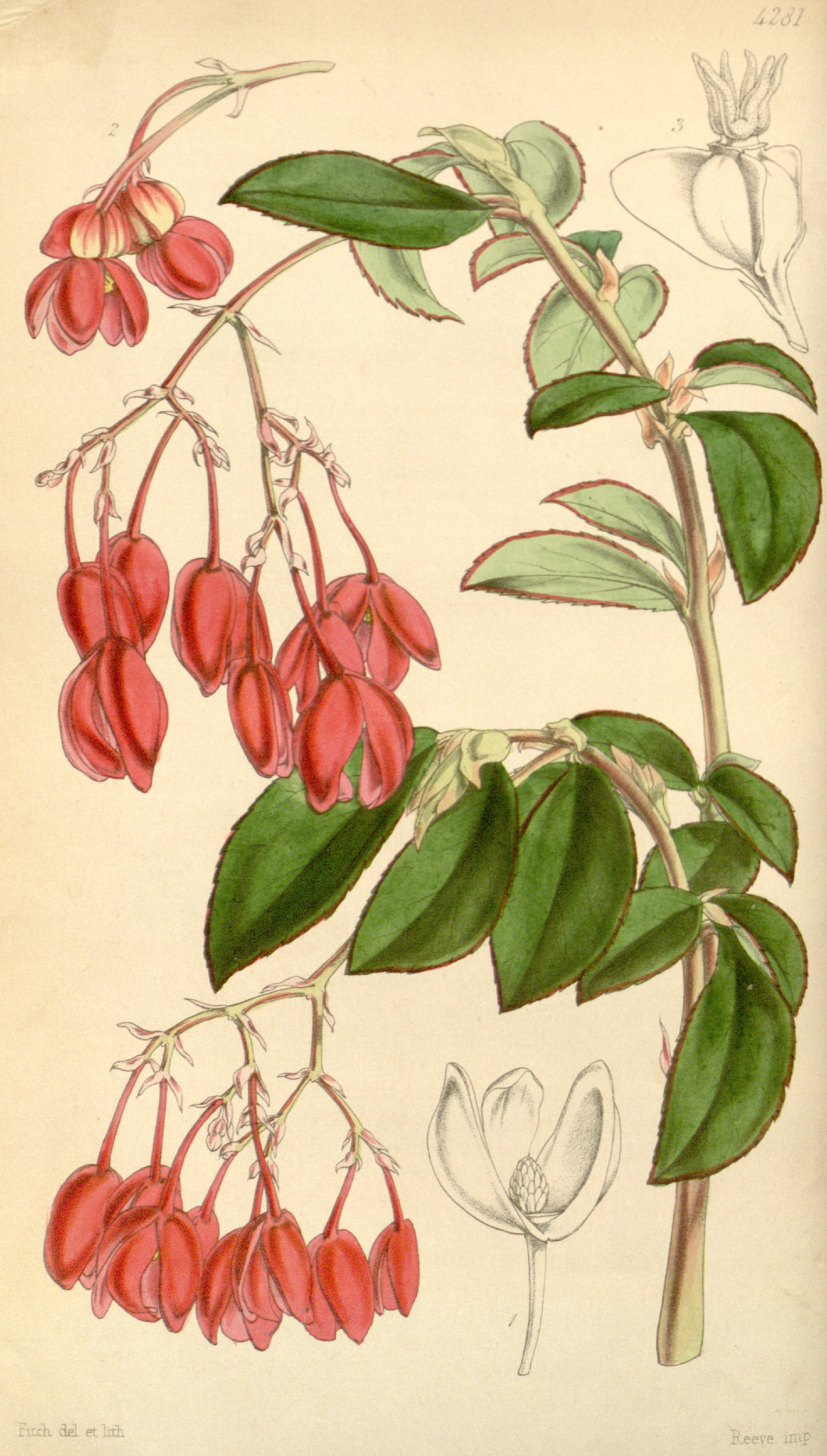
- Botanical illustration

Scientific classification
- Kingdom: Plantae
- Clade: Tracheophytes
- Clade: Angiosperms
- Clade: Eudicots
- Clade: Rosids
- Order: Cucurbitales
- Family: Begoniaceae
- Genus: Begonia
- Species: B. fuchsioides

Binomial name
- Begonia fuchsioides Hook.

Synonyms
- List: Begonia floribunda Carrière; Begonia foliosa var. miniata (A.DC.) L.B.Sm. & B.G.Schub.; Begonia fuchsioides var. miniata (Planch. & Linden) A.DC.; Begonia fuchsioides f. miniata (Planch. & Linden) Voss; Begonia fulgens Lemoine; Begonia miniata Planch. & Linden; Begonia multiflora Benth.; Tittelbachia fuchsioides (Hook.) Klotzsch; Tittelbachia miniata (Planch. & Linden) Klotzsch

= Begonia fuchsioides =

Species of flowering plant

Begonia fuchsioides, the fuchsia begonia, is a species of flowering plant in the family Begoniaceae. It is native to Ecuador, Colombia, and western Venezuela, and has been introduced to Hawaii and Réunion. A small bush reaching 2 ft (60 cm), it is hardy to USDA zone 10a.

== Hybrids ==
It is a parent of the following artificial hybrids:

- Begonia × ascotiensis J.B.Weber – B. cucullata Willd. × B. fuchsioides Hook.
- Begonia × digswelliana Dombrain – B. fuchsioides Hook. × B. obliqua L.
- Begonia × ingramii T.Moore & Ayres – B. fuchsioides Hook. × B. minor Jacq.
