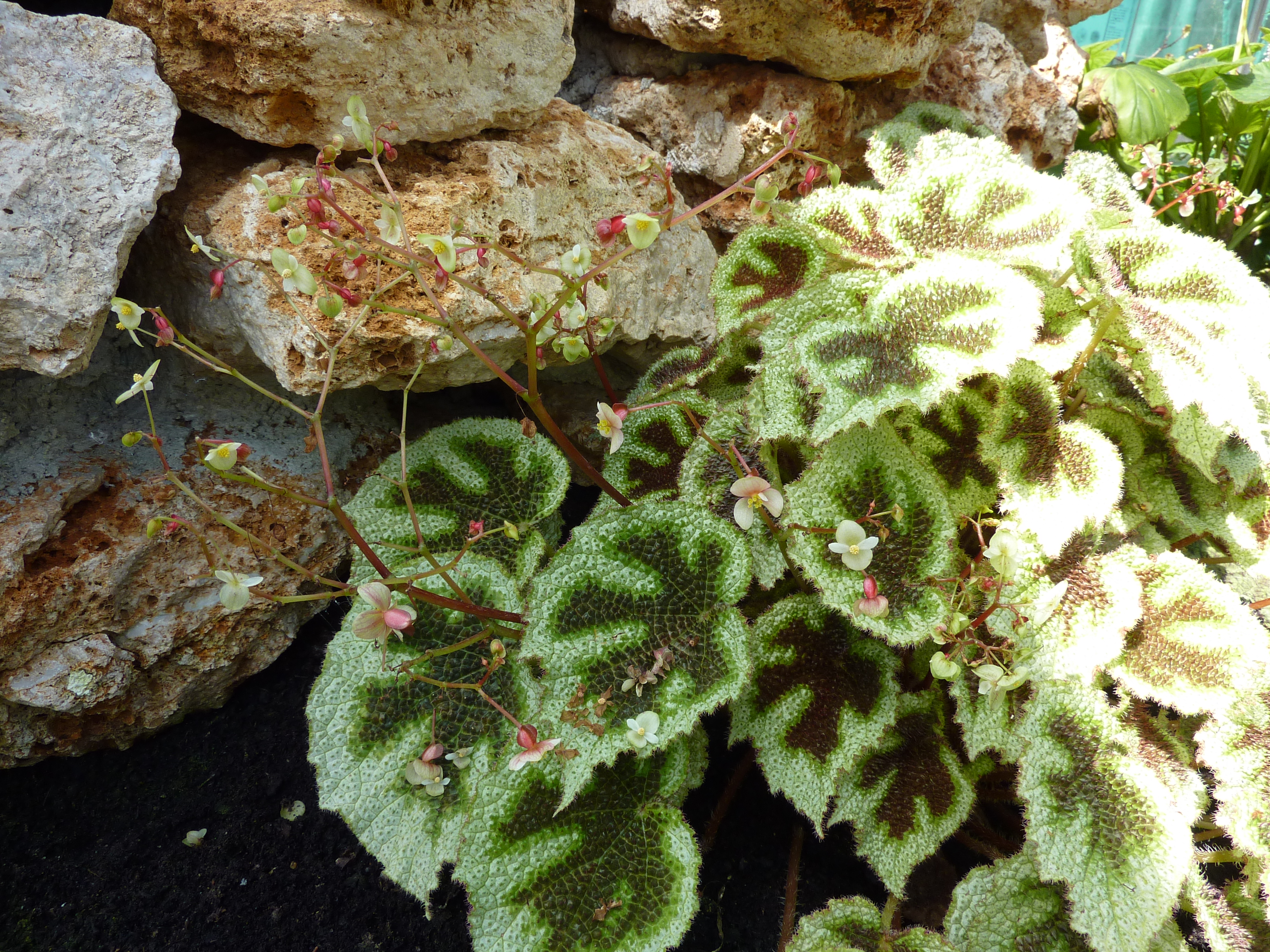

Scientific classification
- Kingdom: Plantae
- Clade: Tracheophytes
- Clade: Angiosperms
- Clade: Eudicots
- Clade: Rosids
- Order: Cucurbitales
- Family: Begoniaceae
- Genus: Begonia
- Species: B. masoniana

Binomial name
- Begonia masoniana Irmsch. ex Ziesenh.

= Begonia masoniana =

Species of flowering plant

Begonia masoniana, the iron cross begonia, is a species of plant in the family Begoniaceae, native to southern China and northern Vietnam. It was originally described from cultivated plants of unknown origin and was only much later rediscovered in the wild.

== Description ==
It is a rhizomatous perennial begonia growing to 0.5 metres (20 in), bearing large, asymmetrical, textured green leaves covered in reddish hairs, with a prominent dark brown pattern in the centre of each leaf, reminiscent of the German Iron Cross. It produces small white flowers in erect panicles, but is cultivated mainly for its foliage effect. In temperate regions it must be grown under glass, or in a completely frost-free environment. Not to be confused with the similar looking species Begonia variegata, from Vietnam. Although sometimes (incorrectly) considered a Rex begonia, this species is classified in the related section Coelocentrum.

This plant has gained the Royal Horticultural Society's Award of Garden Merit.

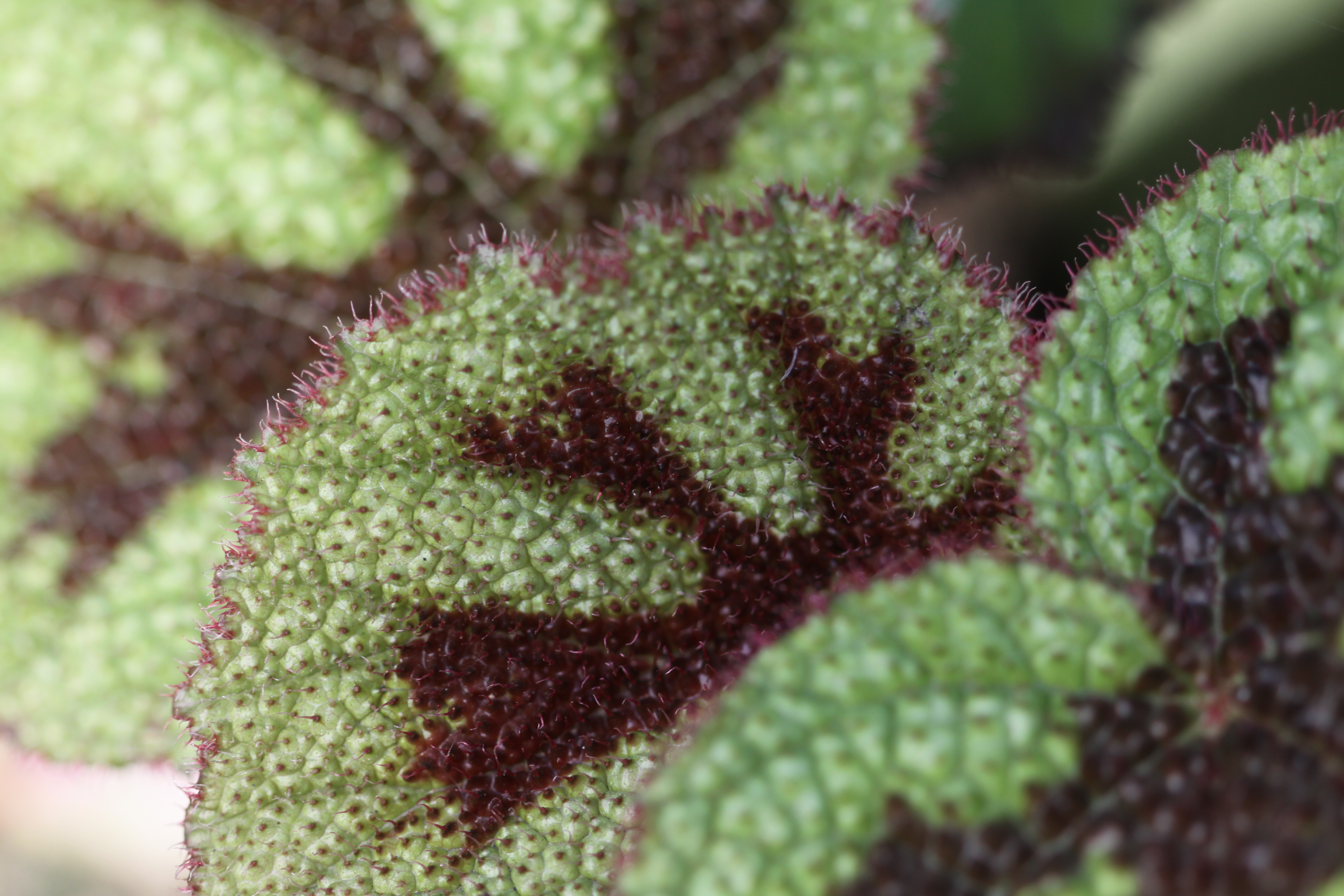
leaves closeup with red trichomes

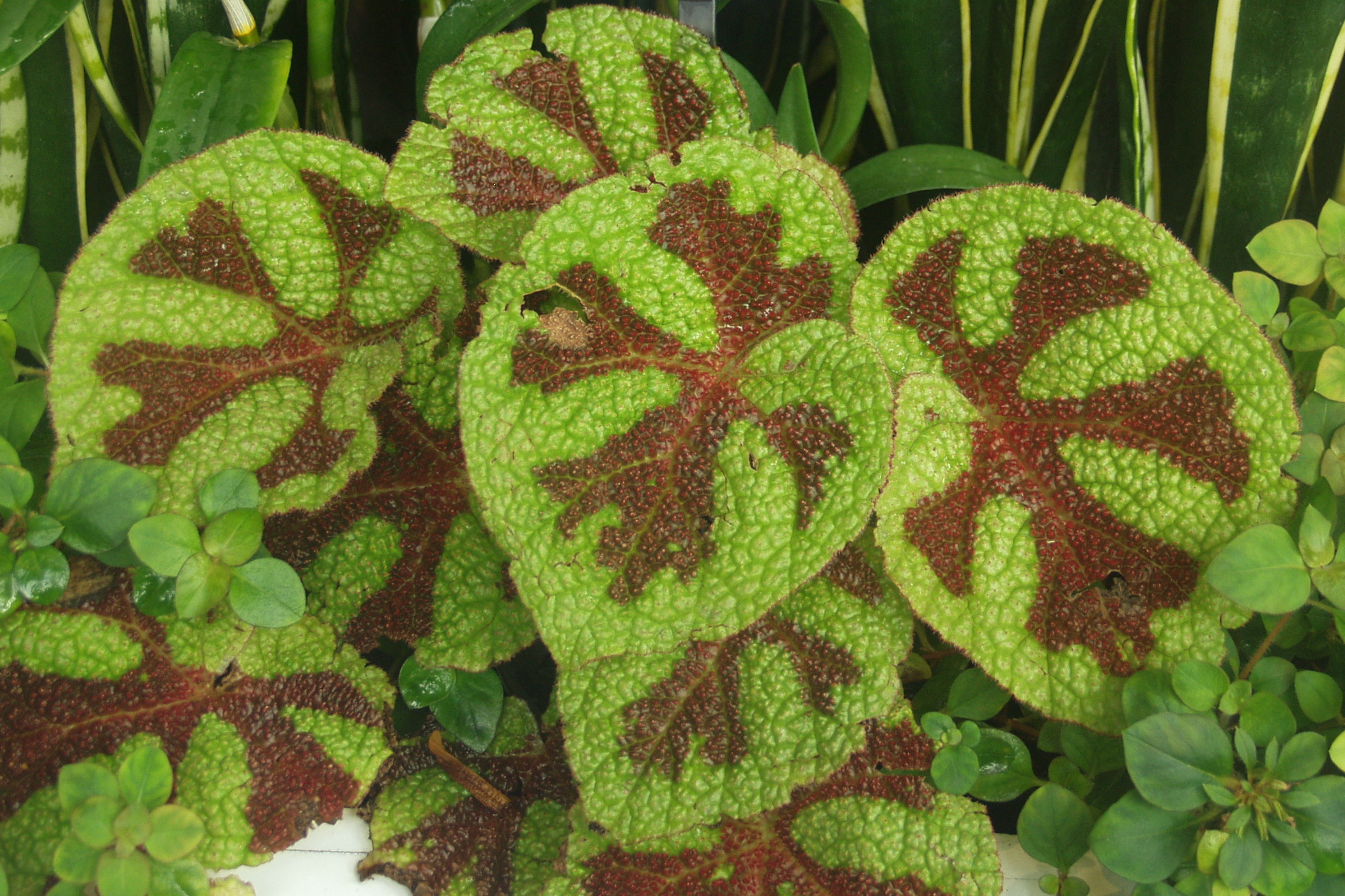
Plants

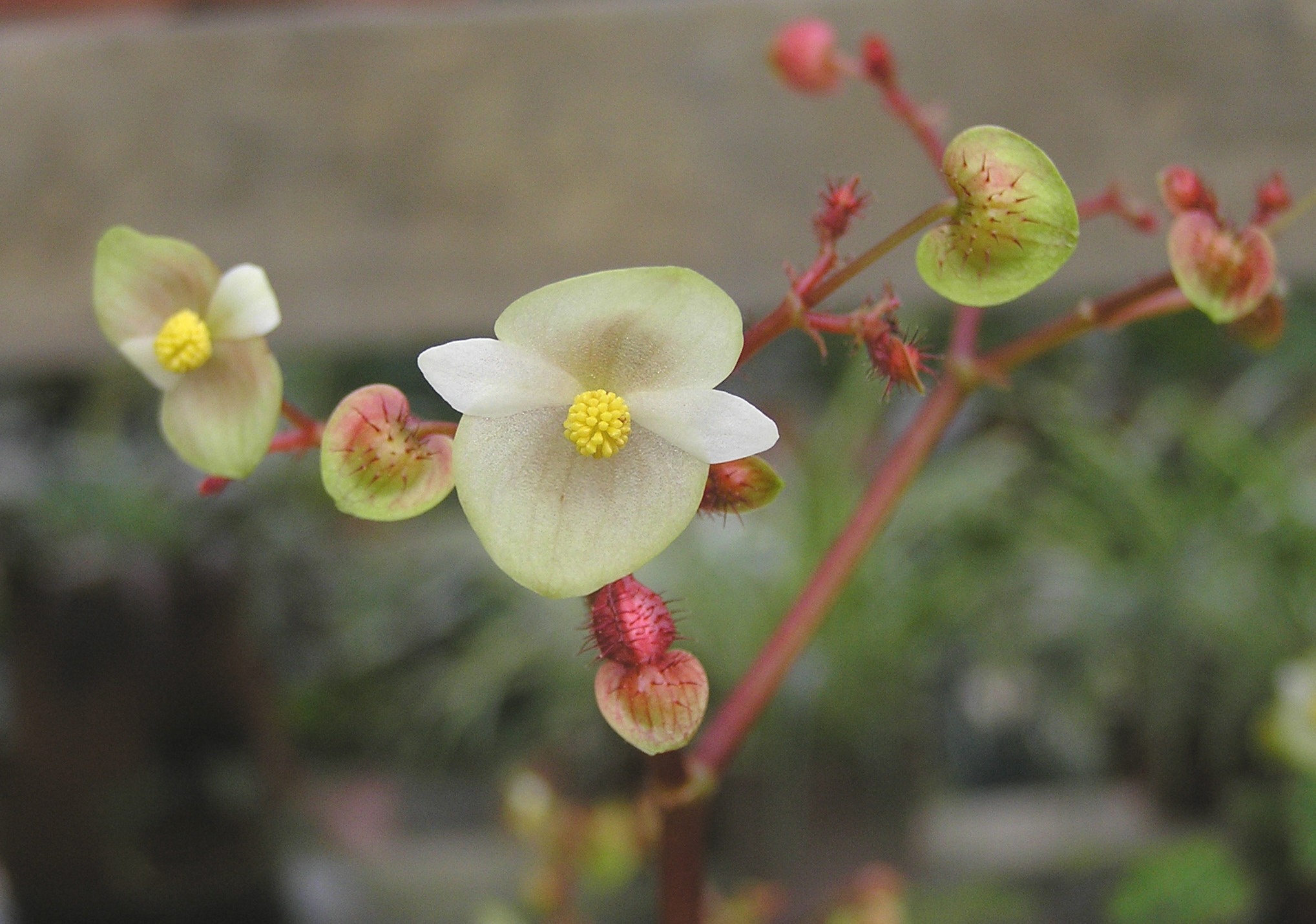
Flowers
