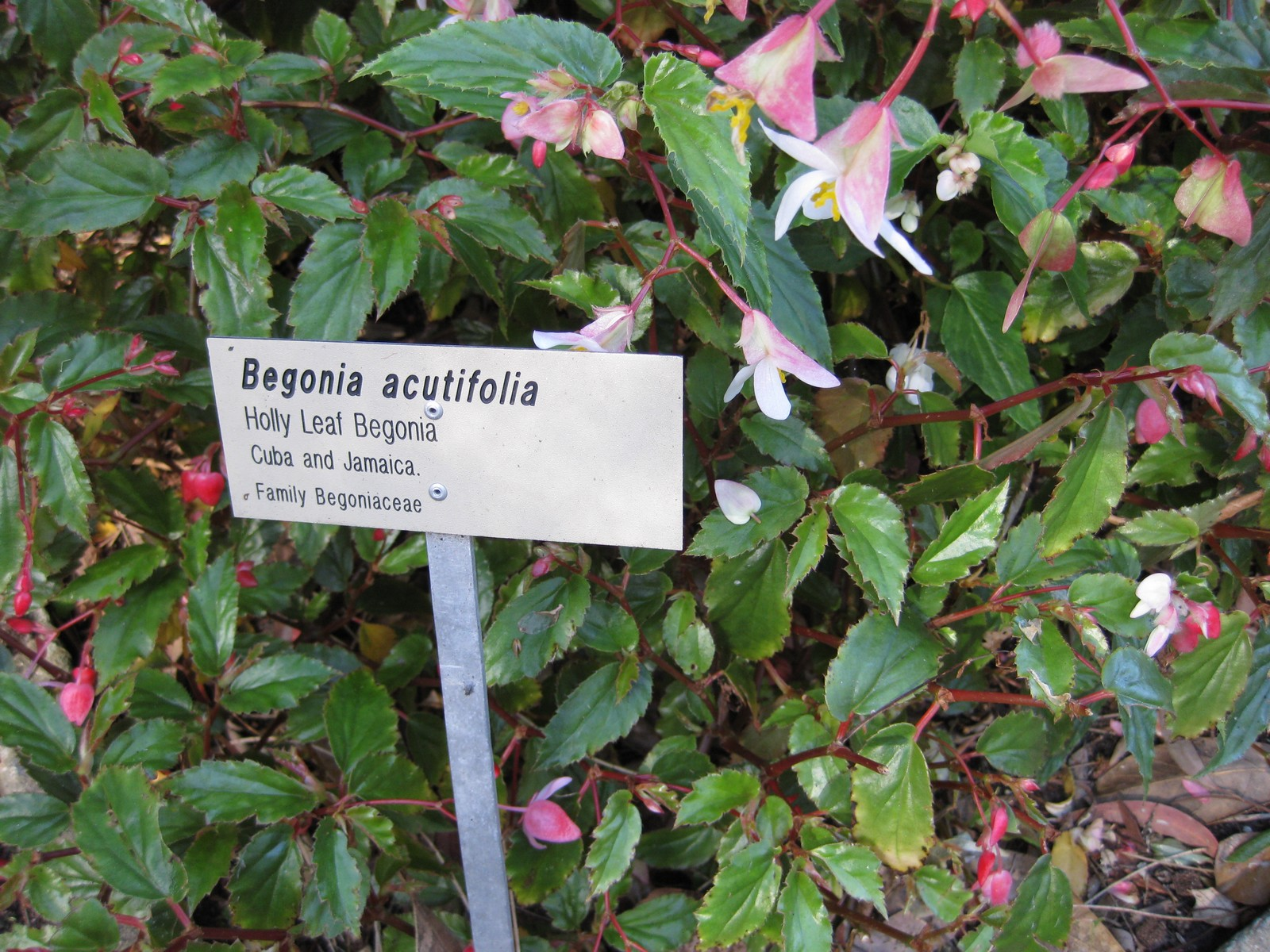
- At the Royal Botanic Garden, Sydney

Scientific classification
- Kingdom: Plantae
- Clade: Tracheophytes
- Clade: Angiosperms
- Clade: Eudicots
- Clade: Rosids
- Order: Cucurbitales
- Family: Begoniaceae
- Genus: Begonia
- Species: B. acutifolia

Binomial name
- Begonia acutifolia Jacq.

Synonyms
- Begonia acuminata Dryand.; Begonia hamiltoniana Lehm.; Platycentrum hamiltonianum Miq.; Tittelbachia hamiltoniana (Miq.) Regel

= Begonia acutifolia =

Species of flowering plant

Begonia acutifolia, the holly-leaf begonia, is a species of flowering plant in the family Begoniaceae, native to Cuba and Jamaica, and introduced to Saint Helena. Shade tolerant, it is kept as a house plant, or outside in USDA hardiness zone 9b or warmer.
