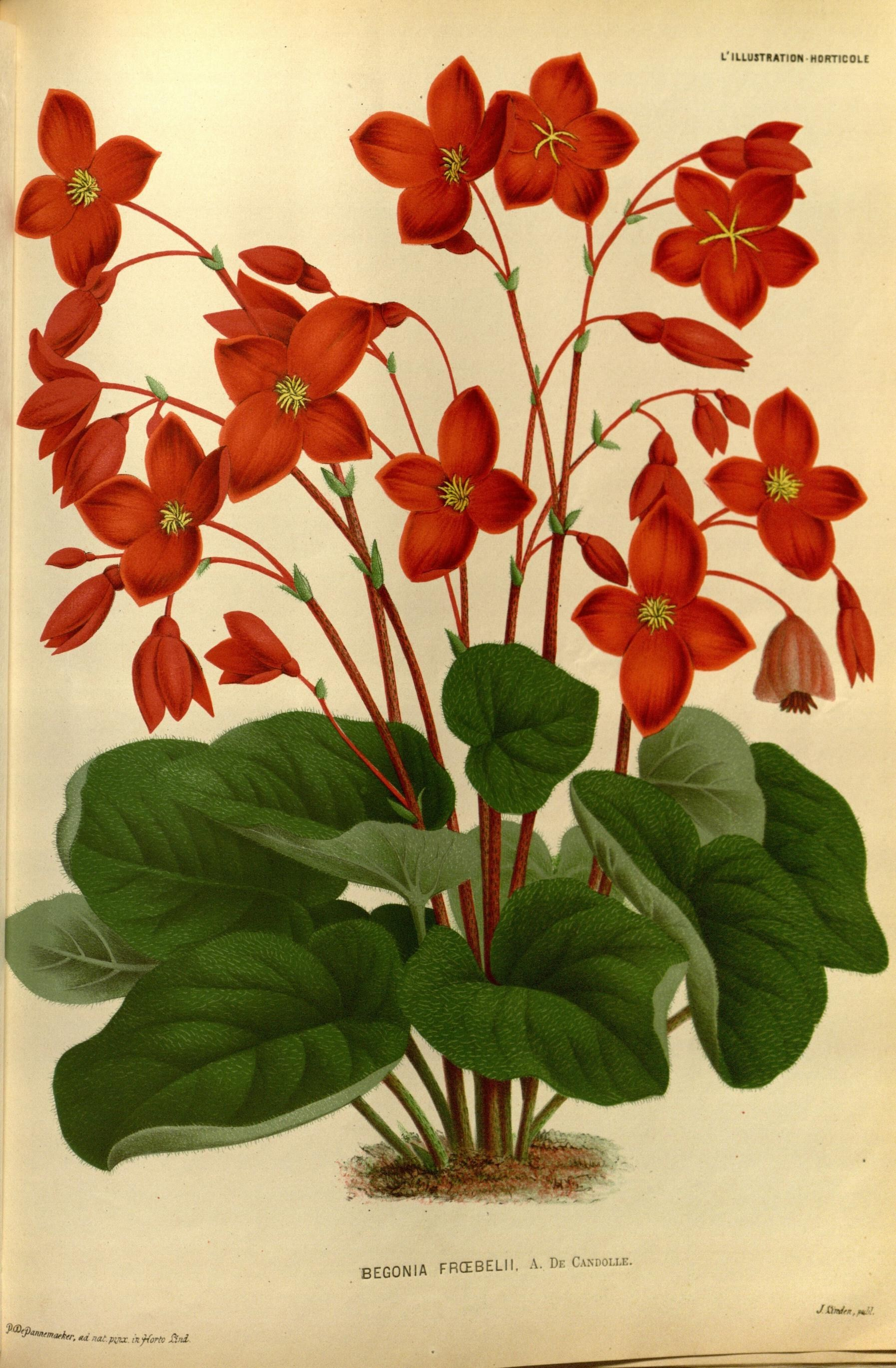

Conservation status
- Near Threatened (IUCN 3.1)

Scientific classification
- Kingdom: Plantae
- Clade: Tracheophytes
- Clade: Angiosperms
- Clade: Eudicots
- Clade: Rosids
- Order: Cucurbitales
- Family: Begoniaceae
- Genus: Begonia
- Species: B. froebelii

Binomial name
- Begonia froebelii A.DC.

= Begonia froebelii =

Species of flowering plant

Begonia froebelii is a species of plant in the family Begoniaceae. It is endemic to Ecuador. Its natural habitats are subtropical or tropical dry forests and subtropical or tropical moist montane forests. It is threatened by habitat loss.
