= Begonia giganticaulis =

Scientific classification
- Kingdom: Plantae
- Clade: Tracheophytes
- Clade: Angiosperms
- Clade: Eudicots
- Clade: Rosids
- Order: Cucurbitales
- Family: Begoniaceae
- Genus: Begonia
- Species: B. giganticaulis

Binomial name
- Begonia giganticaulis D.K.Tian & W.G.Wang

Species of plant

Begonia giganticaulis is a tree-like Begonia species (family Begoniaceae) recently discovered in Tibet. It is believed to be the tallest known Begonia species at 3.6 m (12 ft) in height, and a basal diameter of 12 cm (4.7 in). The team, headed by Daike Tian discovered it in Medog County, Tibet on 10 September 2020. Its main floristic difference is that the male flowers have six tepals as against the four tepals found in most Begonias. The simple, entire leaves are like those of myrtle and privet. It is considered endangered because it is estimated there are less than one thousand adult plants in its known range. While most of Tibet has an alpine climate, Medog County is a subtropical valley protected by high mountains.
