= Begonia amphioxus =

Scientific classification
- Kingdom: Plantae
- Clade: Tracheophytes
- Clade: Angiosperms
- Clade: Eudicots
- Clade: Rosids
- Order: Cucurbitales
- Family: Begoniaceae
- Genus: Begonia
- Species: B. amphioxus

Binomial name
- Begonia amphioxus Sands

Species of plant

Begonia amphioxus is a species of flowering plant in the family Begoniaceae, section Petermannia, native to Sabah state, Malaysia. There it is found growing in light shade on limestone, either at the base of cliffs or on top of outcrops. A shrub reaching 40 cm (16 in), its upright peltate leaves are 5 to 12 cm (2 to 5 in) long, lance-shaped and pointed at both ends. The highly ornamental leaves are olive to mid-green, with red spots and a red border around the margin.
