= Begonia darthvaderiana =

Scientific classification
- Kingdom: Plantae
- Clade: Tracheophytes
- Clade: Angiosperms
- Clade: Eudicots
- Clade: Rosids
- Order: Cucurbitales
- Family: Begoniaceae
- Genus: Begonia
- Species: B. darthvaderiana

Binomial name
- Begonia darthvaderiana C.W.Lin & C.I Peng

Species of flowering plant

Begonia darthvaderiana is a species of flowering plant native to Borneo, where it grows in deep shade in the rainforest interior. It occurs in Sarawak, where its range extends to Lubok Antu District and Kapit District. It has black leaves and red flowers, and was first scientifically described in 2014.

== Habitat and range ==
=== Habitat ===
B. darthvaderiana grows in deep shade in the rainforest interior.

=== Range ===
B. darthvaderiana is native to Borneo. It occurs in Sarawak, where its range extends to Lubok Antu District and Kapit District.

== Taxonomy ==
=== Species nova ===
B. darthvaderiana was first described in 2014.

=== Specific epithet ===
B. darthvaderiana's specific epithet is a reference to Star Wars character Darth Vader; B. darthvaderiana has black leaves and red flowers, which are reminiscent of the black and red colour scheme of Darth Vader in the Star Wars film franchise.

=== Classification ===
Begonia is a diverse genus; it is one of the ten largest genera of flowering plants. Bergonia species are classified into different sections. B. darthvaderiana belongs to Begonia sect. Petermannia.
