= Begonia peltatifolia =

Conservation status
- Endangered (IUCN 3.1)

Scientific classification
- Kingdom: Plantae
- Clade: Tracheophytes
- Clade: Angiosperms
- Clade: Eudicots
- Clade: Rosids
- Order: Cucurbitales
- Family: Begoniaceae
- Genus: Begonia
- Species: B. peltatifolia

Binomial name
- Begonia peltatifolia H.L.Li

Species of plant

Begonia peltatifolia, the shieldleaf begonia, is a species of plant in the family Begoniaceae. It is a rhizomatous geophyte endemic to Hainan in southern China. It grows on limestone rocks and broad-leaved forests.
