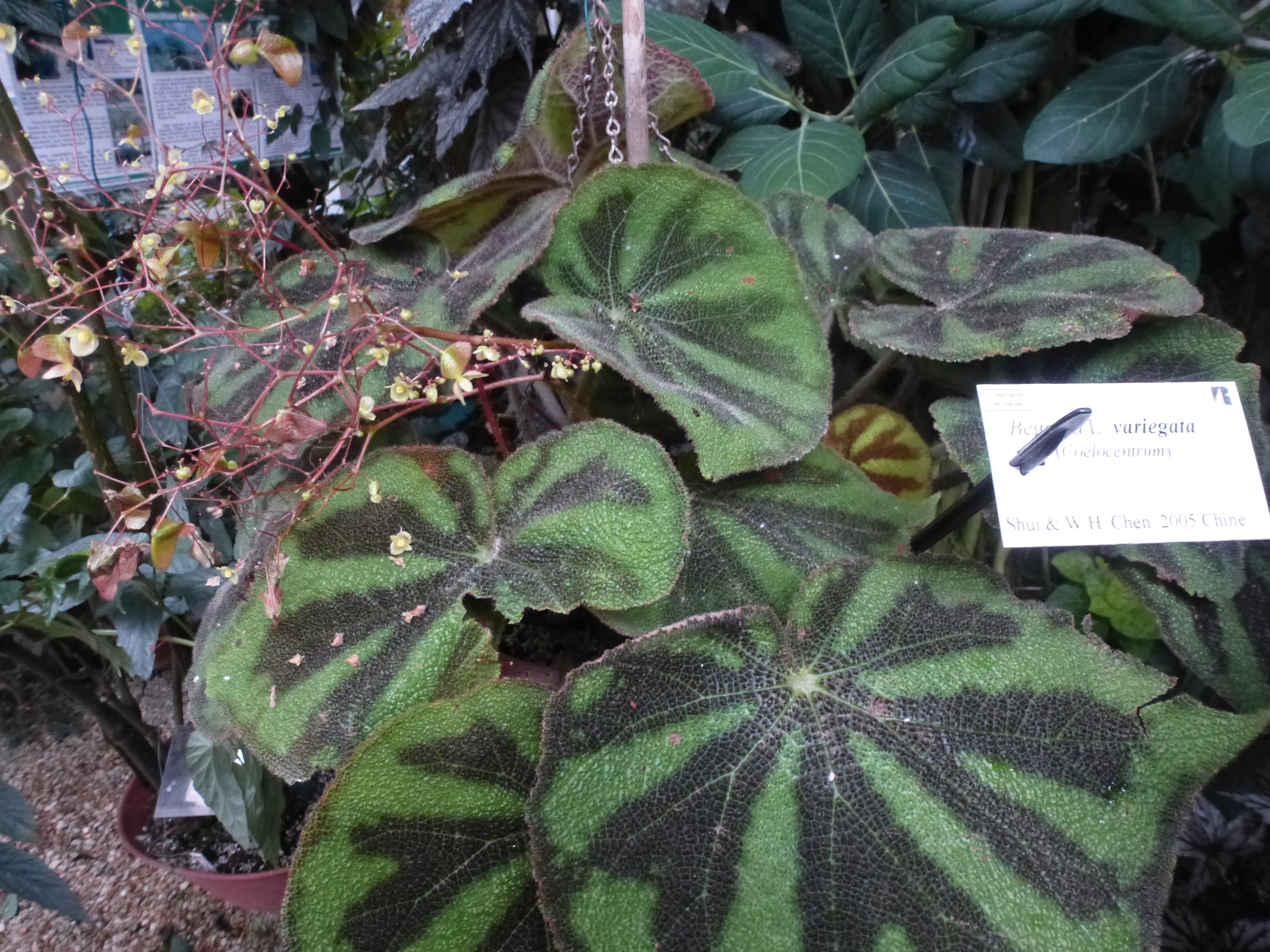

Scientific classification
- Kingdom: Plantae
- Clade: Tracheophytes
- Clade: Angiosperms
- Clade: Eudicots
- Clade: Rosids
- Order: Cucurbitales
- Family: Begoniaceae
- Genus: Begonia
- Species: B. variegata

Binomial name
- Begonia variegata Y.M.Shui & W.H.Chen

= Begonia variegata =

Species of flowering plant

Begonia variegata is a species of Begonia found in Vietnam.
