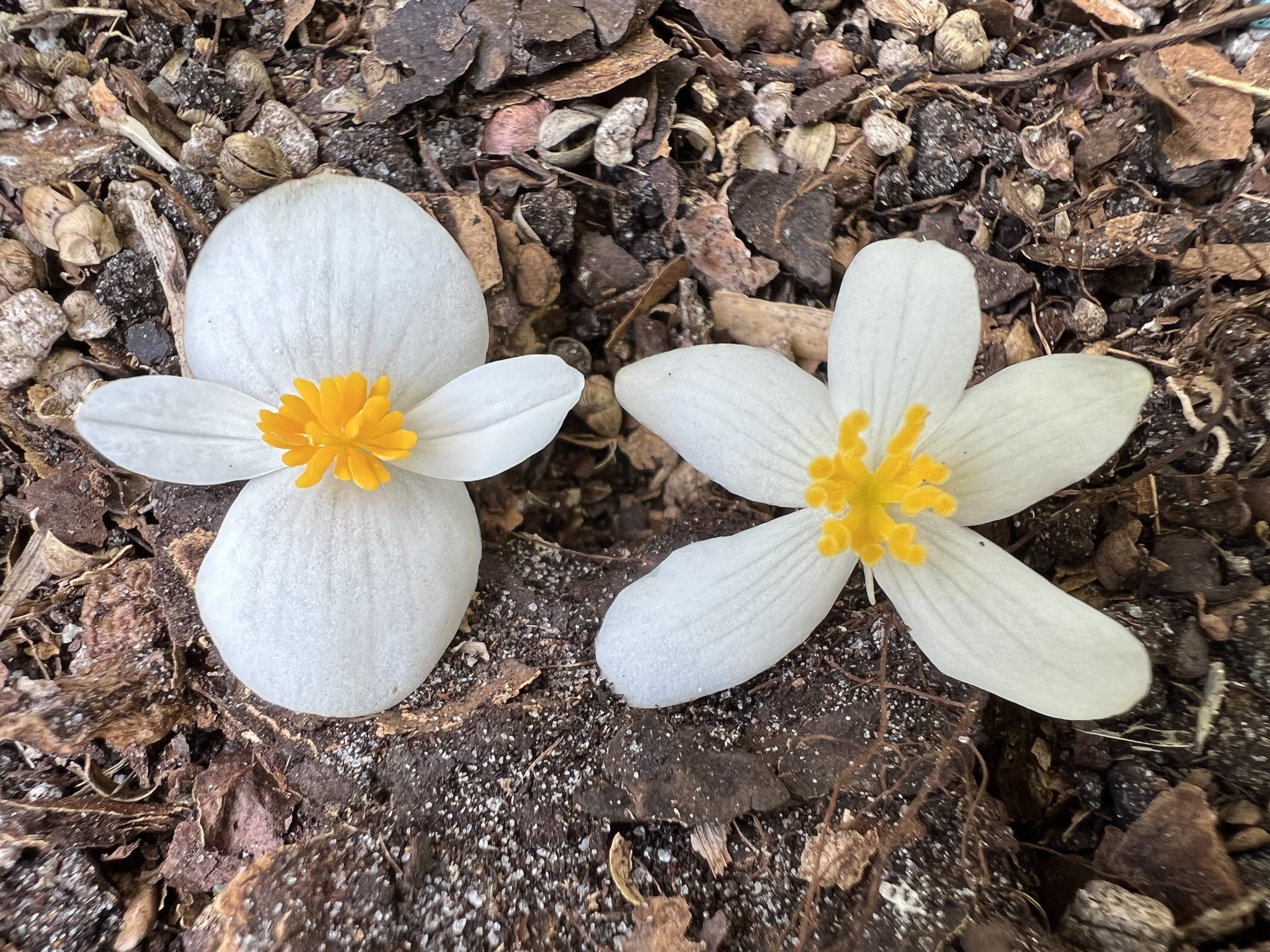
- Male (left) and female (right) Begonia obliqua flowers
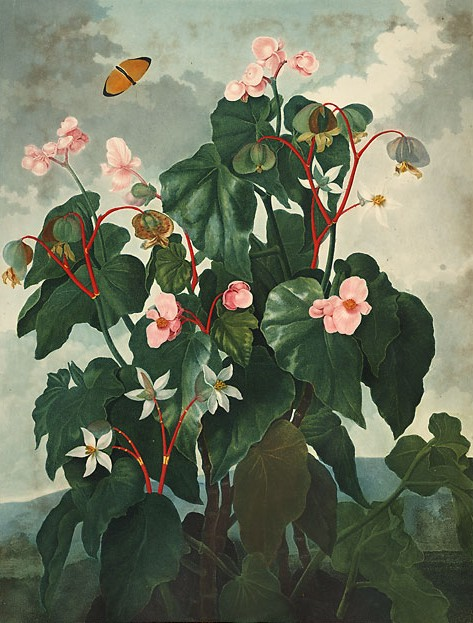
- Illustration

Scientific classification
- Kingdom: Plantae
- Clade: Tracheophytes
- Clade: Angiosperms
- Clade: Eudicots
- Clade: Rosids
- Order: Cucurbitales
- Family: Begoniaceae
- Genus: Begonia
- Species: B. obliqua

Binomial name
- Begonia obliqua L.

= Begonia obliqua =

Species of flowering plant

Begonia obliqua is the type species of the genus Begonia and the species to which Plumier first gave the name Begonia. It is native to Martinique, Dominica, and Guadeloupe.

The name has been misapplied to Begonia grandis by Thunberg, to Begonia minor by L'Héritier, and to Begonia fischeri by Vellozo.
