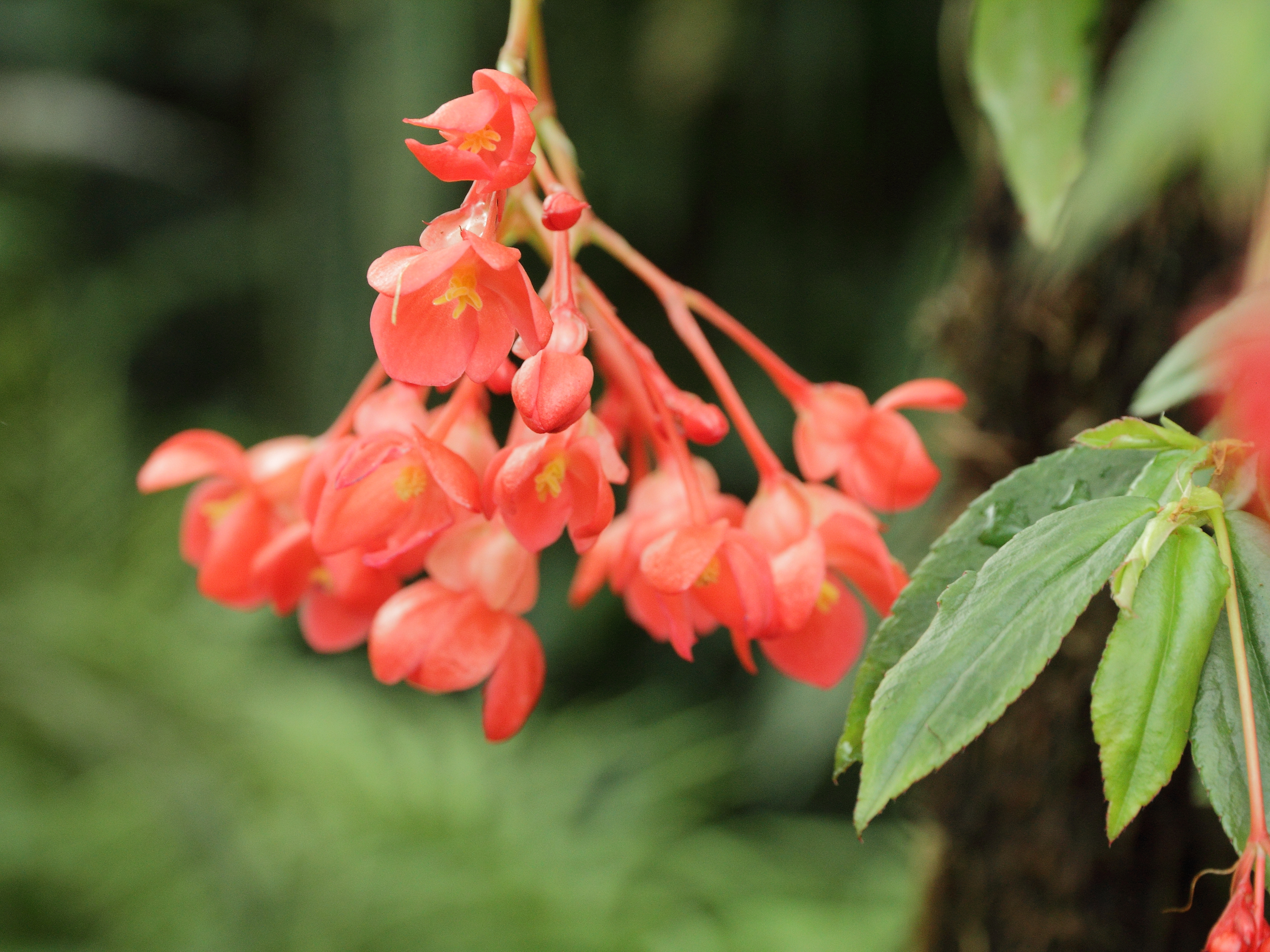
- Begonia foliosa var. miniata

Scientific classification
- Kingdom: Plantae
- Clade: Tracheophytes
- Clade: Angiosperms
- Clade: Eudicots
- Clade: Rosids
- Order: Cucurbitales
- Family: Begoniaceae
- Genus: Begonia
- Species: B. foliosa

Binomial name
- Begonia foliosa Kunth

Synonyms
- Several, including: Begonia elegans Kunth, 1825; Begonia fuchsioides Hook.; Casparya elegans Klotzsch, 1854

= Begonia foliosa =

Species of flowering plant

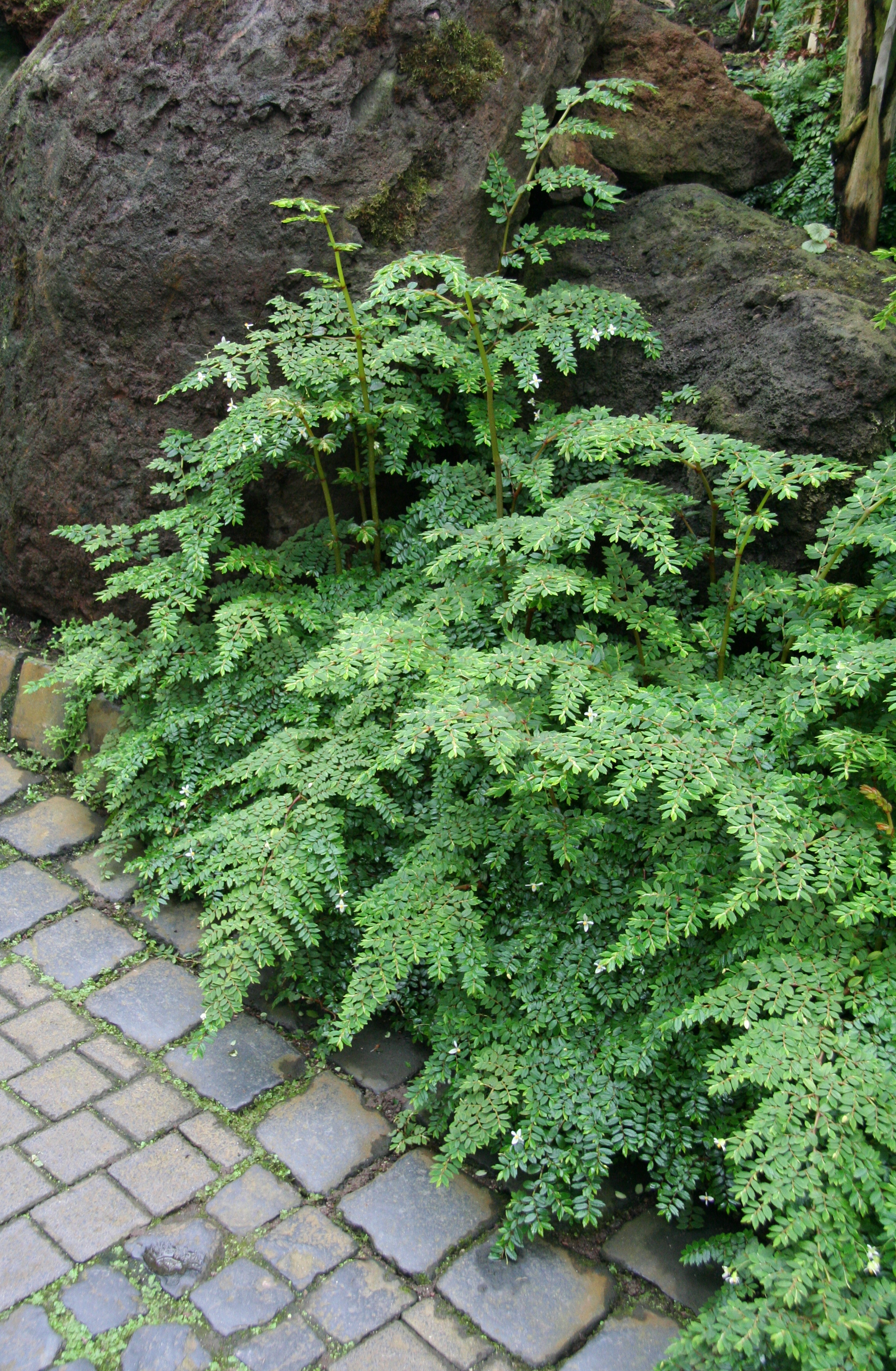
Foliage

Begonia foliosa is a species of flowering plant in the family Begoniaceae, native to Colombia and Venezuela. It is a shrublike begonia growing to 1 metre (3.3 ft), bearing succulent, pendent stems 45 centimetres (18 in) long, thickly clothed with glossy oval green leaves, and producing panicles of small white flowers. The variety commonly cultivated is B. foliosa var. miniata with pink or red flowers. As it does not tolerate temperatures below 0 °C (32 °F), in temperate regions it requires winter protection.

The variety B. foliosa var. miniata has gained the Royal Horticultural Society's Award of Garden Merit.
