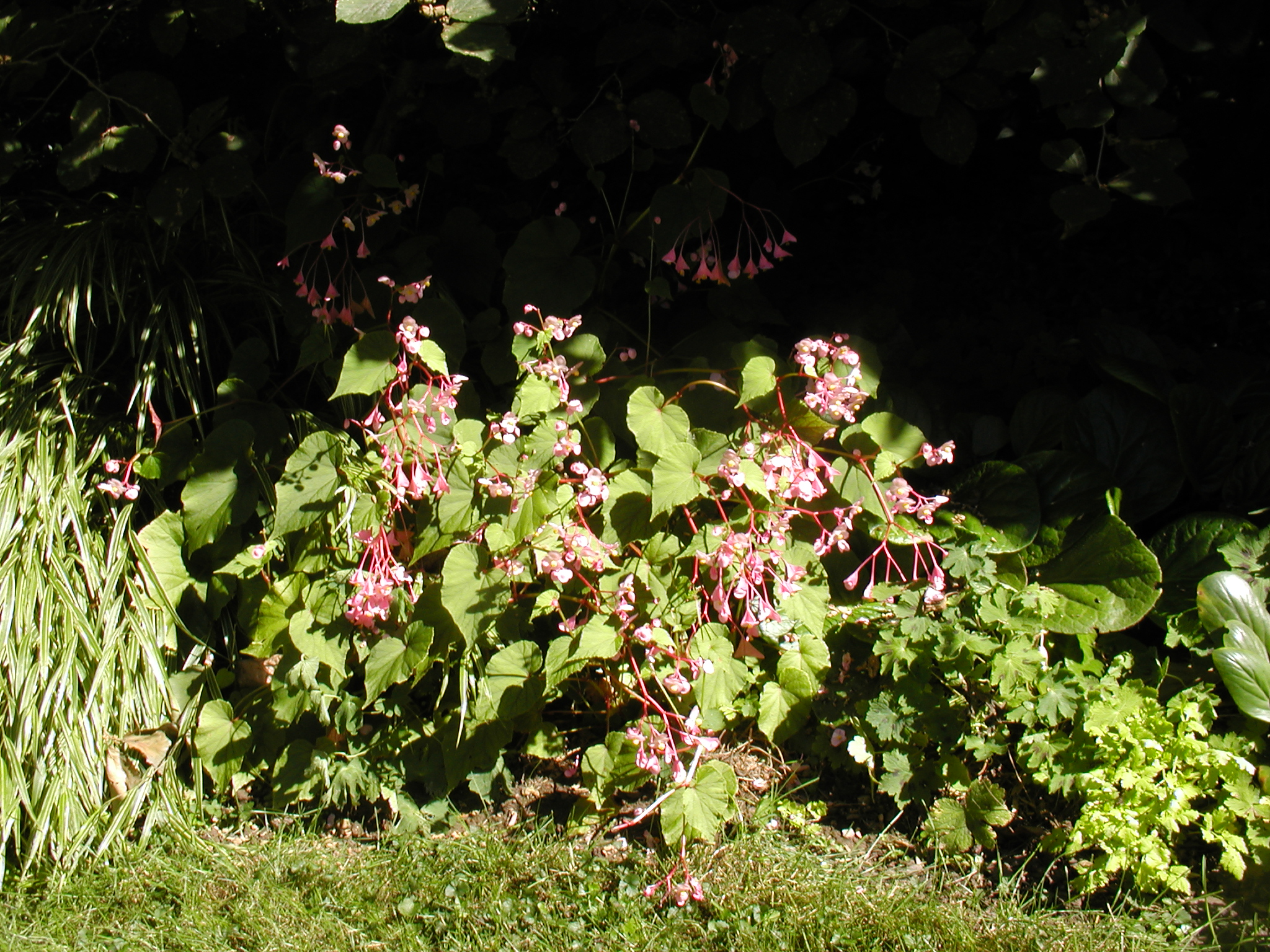
- Hardy begonia

Scientific classification
- Kingdom: Plantae
- Clade: Tracheophytes
- Clade: Angiosperms
- Clade: Eudicots
- Clade: Rosids
- Order: Cucurbitales
- Family: Begoniaceae
- Genus: Begonia
- Species: B. grandis

Binomial name
- Begonia grandis Dryand.

= Begonia grandis =

Species of flowering plant

Begonia grandis, the hardy begonia, is a species of flowering plant in the family Begoniaceae. This herbaceous perennial has alternate, simple leaves on arching stems. The flowers are pink or white, borne in dichotomously branching cymes from late summer through fall in USDA U.S. Hardiness Zone 7. As the common name "hardy begonia" implies, it is winter hardy in some temperate regions.

It can overwinter well in hardiness zone 9a in southwestern Japan as tuberous roots or bulbils (bulbils are formed in axils). Above-ground parts of this plant eventually die as temperature lowers. However, it is generally regarded as hardy to zones 5-6.

The varietIes Begonia grandis subsp. evansiana and Begonia grandis subsp. evansiana var. alba have gained the Royal Horticultural Society's Award of Garden Merit.

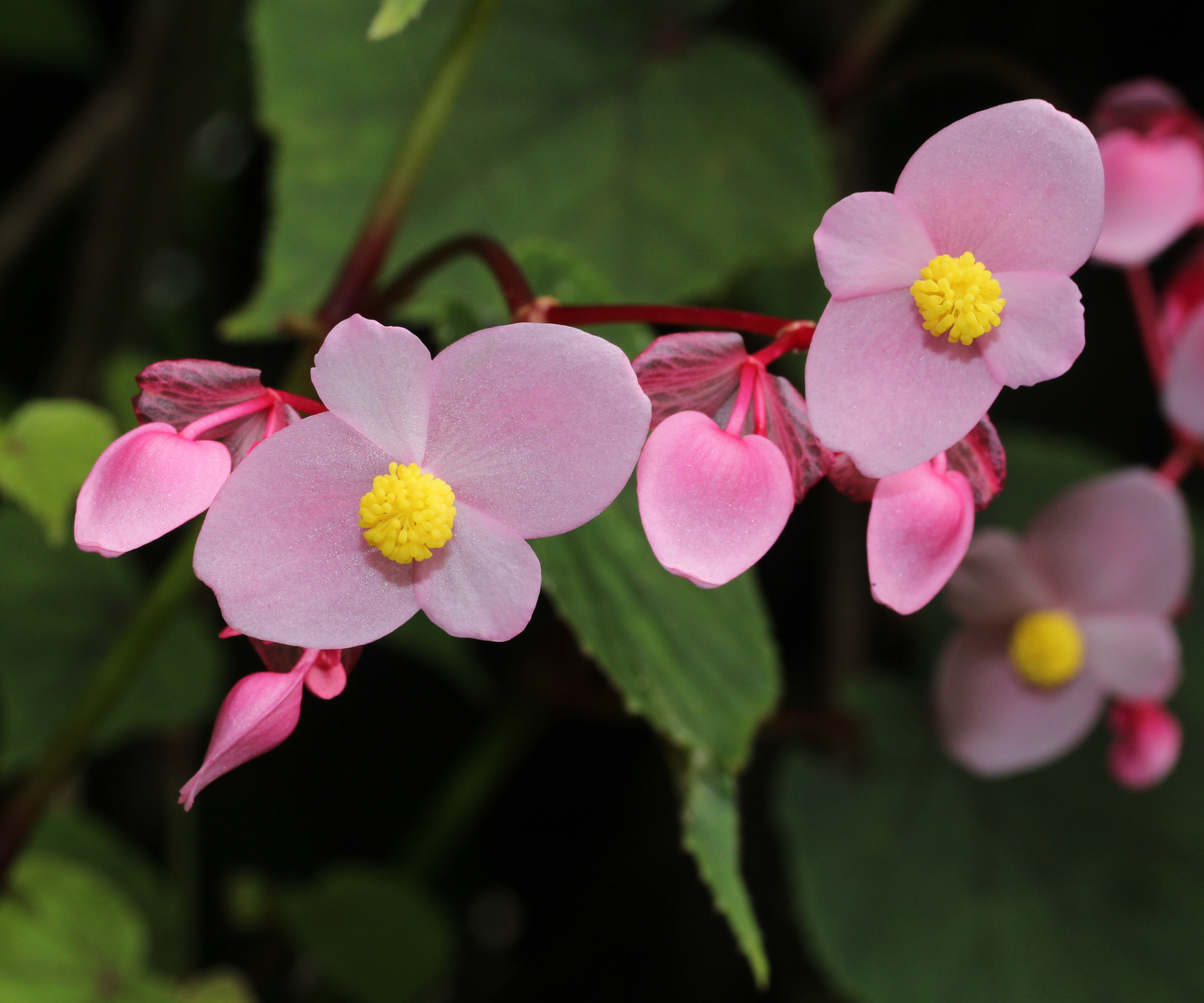
