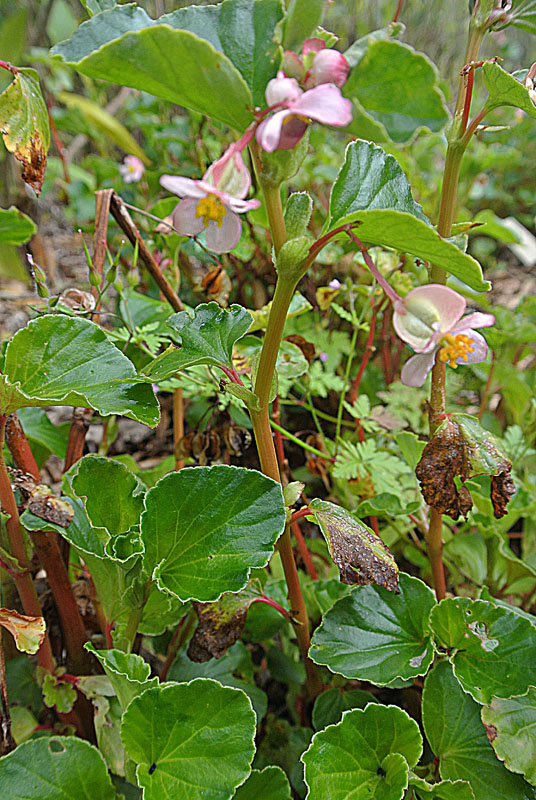

Scientific classification
- Kingdom: Plantae
- Clade: Tracheophytes
- Clade: Angiosperms
- Clade: Eudicots
- Clade: Rosids
- Order: Cucurbitales
- Family: Begoniaceae
- Genus: Begonia
- Species: B. cucullata

Binomial name
- Begonia cucullata Carl Ludwig Willdenow, 1805

Synonyms
- Begonia cucullata var. cucullata Begonia cucullifolia Begonia dispar Begonia nervosa Begonia paludicola Begonia semperflorens Begonia setaria

= Begonia cucullata =

Species of flowering plant "wax begonia"

Begonia cucullata, also known as clubbed begonia, is a species of the Begoniaceae that is native to South American countries of Argentina, Brazil, Paraguay, and Uruguay. A common garden plant and part of the section Begonia, it was described in 1805 by Carl Ludwig Willdenow (1765–1812). The specific epithet "cucullata" means "resembling a hood" or "hooded".

== Description ==
The plant is an upright growing, herbaceous perennial that has almost symmetrical succulent pale green to pale reddish brown leaves that are ovate, glabrous 4–8 cm long and 6 cm wide, with edged, glossy and toothed crenation. Grown as a groundcover, the flowers of the plant are red, pink or white that bloom in the summer or year-round in warmer places, and the fruits have three wings.

== Range ==
Native to South America, wax begonia is also found growing invasively in Florida, namely from the northern and central peninsula west to central panhandle, and also in Georgia. The plant may invade waysides, deforested areas, overgrazed pastureland, and wastelands.

Because they are such prolific seed producers, seeds are thought to be the primary way begonias spread when left unchecked. They can also root very easily, but this may not play much of a role under natural conditions.

== Cultivation ==
Older varieties prefer shade, though newer varieties tolerate both full sun and shade. Indoors, they can thrive in a south- or east-facing window, provided they are acclimated when their environment is changed.

== Varieties ==
Begonia × semperflorens-cultorum, marketed commercially as the wax begonia, is a hybrid of at least five species, including B. cucullata. The name wax begonia refers to the thick and waxy leaves of the group.

According to Catalog of Life (February 6, 2017) 6 and Kew Garden World Checklist, these varieties exist:

- Begonia cucullata var. cucullata
- Begonia cucullata var. hookeri (A.DC.) LBSm. & BGSchub. (1941)
- Begonia cucullata var. spatulata (G.Lodd. ex Haw.) Golding (1982)
- Begonia cucullata var. subcucullata (C.DC.)

According to Tropicos (February 6, 2017):

- Begonia cucullata var. arenosicola (C. DC.) LB Sm. & BG Schub.
- Begonia cucullata var. cucullata
- Begonia cucullata var. hookeri LB Sm. & BG Schub.
- Begonia cucullata var. sellowii A. DC.
- Begonia cucullata var. spatulata (Lodd.) Golding
- Begonia cucullata var. subcucullata (C. DC.) ined.

== Gallery ==
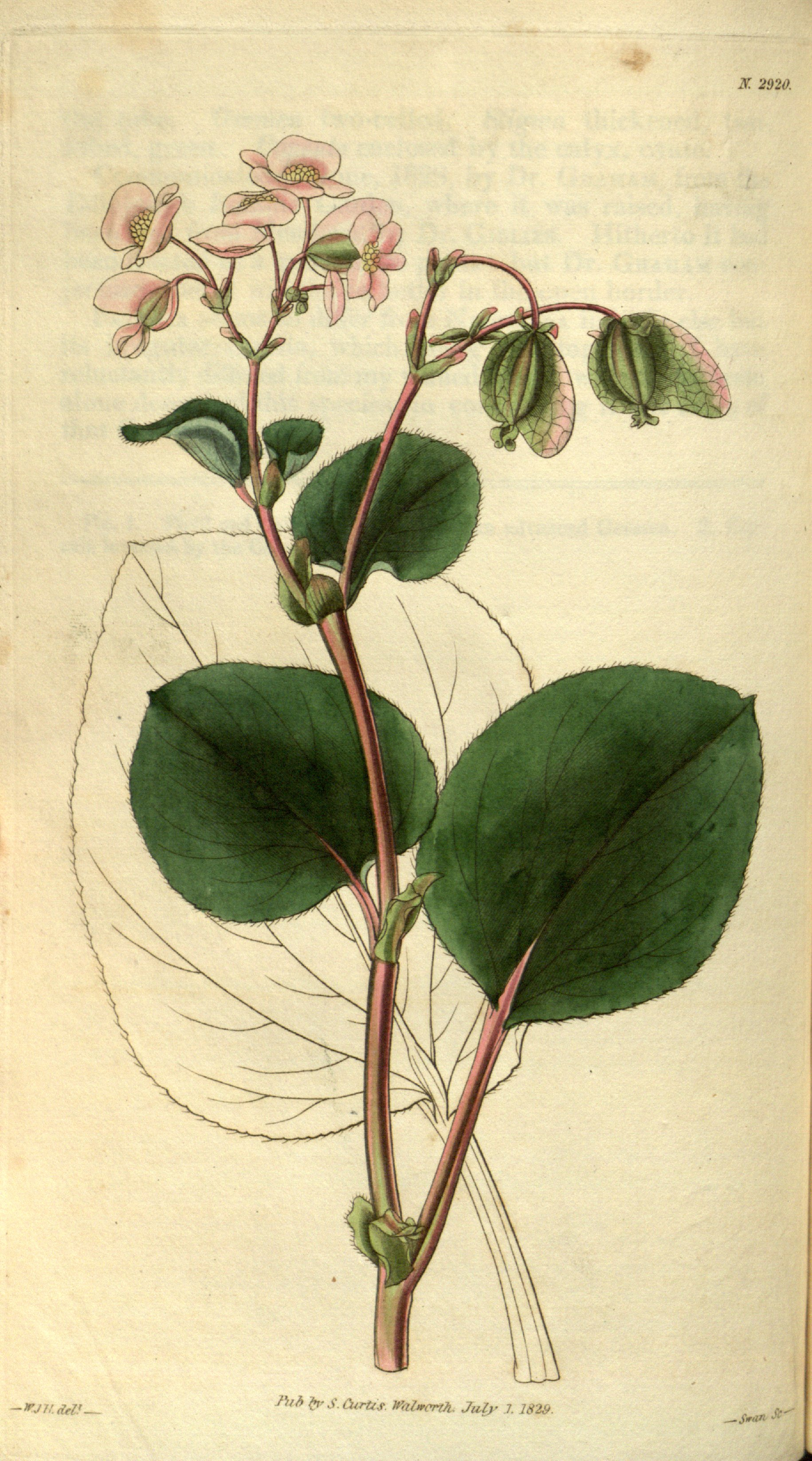
Botanical illustration

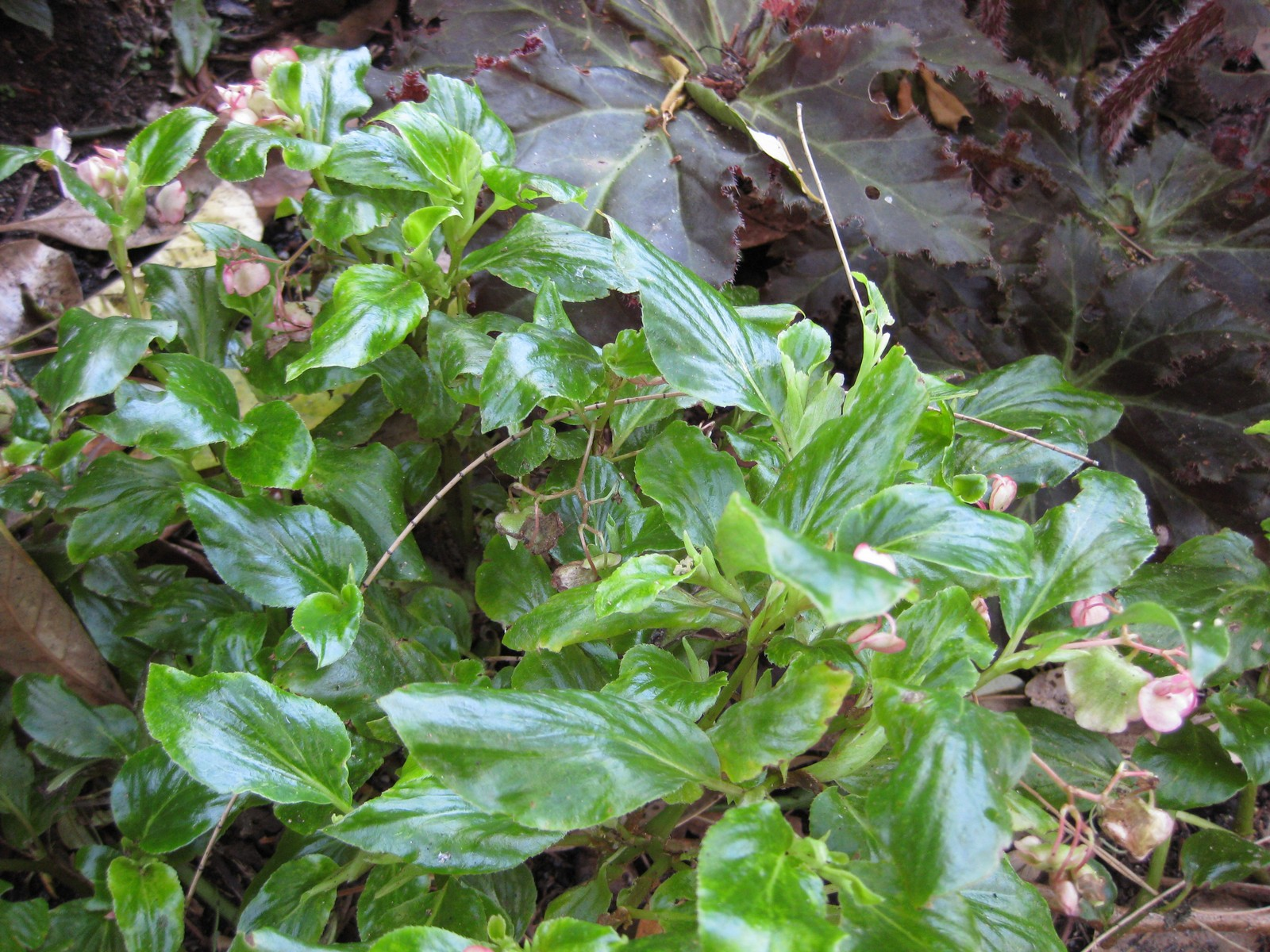
In natural habitat

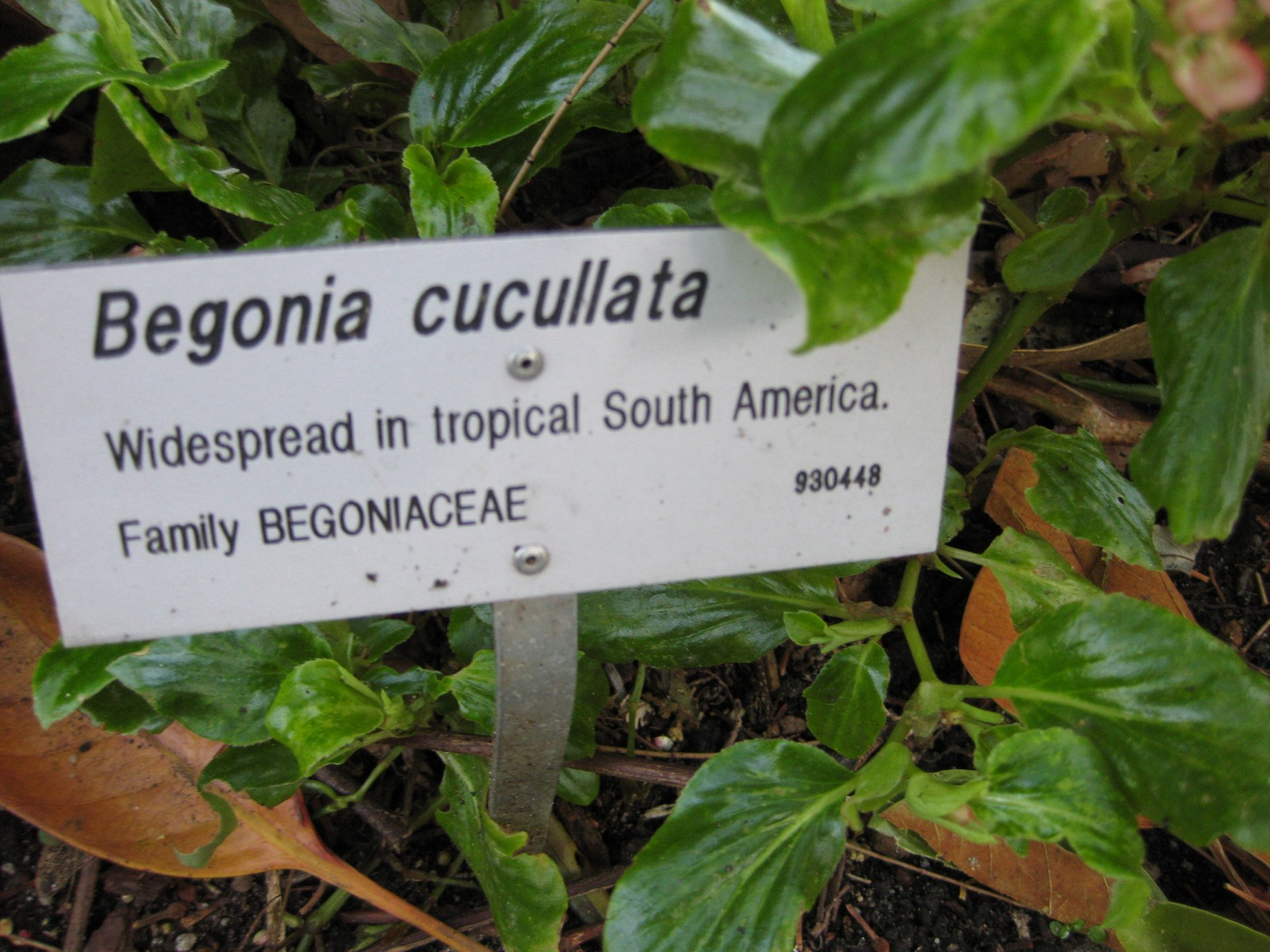
At a botanical garden

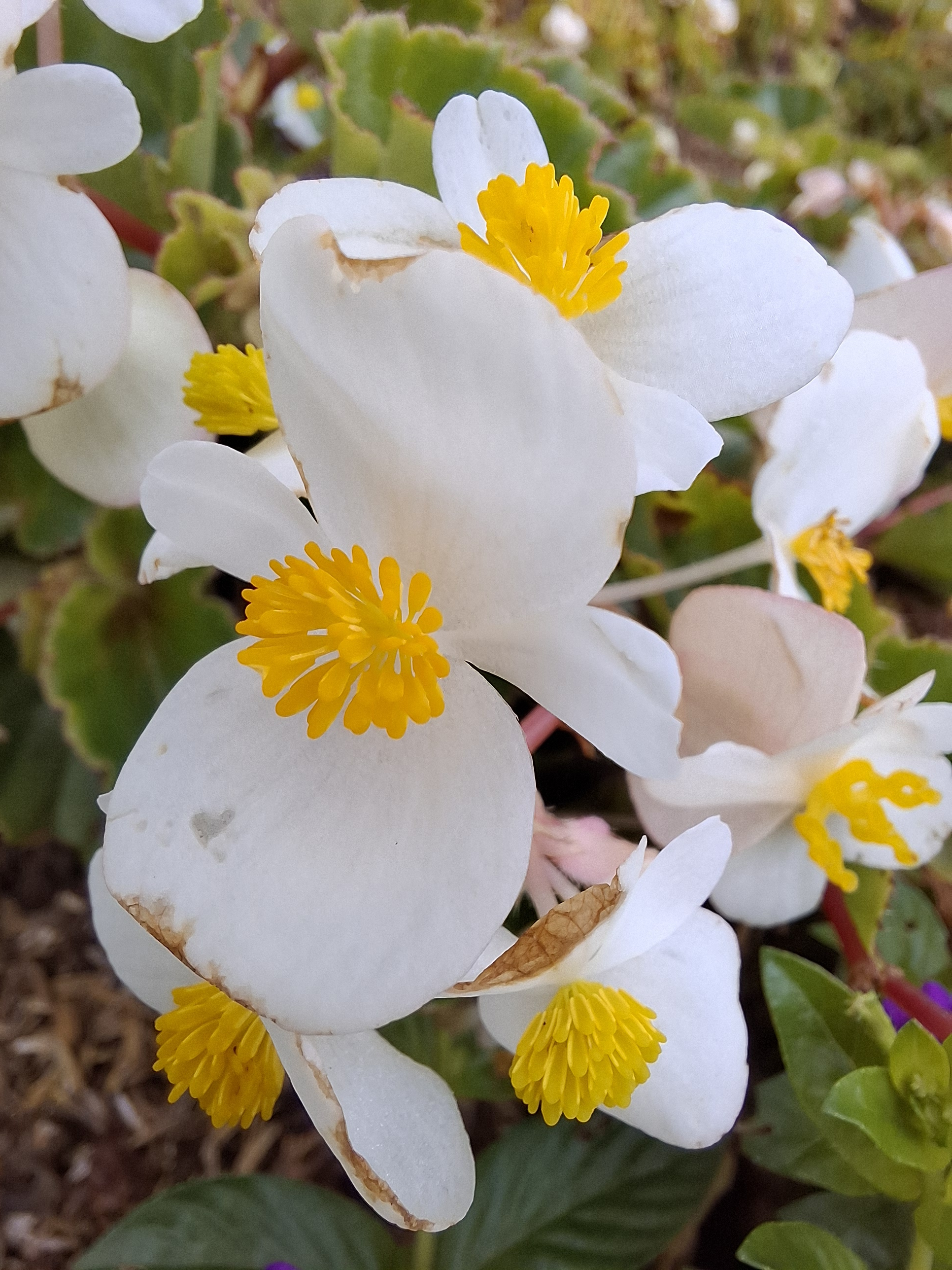
Flower in Indonesia
