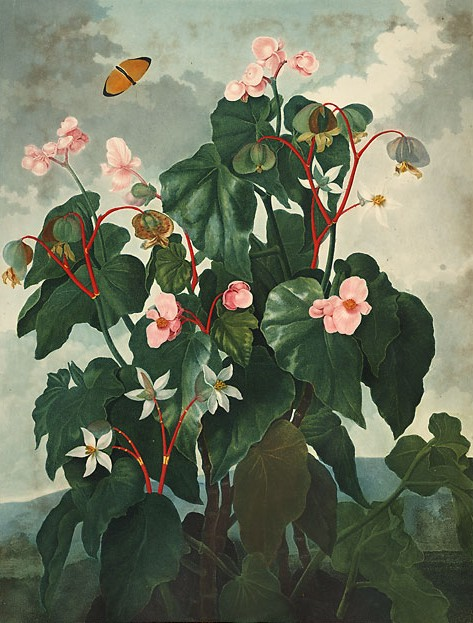
- Begonia obliqua

Scientific classification
- Kingdom: Plantae
- Clade: Tracheophytes
- Clade: Angiosperms
- Clade: Eudicots
- Clade: Rosids
- Order: Cucurbitales
- Family: Begoniaceae
- Genus: Begonia; L.

Type species
- Begonia obliqua L.

Species
- Main article: List of Begonia species
- Range of the genus Begonia

Synonyms
- List: Augustia Klotzsch; Barya Klotzsch; Begoniella Oliv.; Casparya Klotzsch; Cladomischus Klotzsch ex A.DC.; Cyathocnemis Klotzsch; Diploclinium Lindl.; Donaldia Klotzsch; Doratometra Klotzsch; Eupetalum Lindl.; Ewaldia Klotzsch; Falkea J.Koenig ex Steud.; Gaerdtia Klotzsch; Gireoudia Klotzsch; Gurltia Klotzsch; Haagea Klotzsch; Huszia Klotzsch; Isopteryx Klotzsch; Knesebeckia Klotzsch; Lauchea Klotzsch; Lepsia Klotzsch; Magnusia Klotzsch; Mezierea Gaudich.; Mitscherlichia Klotzsch; Moschkowitzia Klotzsch; Nephromischus Klotzsch; Petermannia Klotzsch; Pilderia Klotzsch; Platycentrum Klotzsch; Platyclinium T.Moore; Pritzelia Klotzsch; Putzeysia Klotzsch; Rachia Klotzsch; Reichenheimia Klotzsch; Riessia Klotzsch; Rossmannia Klotzsch; Sassea Klotzsch; Saueria Klotzsch; Scheidweileria Klotzsch; Semibegoniella C.DC.; Sphenanthera Hassk.; Steineria Klotzsch; Stibadotheca Klotzsch; Symbegonia Warb.; Tittelbachia Klotzsch; Trachelanthus Klotzsch; Trachelocarpus Müll.Berol.; Trendelenburgia Klotzsch; Trilomisa Raf.; Wageneria Klotzsch; Weilbachia Klotzsch & Oerst.

= Begonia =

Genus of perennial flowering plants

Begonia is a genus of perennial flowering plants in the family Begoniaceae. The genus contains more than 2,000 different plant species, distributed primarily across tropical and subtropical regions of Africa, Asia, and Central and South America, with Africa considered the center of origin. Some species are commonly grown indoors as ornamental houseplants in cooler climates, or cultivated outside in summertime for their bright colorful flowers, which have petals but no sepals.

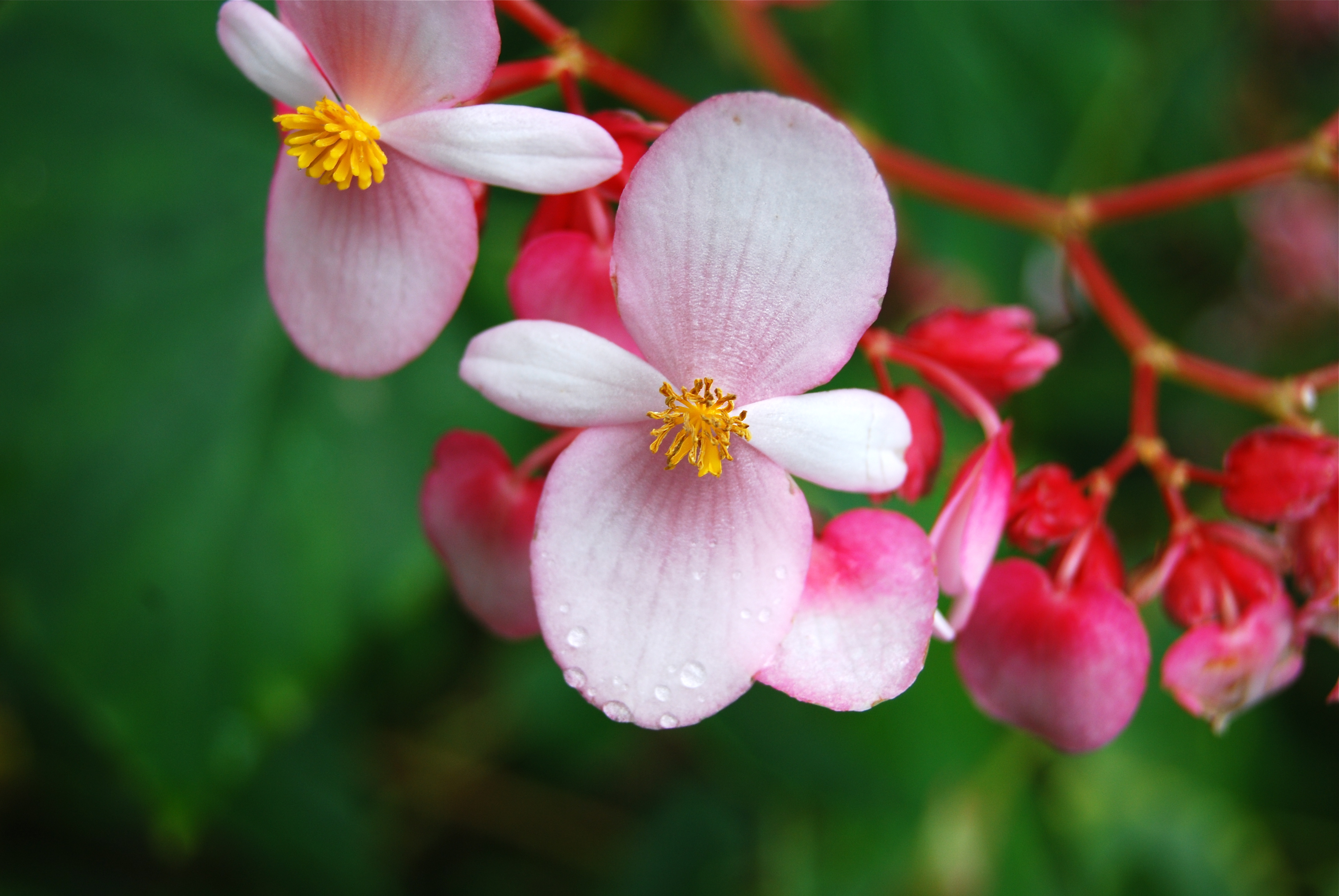
Pink flowering Begonia

== Description ==
With 2,000+ species, Begonia is one of the largest genera of flowering plants. The species are terrestrial (sometimes epiphytic) herbs or undershrubs, and occur in subtropical and tropical moist climates, in South and Central America, Africa, and southern Asia. Terrestrial species in the wild are commonly upright-stemmed, rhizomatous, or tuberous. The plants are monoecious, with unisexual male and female flowers occurring separately on the same plant; the male contains numerous stamens, and the female has a large inferior ovary and two to four branched or twisted stigmas. Flowers come in all colors other than blue, and range in size from tiny individual blossoms to blooms the size of dinner plates. In most species, the fruit is a winged capsule containing numerous minute seeds, although baccate fruits are also known. The leaves, which are often large and variously marked or variegated, are usually asymmetric such that their left side and right side are different sizes. The plants vary in size from less than a foot to the recently discovered Begonia giganticaulis which can exceed twelve feet (3.6 meters) in height.

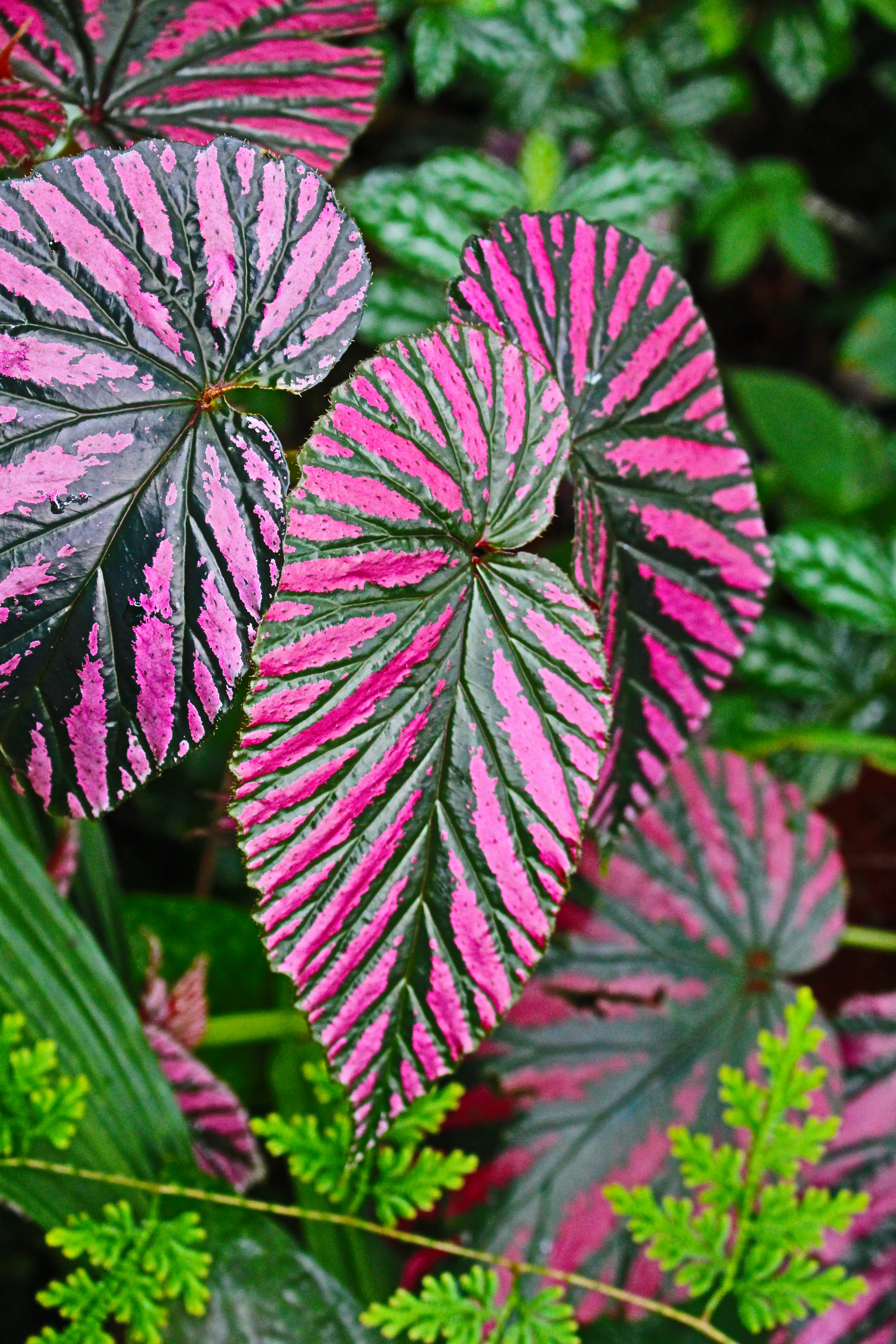
Begonia brevirimosa

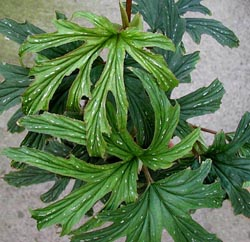
Begonia aconitifolia

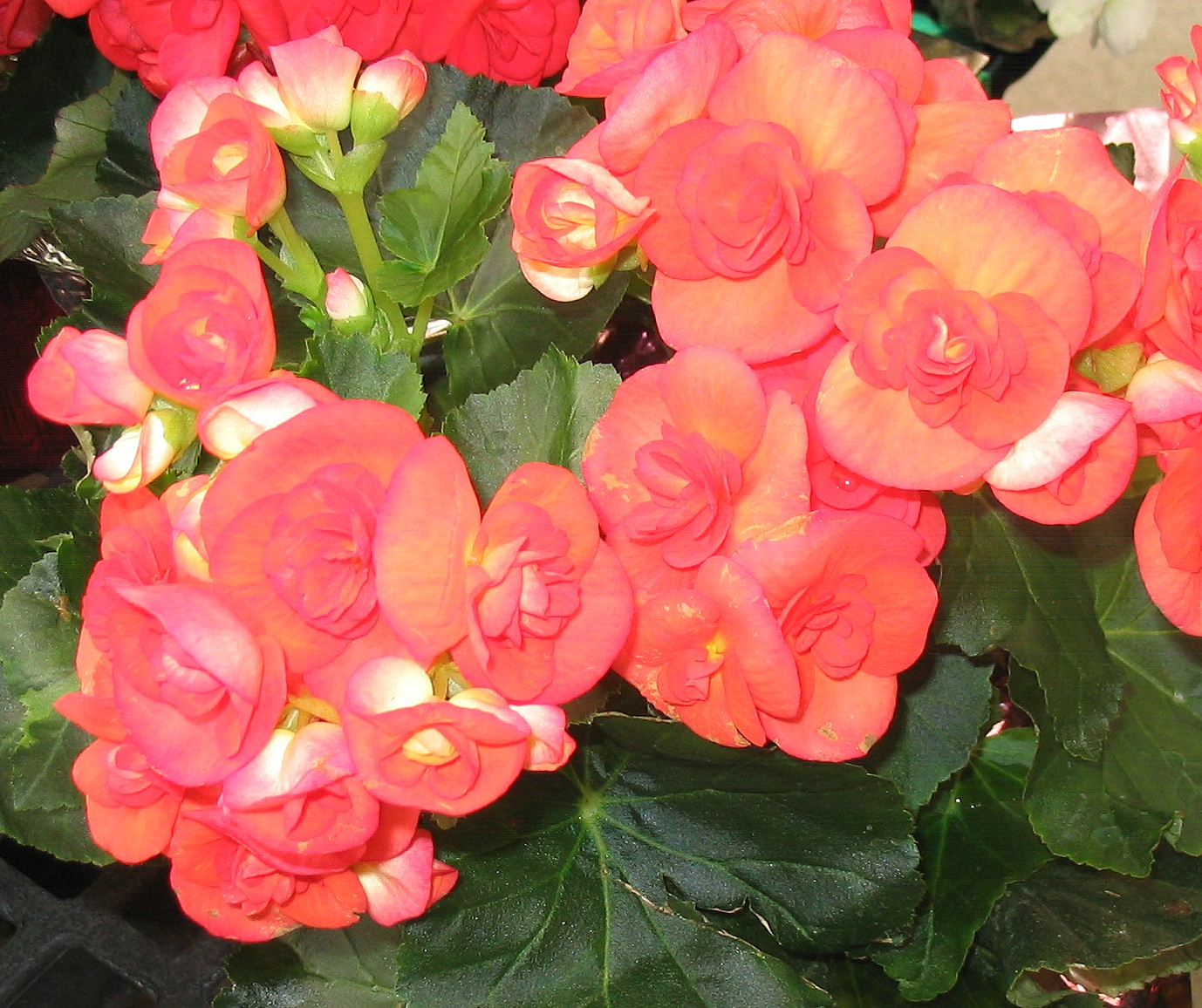
A flowering begonia

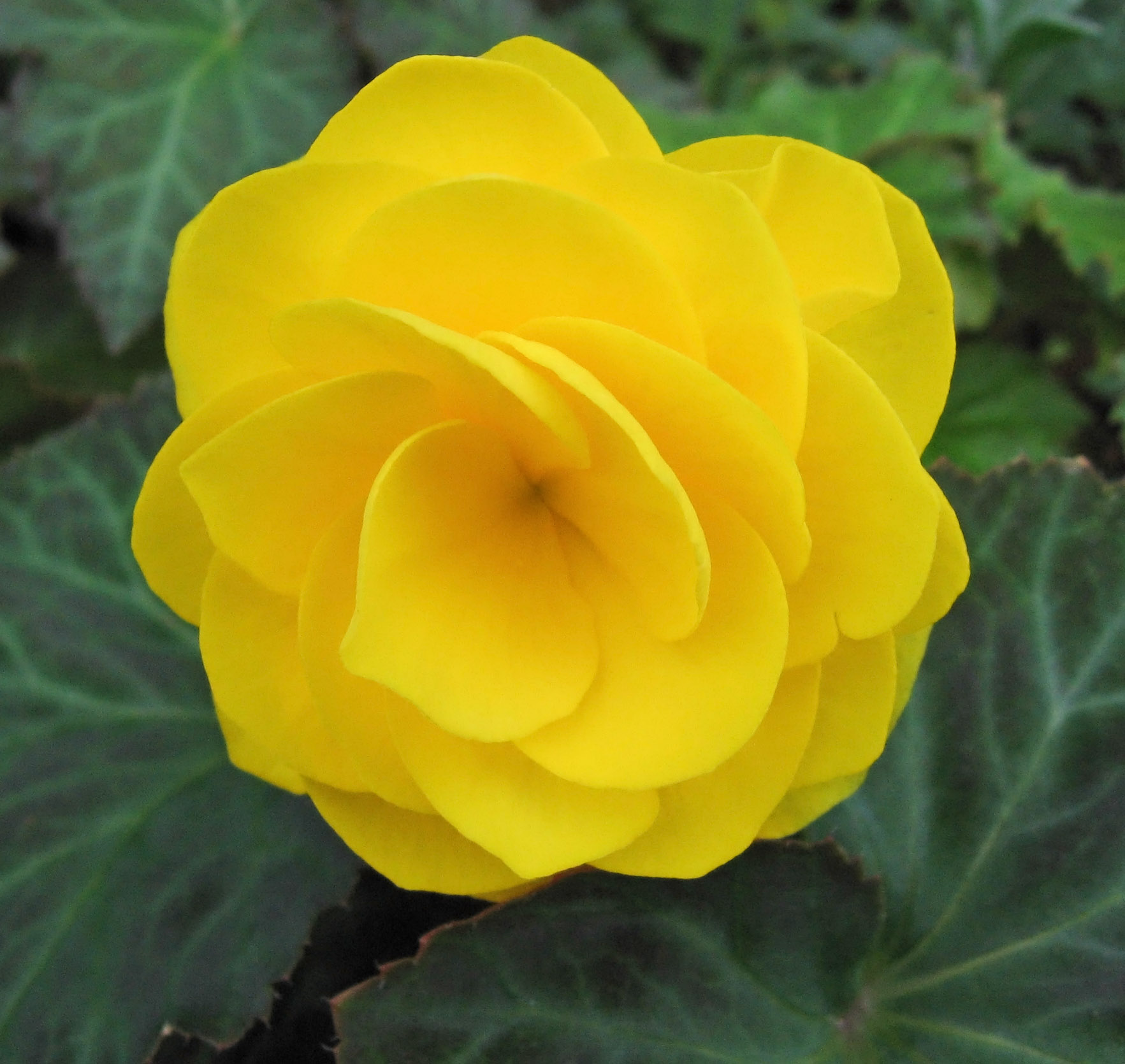
Begonia cultivars come in many different colors, such as yellow

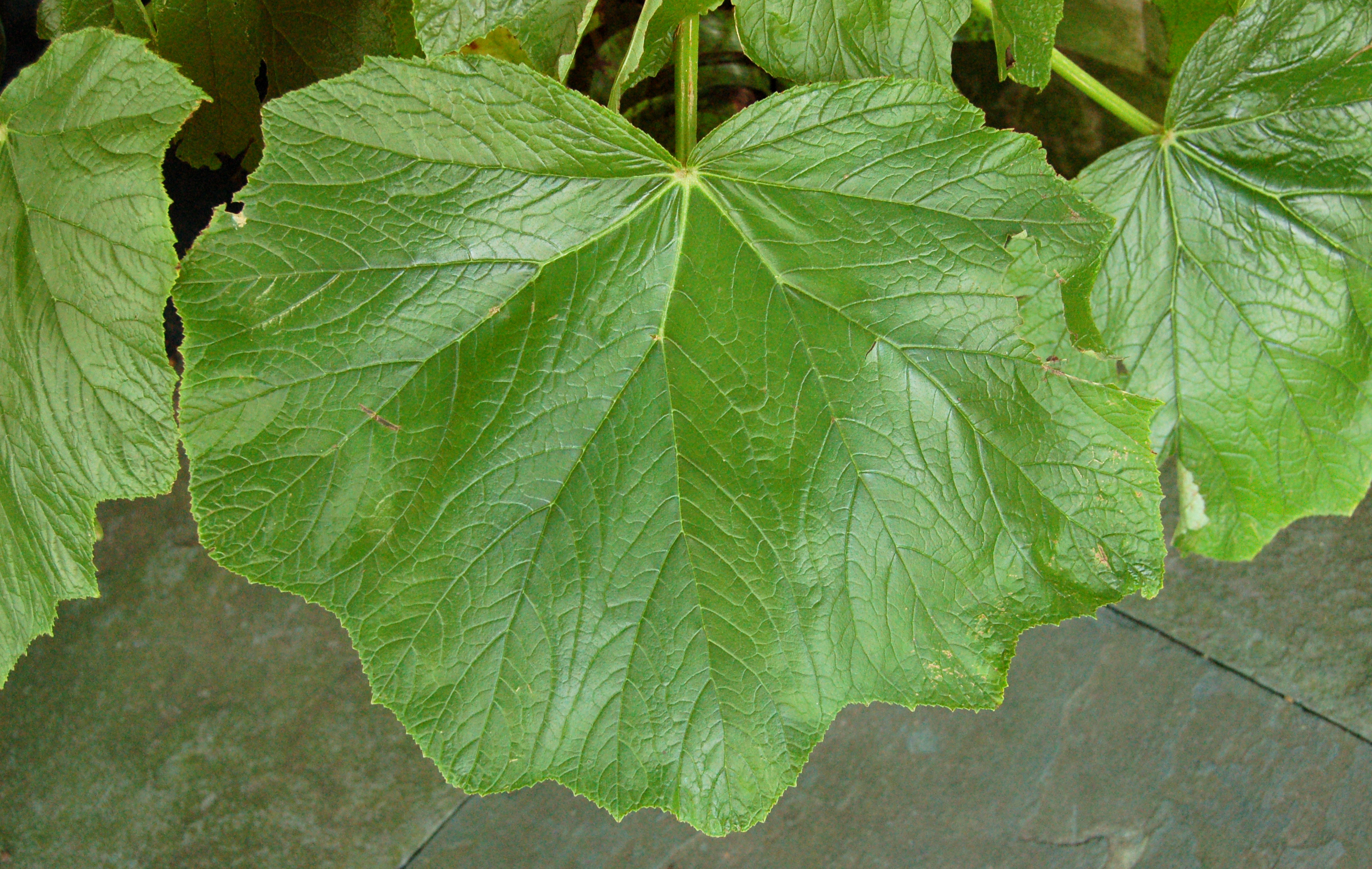
A begonia leaf

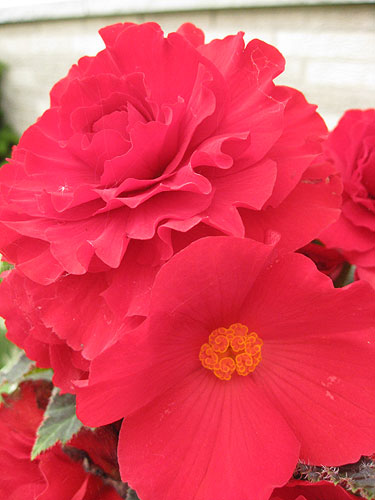
A pair of blossoms, male and female

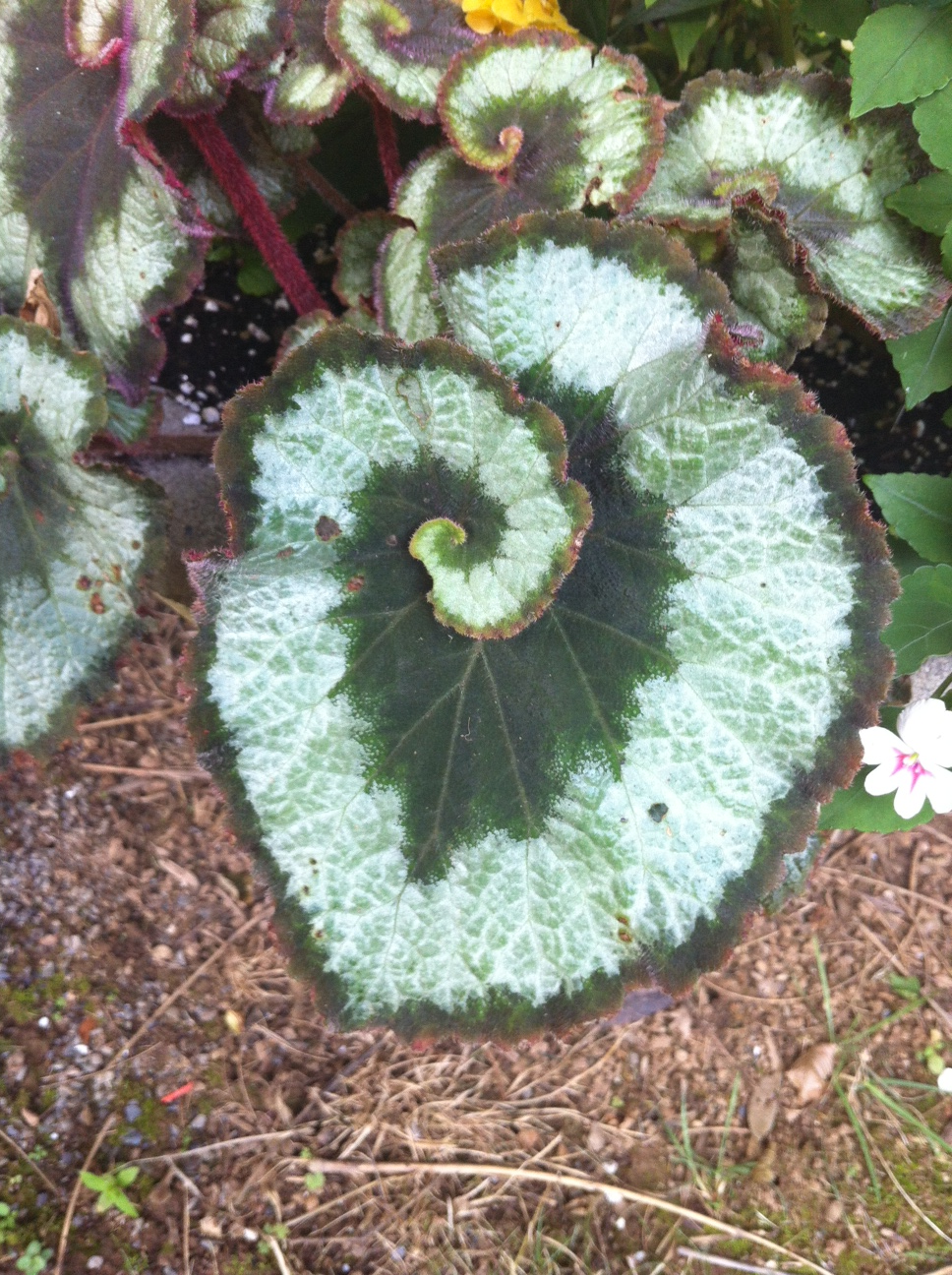
A nautilus-leaf form of begonia

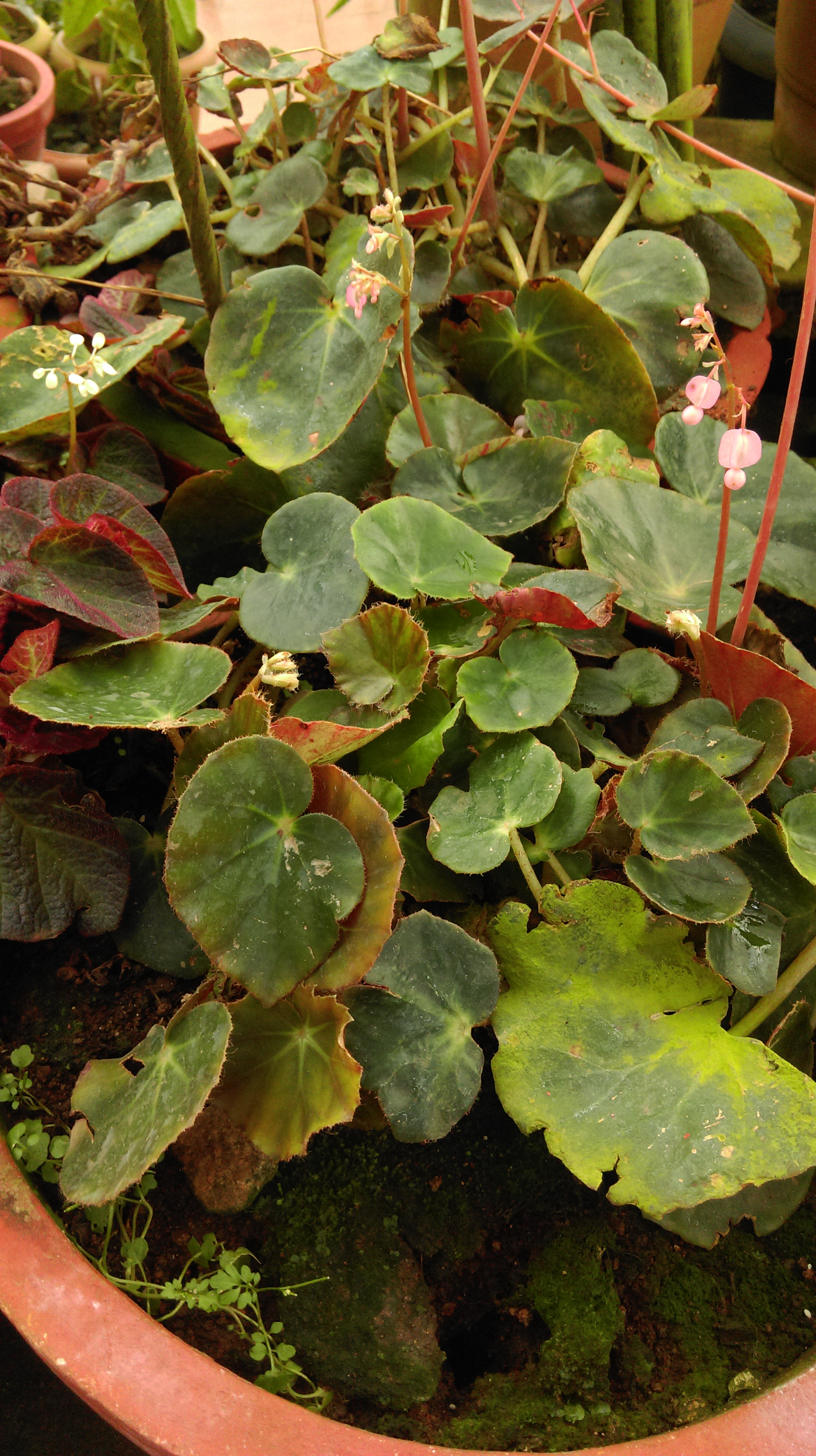
Begonia

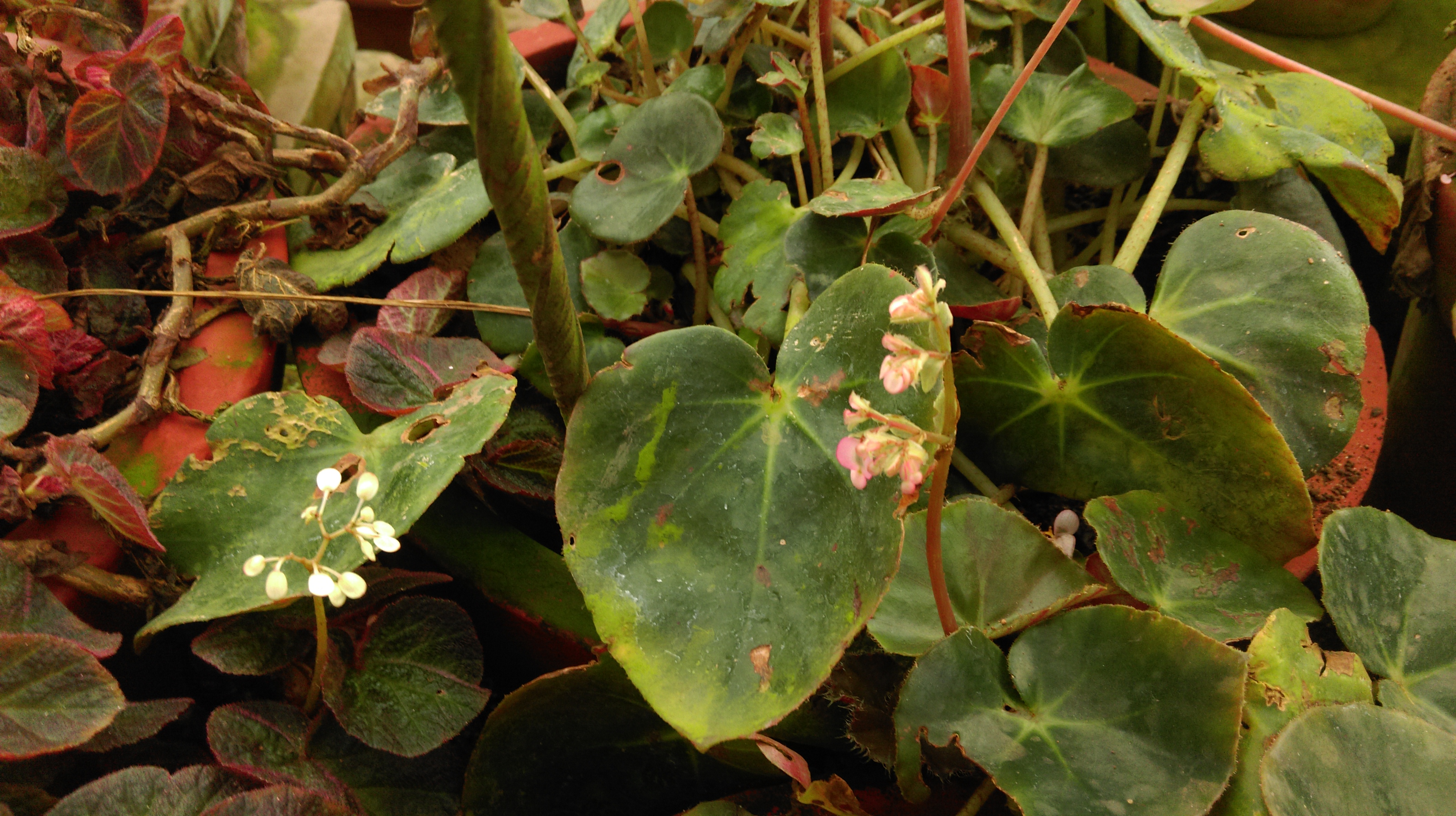
Begonia leaf

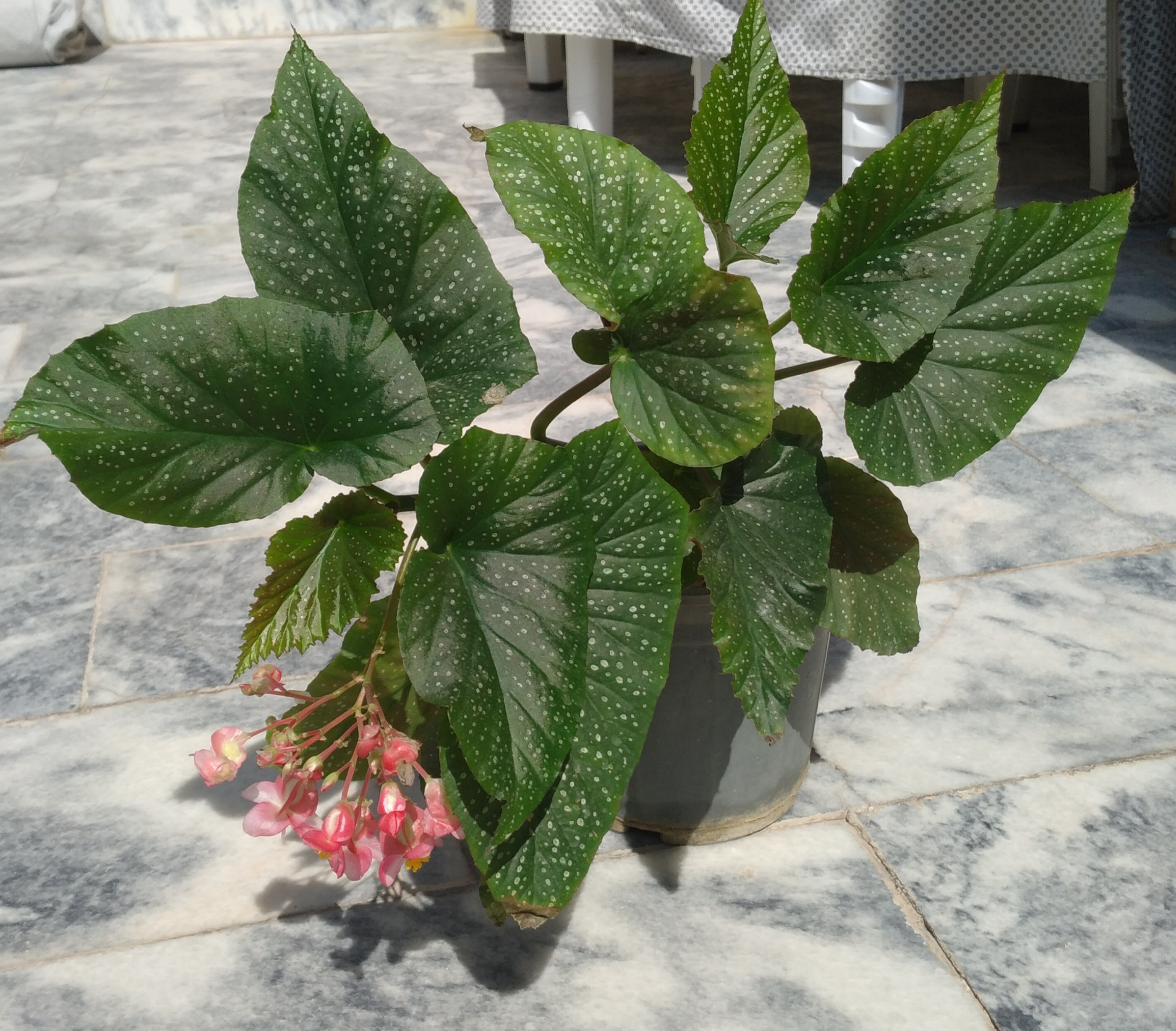
Lucerna begonia

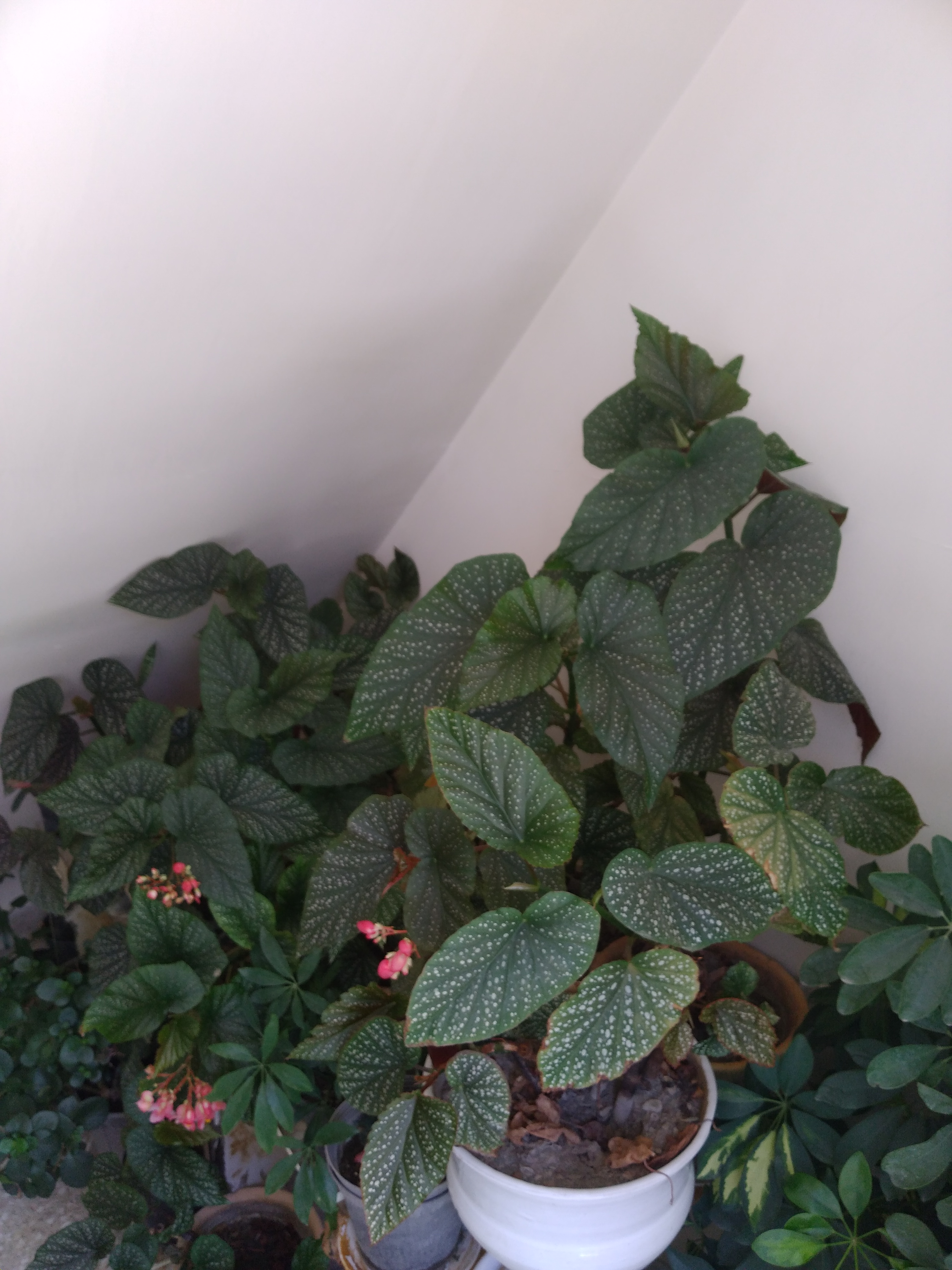
Lucerna begonia

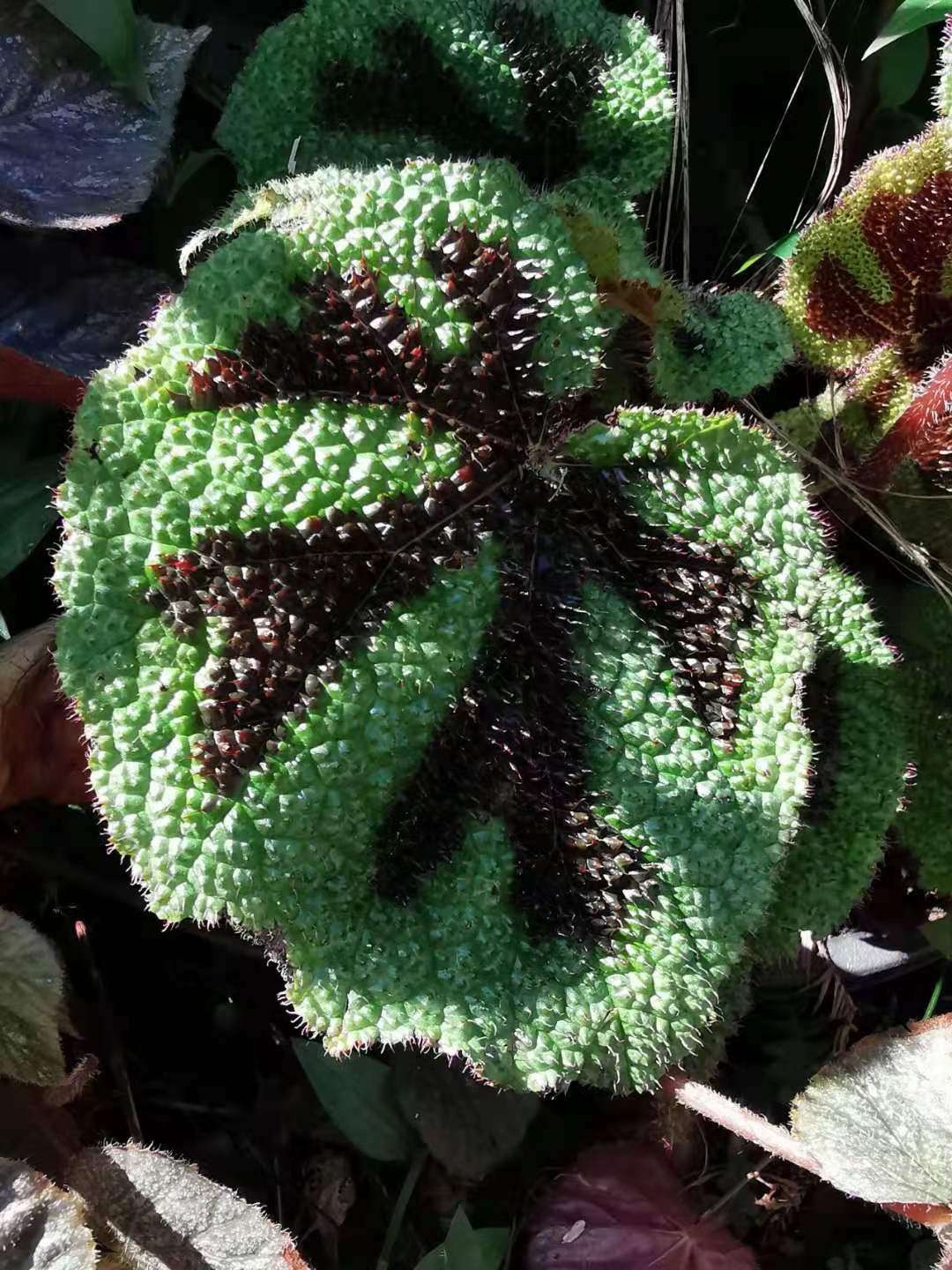
Leaf of Begonia masoniana

== Etymology ==
The genus name Begonia was coined by Charles Plumier, a French monk and botanist after discovering six new species in the Antilles, which he named Begonia to honor Michel Bégon, a former governor of the French colony of Saint-Domingue (now Haiti). The first time the name Begonia was used in print was in 1700, in a publication by Joseph Pitton de Tournefort. In 1753, Carl Linnaeus merged the original six species into one (Begonia obliqua). It was published in Species Plantarum and the name has been used ever since.

== Origin and distribution ==
Due to a lack of fossil evidence, it has been inferred based on phylogeny that begonias originated from the Paleogene to the Miocene, 20 million - 65 million years ago, with the most likely period being the period between the Middle Miocene and Oligocene. Africa is considered the center of origin for the species, but most extant species likely evolved during the Pleistocene.

The mid-miocene was a warm period, resulting in an expansion of many tropical plants into Asia, including, potentially, begonias. "One view is that the formation of the current diversity of hotspots on Begonia in China and Southeast Asia resulted from the migration and expansion of African ancestors through the Himalayas to the east. The Himalayan mountain range formed when the Asian and Indian tectonic plates collided 35 million years ago. The estimated time for the ancestors of Begonia to have arrived in the area is about 15 million years, which coincides with the emergence of the highest elevations in the Himalayas. Therefor, based on climactic characteristics, is it speculated that a significant area of the montane habitats at the north of the Indian continent might have acted as a bridge for Begonia migration toward the east, resulting in Into-China and Malay Archipelago becoming diversity hotspots for Begonia." The expansion into the Americas is likely similar, where they grow from southern Mexico to the tip of Argentina. It is thought that the African ancestors of Begonia dispersed into the neotropical region at least two separate times.

== Phylogeny ==
The following phylogenetic tree shows the relationships among sections of the genus Begonia.

- - Hillebrandia
  - Begonia
    - Yellow‑Flowering AfricanBegonia (YFAB)
      - Section Scutobegonia
      - - Section Filicibegonia
        - Section Loasibegonia
    - - - Section Erminea
        - - Fleshy‑Fruited AfricanBegonia (FFAB)
            - Section Quadrilobaria pro parte
            - - Section Mezierea
              - Nerviplacentaria–Quadrilobaria Clade
          - MalagasyBegonia (MB)
            - - Section Tetraphila pro parte
              - - Section Tetraphila pro parte
                - - Section Baccabegonia
                  - Section Squamibegonia
            - Section Tetraphila pro parte
      - - - Seasonally Dry Adapted AfricanBegonia 1 (SDAAB 1)
            - Section Sexalaria
            - Section Rostrobegonia
          - Neotropical Clade 1
            - - Section Gaerdtia
              - Section Latistigma
            - - Section Tetrachia
              - - - - Section Kollmannia
                    - Begonia acetosa Clade
                  - - Section Donaldia
                    - - Section Stellandrae
                      - Wagneria Clade
                - Core Pritzelia Clade
        - - AsianBegonia
            - - - SocotranBegonia (SB)
                  Section Peltaugustia
                - - Section Reichenheimia pro parte
                  - Section Haagea
              - - - Begonia dioica
                  - Section Reichenheimia pro parte
                - Asian Clade C
                  - Section Lauchea
                  - - Section Parvibegonia + Begonia smithiae
                    - - Section Diploclinium pro parte
                      - - - Section Alicida
                          - Section Diploclinium pro parte
                        - - Begonia boisiana
                          - - Section Diploclinium pro parte
                            - - Section Diploclinium pro parte
                              - - Section Diploclinium pro parte
                                - - Section Diploclinium pro parte
                                  - Section Platycentrum
            - Asian Clade D
              - Section Coelocentrum
              - - Begonia peltatifolia
                - - Begonia amphioxus Clade
                  - - Section Ridleyella
                    - - Section Baryandra
                      - - Section Begonia olivacea
                        - - - Section Jackia
                            - Section Bracteibegonia
                          - Ptermannia–Symbegonia Clade
          - - Seasonally Dry Adapted AfricanBegonia 2 (SDAAB 2)
              Section Augustia
            - Neotropical Clade 2
              - Neotropical Clade 2‑iii
                - - Begonia bifurcata
                  - - Section Eupetalum pro parte
                    - - Section Eupetalum pro parte
                      - - Section Eupetalum pro parte
                        - - Begonia cremnophila Clade
                          - Section Knesebeckia I + Section Barya
                - - Section Australes
                  - - Section Knesebeckia III pro parte
                    - - Begonia froebelii
                      - - Section Knesebeckia III pro parte
                        - - Begonia lutea
                          - - Section Knesebeckia II
                            - Section Gobenia
              - - Neotropical Clade 2‑i
                  - Section Quadriperigonia
                  - - - Section Parietoplacentalia
                      - Section Urniformia
                    - Section Gireoudia
                - Neotropical Clade 2‑ii
                  - - - Section Astrothrix
                      - Section Solananthera
                    - - Section Microtuberosa
                      - - Section Pereira
                        - Section Trachelocarpus
                  - - - Section Rossmannia
                      - Section Pilderia
                    - - Section Ephemera
                      - - - Section Ruizopavonia
                          - Casparya–Semibegoniella Clade
                        - - Section Lepsia
                          - - Section Doratometra
                            - - Section Begonia
                              - - Begonia acutifolia Clade
                                - - Section Hydristyles
                                  - Section Cyathocnemis

=== Species ===
Selected species:

- Begonia coccinea
- Begonia cucullata
- Begonia foliosa
- Begonia grandis Dryand.
- Begonia obliqua

== Cultivation ==
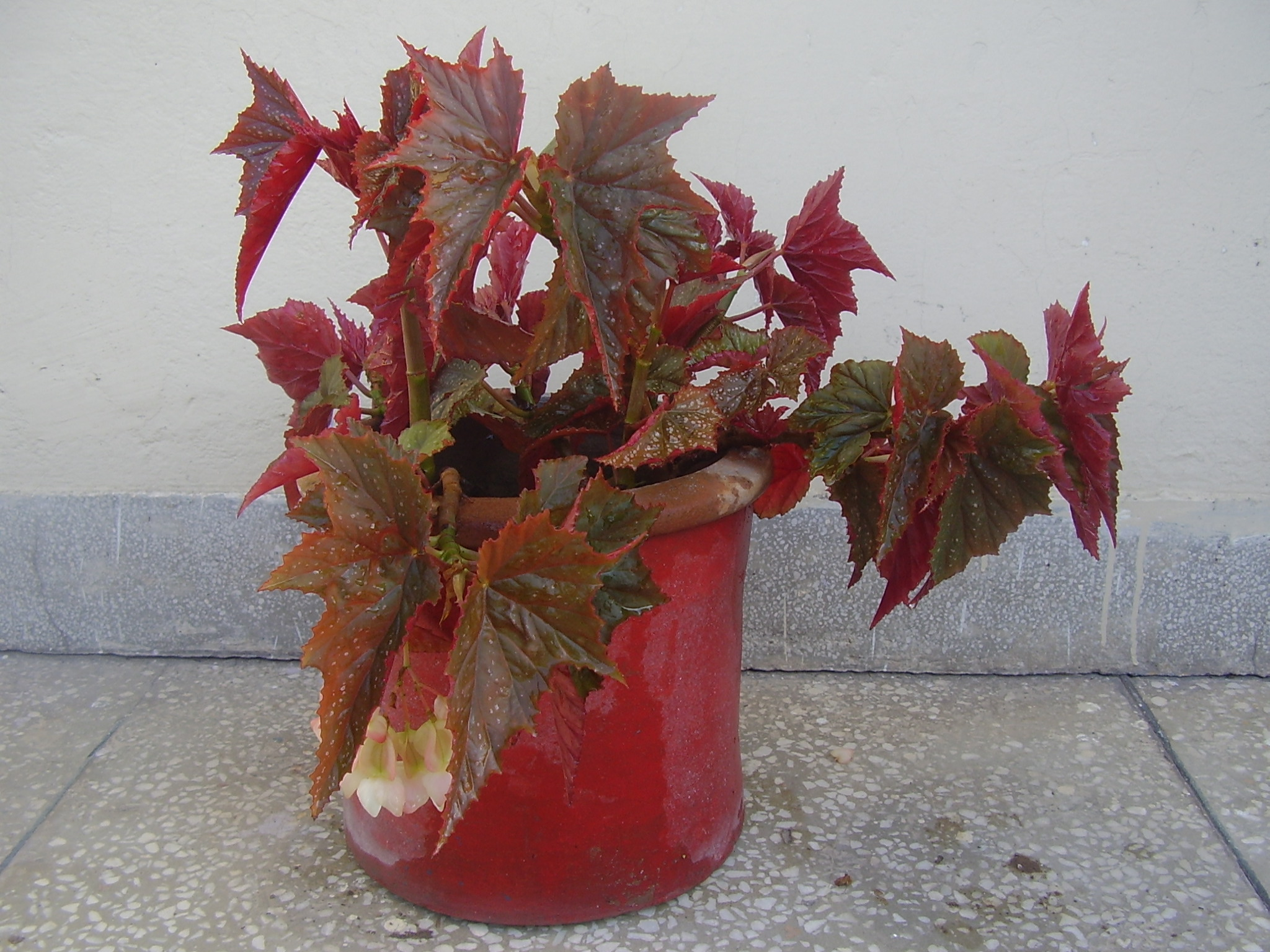
A potted angel wing begonia (Begonia aconitifolia × B. coccinea)

The different groups of begonias have different care requirements, but most species come from tropical regions, so they and their hybrids require warm temperatures. Most are forest understory plants and require bright shade; few will tolerate full sun, especially in warmer climates. In general, begonias require a well-drained growing medium that is neither constantly wet nor allowed to dry out completely. Many begonias will grow and flower year-round except for tuberous begonias, which usually have a dormant period. During this dormant period, the tubers can be stored in a cool, dry place. Begonias of the semperflorens group (or wax begonias) are frequently grown as bedding plants outdoors. Wax begonias are very attractive, they adapt well when brought inside the house for overwintering and can live up to 4–5 years.

A recent group of hybrids derived from this group is marketed as "Dragonwing" begonias; they are much larger both in leaf and in flower. Tuberous begonias are frequently used as container plants. Although most Begonia species are tropical or subtropical in origin, the Chinese species B. grandis is hardy to USDA hardiness zone 6 and is commonly known as the "hardy begonia". Most begonias can be grown outdoors year-round in subtropical or tropical climates, but in temperate climates, begonias are grown outdoors as annuals, or as house or greenhouse plants.

Most begonias are easily propagated by division or from stem cuttings. In addition, some can be propagated from leaf cuttings or even sections of leaves, particularly the members of the rhizomatous and rex groups.

=== Horticultural nomenclature ===
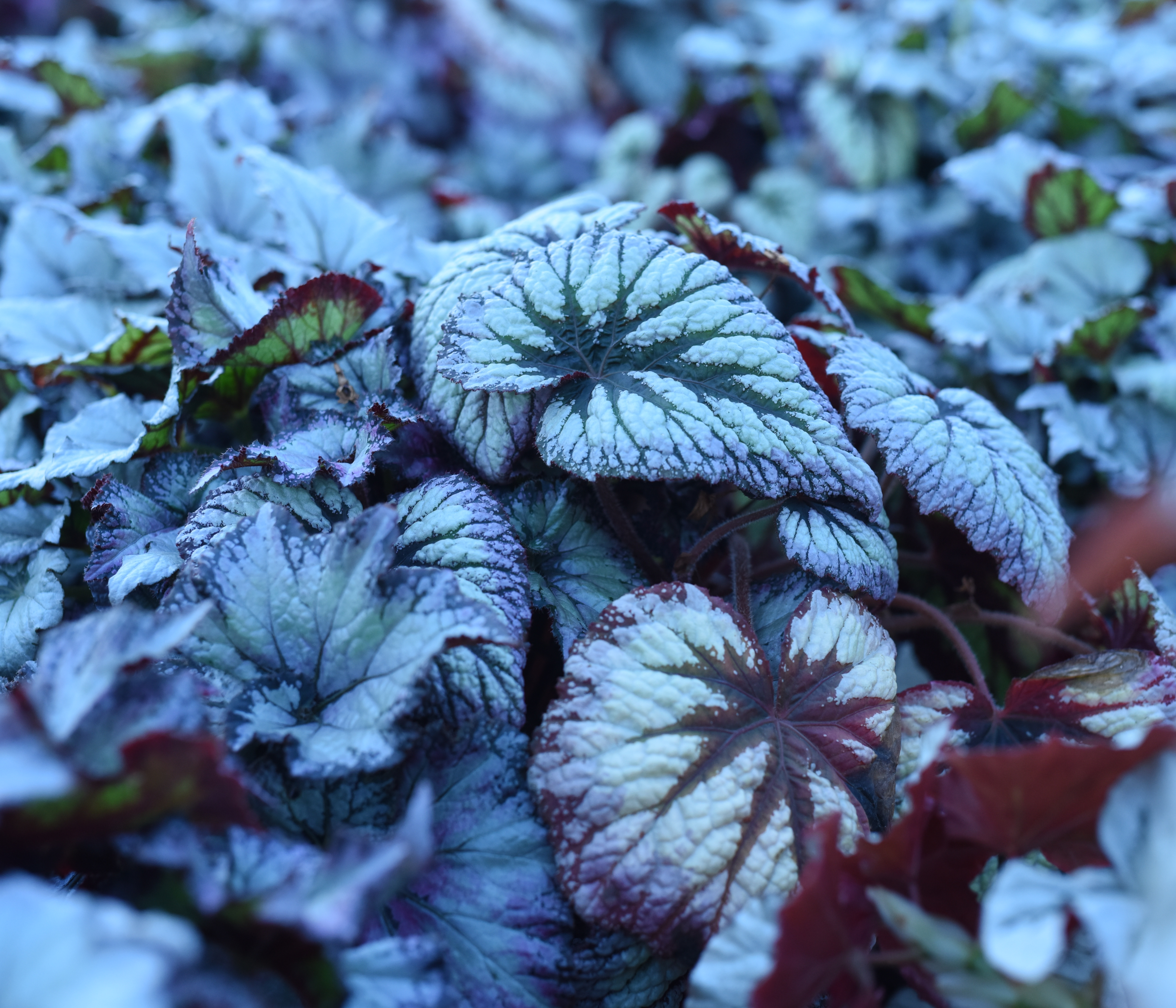
Plum Paisley Begonias in a greenhouse.

To describe the flower-shape of a begonia, the following abbreviations are sometimes used:

1. (S) Single – large single flowers, four usually flat tepals (flower part undistinguishable as sepal or petal)
2. (Fr) Frilled, Crispa – large single flowers, tepal margins frilled or ruffled
3. (Cr) Cristata, Crested – large single flowers, frilled or tufted center of tepals
4. (N) Narcissiflora, Daffodil-flowered – large more or less double flowers, central tepals form "trumpet"
5. (C) Camellia, Camelliflora – large double flowers resembling camellias, unruffled, solid colors
6. (RC) Ruffled Camellia – camellia flowers ruffled on edges
7. (R) Rosebud, Rosiflora – large double flowers with rose bud-like center
8. (Car) Carnation, Fimbriata Plena – large double carnation-like flowers, tepals fringed on margins
9. (P) Picotee – large usually double flowers like camellias, tepals with different color on margin blending with other color
10. (M) Marginata – like Picotee only distinct non-blending line of color on margins
11. (Mar) Marmorata, Marbled – like Camellia but rose-colored, blotched or spotted with white
12. (HB) Hanging Basket, Pendula – stems trailing or pendant, large to small flowers single or double
13. (Mul) Multiflora – low, bushy, compact plants with many small single or double flowers 'Non-Stop' refers to a camellia tuberous hybrid that under certain conditions will bloom 'non-stop' all year round.

=== Cultivar groups ===
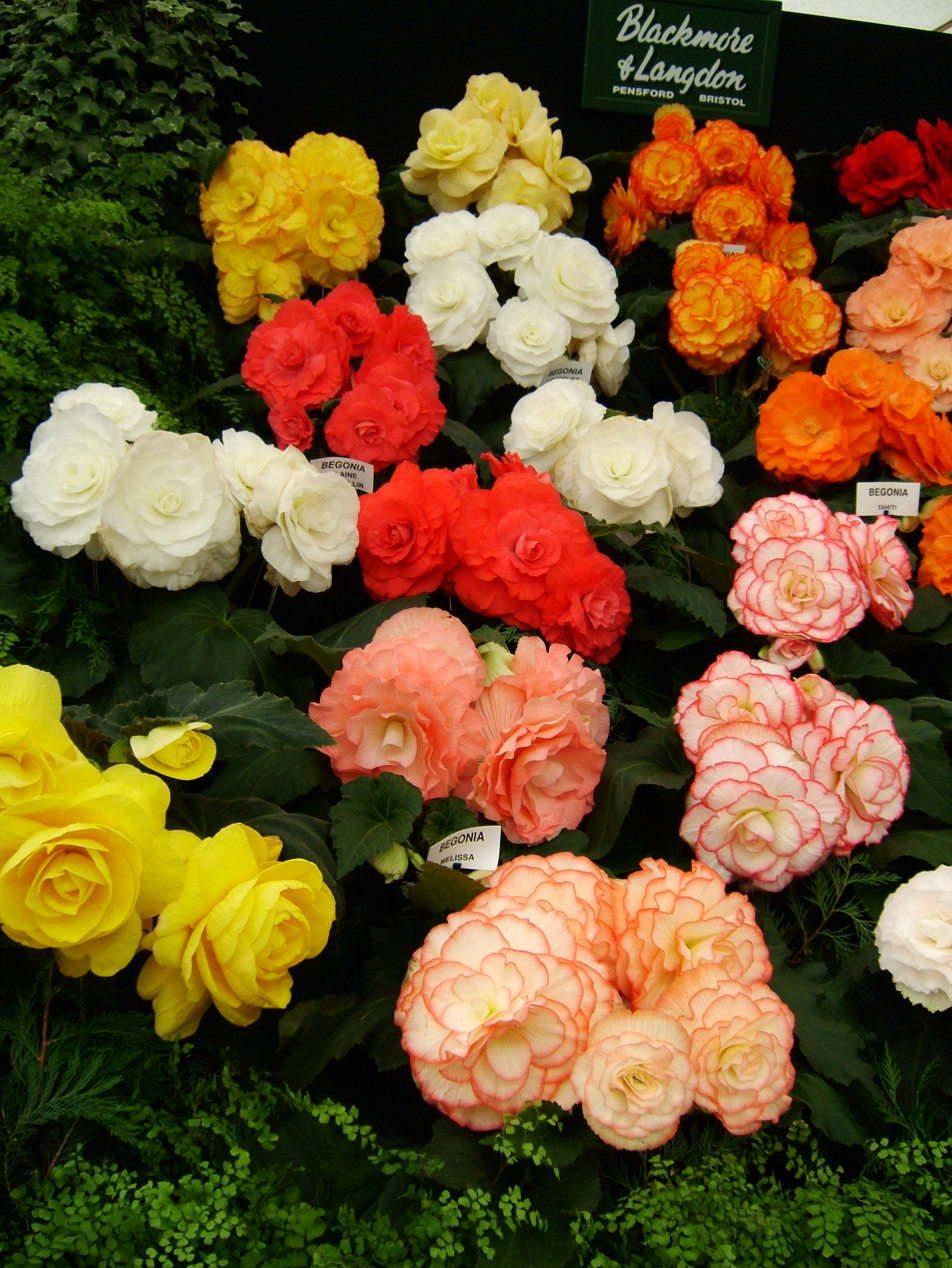
Display of (tuberous) begonias, Hampton Court Flower Show

Because of their sometimes showy flowers of white, pink, scarlet, or yellow color and often attractively marked leaves, many species and innumerable hybrids and cultivars are cultivated. The genus is unusual in that species throughout the genus, even those coming from different continents, can frequently be hybridized with each other, and this has led to an enormous number of cultivars. The American Begonia Society is the International Cultivar Registration Authority for Begonia, and classifies them into several major groups:

- Cane-like
- Shrub-like
- Semperflorens
- Rhizomatous
- Rex
- Tuberous and Semi-Tuberous
- × Hiemalis/ Reiger/ Elatior Cheimantha
- Thick-stemmed
- Trailing/Scandent

For the most part, these groups do not correspond to any formal taxonomic groupings or phylogeny, and many species and hybrids have characteristics of more than one group or do not fit well in any of them.

=== AGM plants ===
The following is a selection from about 70 species, varieties and cultivars which currently hold the Royal Horticultural Society's Award of Garden Merit:

- Begonia 'Benitochiba'
- Begonia dregei
- Begonia foliosa var. miniata
- Begonia 'Glowing Embers'
- Begonia grandis subsp. evansiana
- Begonia grandis subsp. evansiana var. alba
- Begonia 'Green Gold'
- Begonia listada
- Begonia luxurians
- Begonia masoniana
- Begonia metallica
- Begonia solananthera
- Begonia soli-mutata
- Begonia sutherlandii

== Culture ==
The cultivar 'Kimjongilia' is a floral emblem of North Korea.

The species Begonia darthvaderiana was named for the Star Wars character.

Most begonias are sour to the taste, and some people in some areas eat them. This is safe in small amounts but potentially toxic in large quantities due to the prevalence of oxalic acid in the tissues.

In floriography begonias represent a warning, "we are being watched," "this must end," "be careful," and/or "take heed."

Bian Gong wrote a poem titled Begonia, and Chen Chun wrote an Inscription on Begonia. Begonias are associated with the love stories of Lu You and Wan Tang as well as a legend titled 采兰杂志(采兰, so begonias are symbolic of love in China. 采兰杂志(采兰 (which translates roughly to 'gathering orchids' or 'gathering valuable information') lies within the Biji literary genre. It tells the story of a woman mourning the loss of her husband whose tears turn to begonias. The author is unknown and it's generally believed to come from before the Ming dynasty:

昔有妇人怀人不见 (a long time ago there was a woman who missed her beloved but could not meet him)，恒洒泪于北墙之下。(she often cried and her tears fell beneath the northern wall) 后洒处生草 (Later plants grew where her tears had fallen)，其花甚媚 (the flowers were beautiful)，色如妇面(and their color was similar to her rosy cheek)，其叶正绿反红(the leaves were green on top and red underneath)，秋开(they bloomed in autumn)，名曰‘断肠花’(they were called heartbreaking flower)，即今‘秋海棠’也。(aka today's Begonia, 秋海棠)

— Unknown, 采兰杂志(采兰
