= Cane begonia =

Group of plant cultivars

Cane-Like Begonia
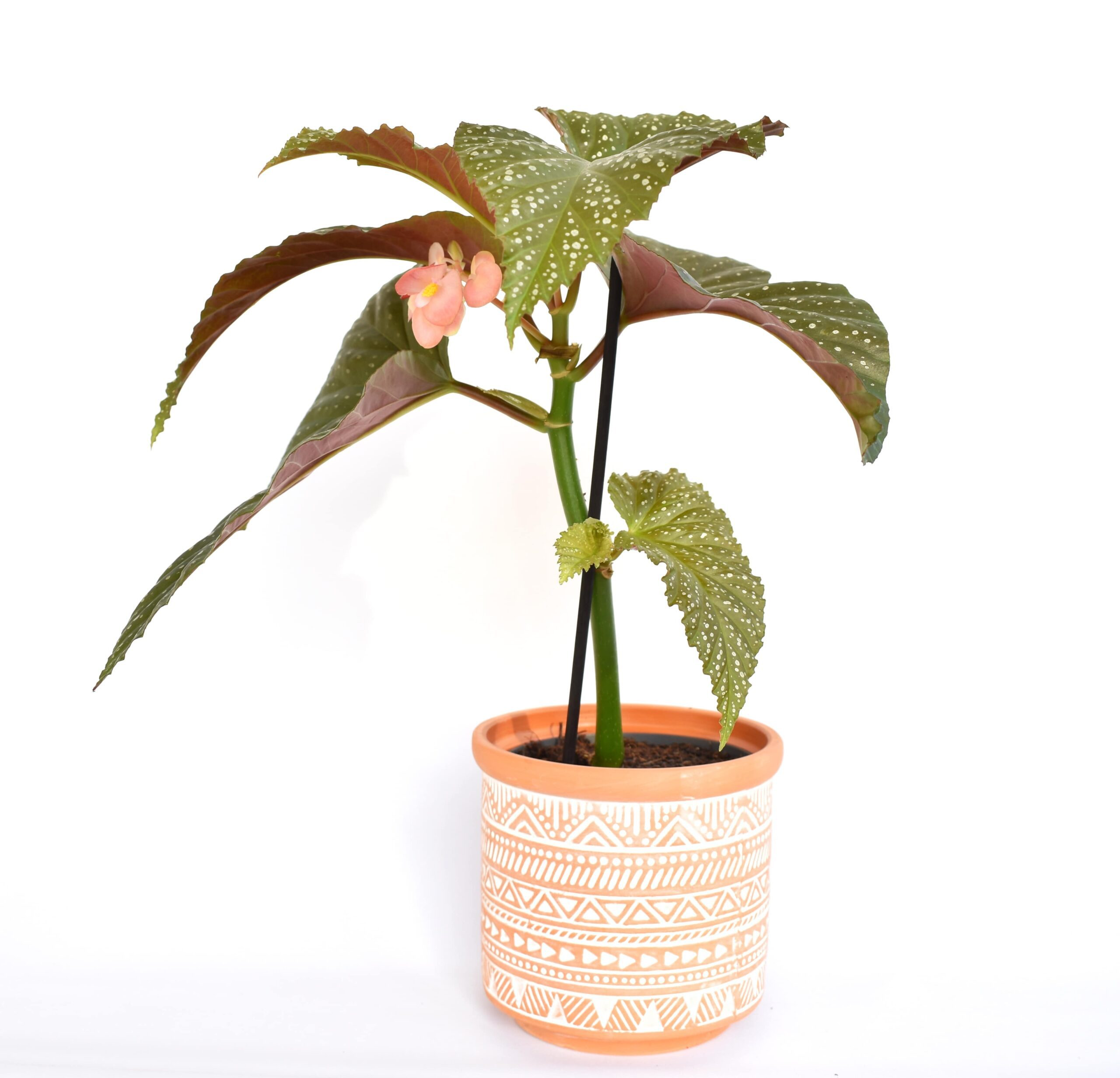
- Thick, bamboo-like stems with swollen nodes are the defining features of this kind of begonia.
- Genus: Begonia

Cane-like (also cane or cane-stem) is an informal classification of Begonia, containing about 81 species and 2,000 cultivars. Thick, bamboo-like stems with swollen nodes are the defining features distinguishing them from other types of begonias. Many are free-flowering, with large clusters of flowers, and some are even noticeably fragrant. Some cultivars are capable of growing to 3 to 5 meters (9.8 to 16.4 ft) tall. One of the oldest cane cultivars, Begonia 'Carollina de Lucerna' was developed in 1890 and remains a popular plant today.

The earliest green-leaved canes were called angel wing because of the leaf shape. As more species, hybrids, and cultivars were documented, this epithet began to be used for more and more different types of begonias and became too blurry as a category. The American Begonia Society no longer uses this as a classification.

== Sub-categories ==
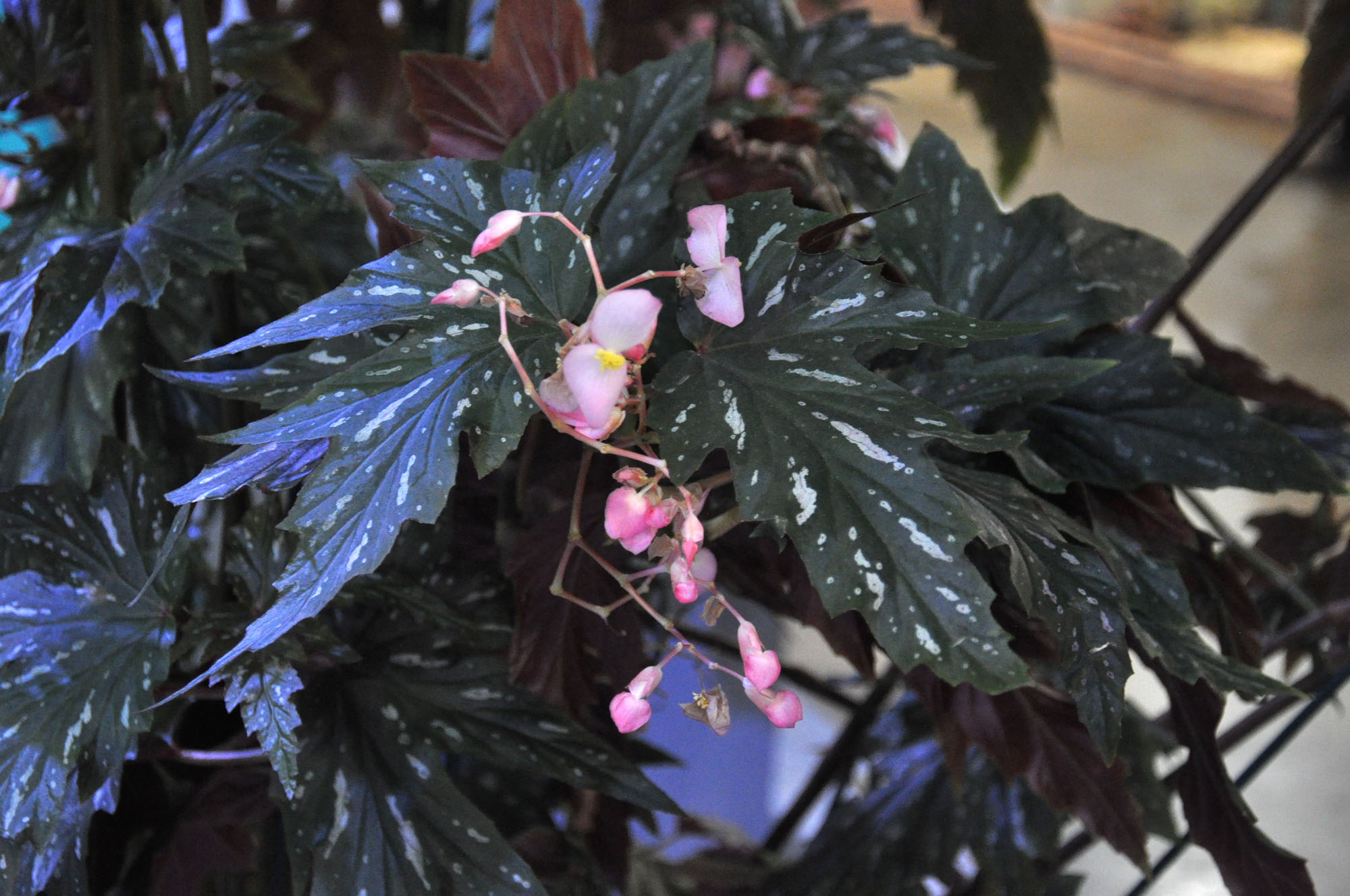
B. 'Sophie Cecile' is a Superba Cane

The American Begonia Society uses three sub-categories to group similar cane-like begonias together: Superba Canes, Mallet Canes, and All Others.

Like most Begonia categories, these do not have rigorous scientific definitions, but are used more generally to group cultivars with similar characteristics.

=== Superba canes ===
In 1926, Eva Kenworthy Gray created the first Superba cultivar by crossing Begonia aconitifolia with B. 'Lucerna.' B. aconitifolia gave the leaves of this hybrid large, jagged lobes, and B. 'Lucerna' added red-purple tones to the foliage.

Eva Kenworthy Gray created the first Superba cultivar by crossing Begonia aconitifolia with B. 'Lucerna.'

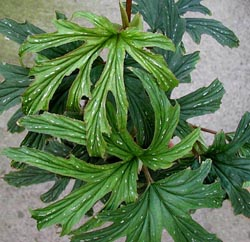
B. aconitifolia

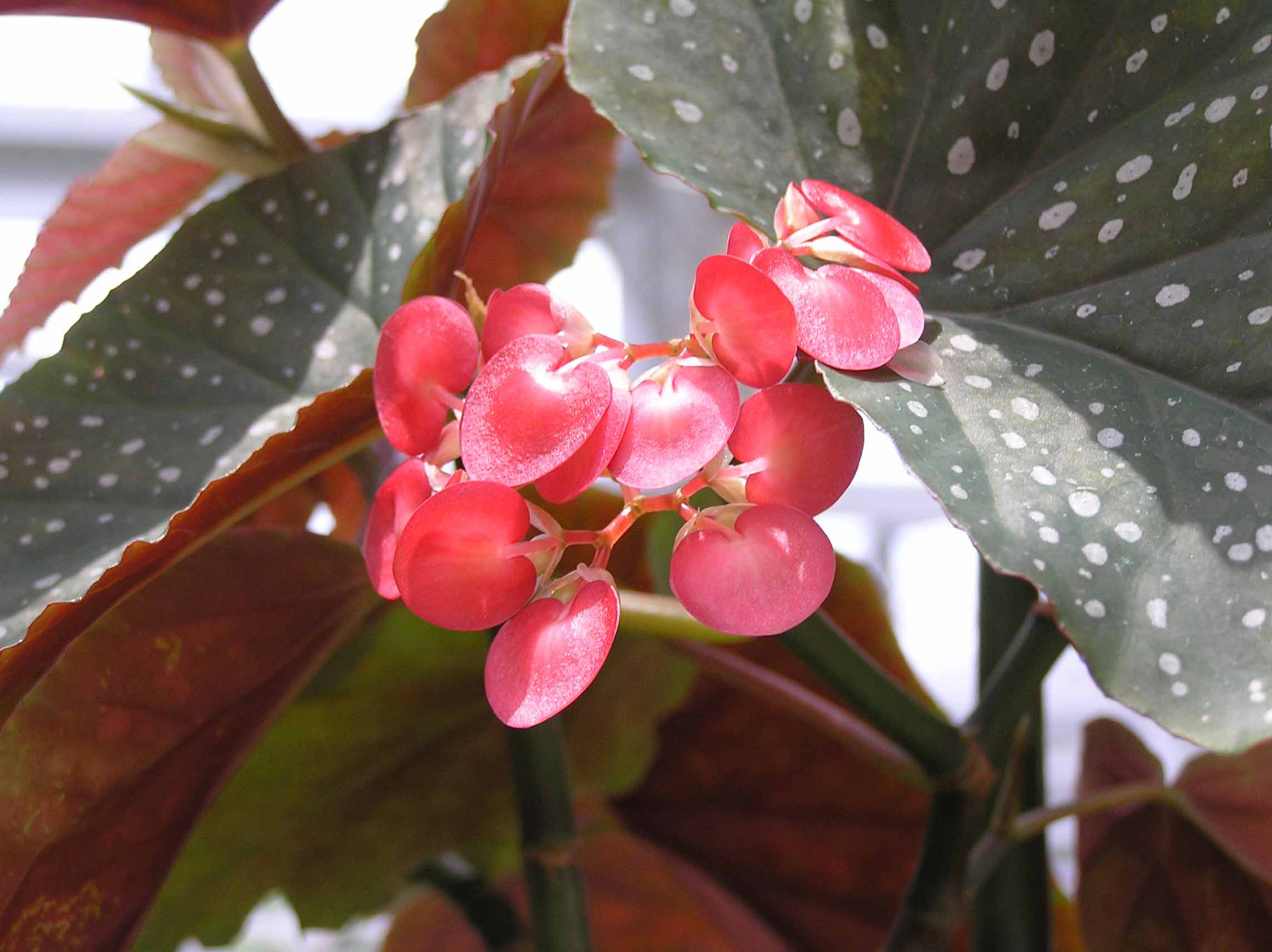
B. 'Lucerna'

This epithet was eventually used to describe any canes with Begonia aconitifolia, Begonia sceptrum, or Begonia leathermanaie in the parentage, that also had deeply lobed or jagged leaves and purple coloring.

All Superbas recognized today are descendants of those original hybrids, but not every descendant hybrid is considered Superba. The reason those original hybrids were grouped initially is because they had characteristics unlike any other canes at the time, so any descendants that lacked these unique features did not fit the criteria for being categorized this way.

Because these criteria do not correspond to any formal taxonomic grouping or phylogeny, there are several "definitions", depending on the authority. An example of definition-variation is if large size and tall growing habit are necessary characteristics, or if more compact varieties that otherwise have the definitional parentage and foliage features should also be considered Superba.

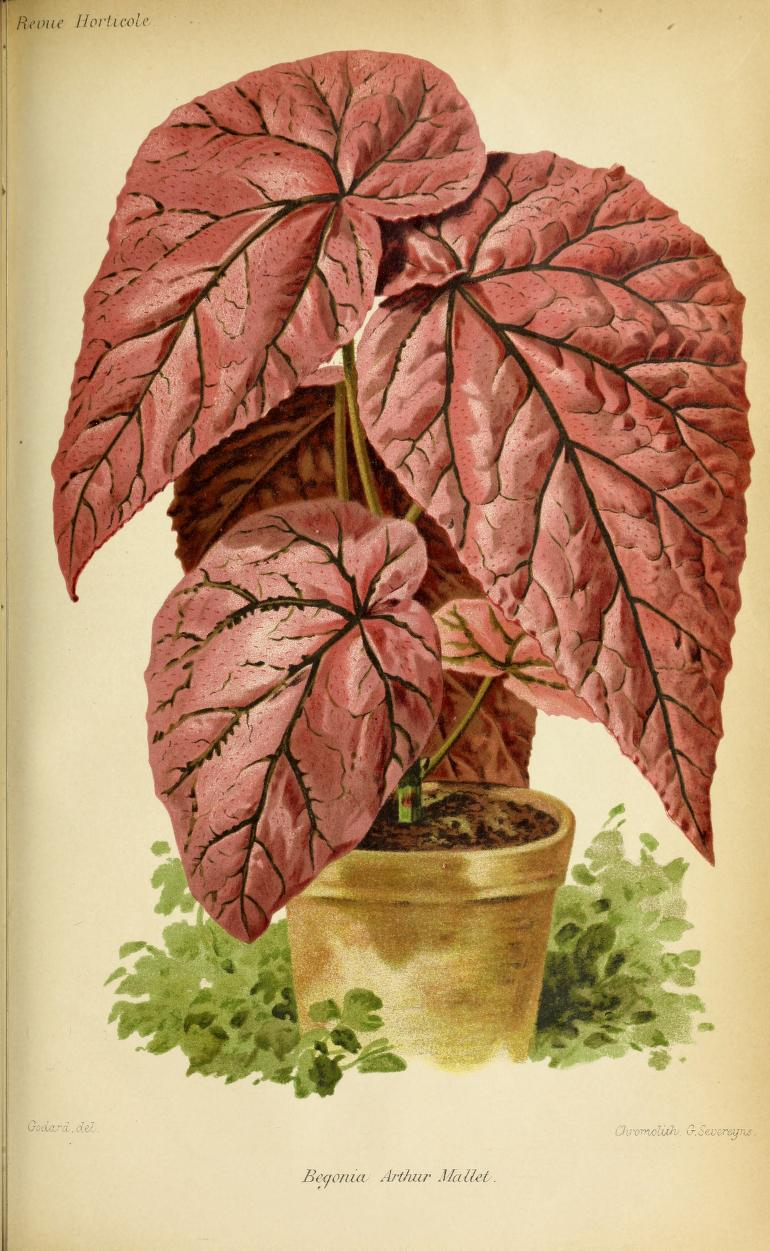
A color lithograph of Begonia 'Arthur Mallet' drawn by Edouard Godard and published in Revue Horticole in 1886

=== Mallet canes ===
The strict definition of a Mallet (pronounced like "ballet") cane would be the original B. 'Arthur Mallet' and its descendants. This strict definition becomes difficult to enforce given that the parentage of this original specimen is unclear. The father plant was likely B. 'Eldorado,' a Begonia rex cultivar. Begonia subpeltata var rubra may be the female parent, though it may have been referred to as Begonia incarnata var purpureacens and/or B. incarnata var purpurea, or the parent-plant itself may have actually been a hybrid of one of these.

In 2008, it was suggested that for the sake of the American Begonia Society's show classification, Mallet-class begonias could also be called "Red-Leaved Class" to minimize confusion.

=== All others ===
Any cane that does not fall into one of the above categories falls into All Others, including B. albo-picta, B. coccinea, B. 'Lenore Olivier', B. lubbersii, and B. 'Lucerna'.

Sometimes this category is divided further into two more groups, Rubra and Intermediate.

Rubra Canes do not have any leaf serrations, and many of the older types have plain leaves of either green or bronze. Examples include B. 'Orange Rubra' and B. 'Tom Ment'.

Intermediate canes fall somewhere between Superba and Rubra, having some characteristics of Superba but not all of them. Examples include B. 'Ripsaw' and B. 'Joesphine'.

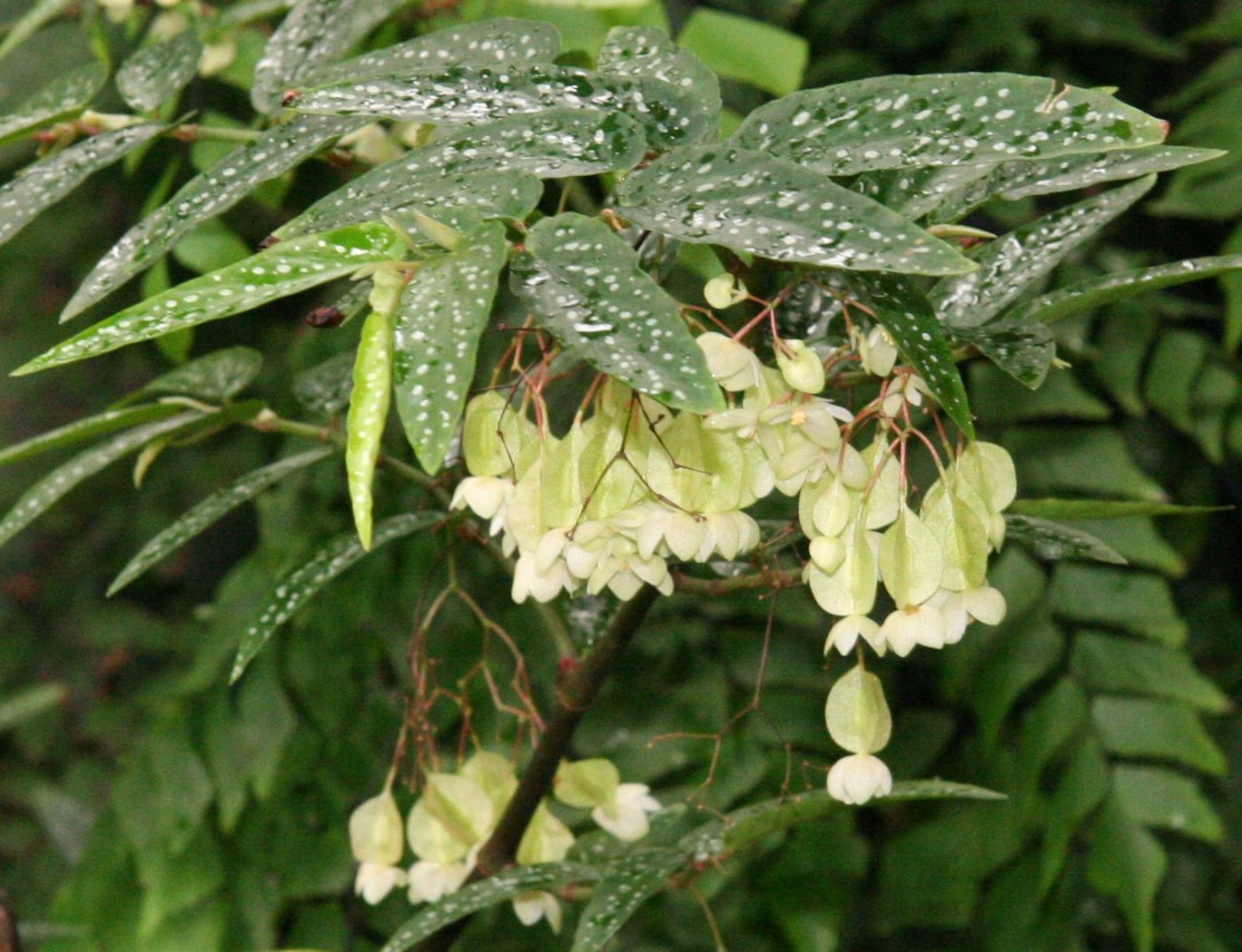
Begonia albopicta

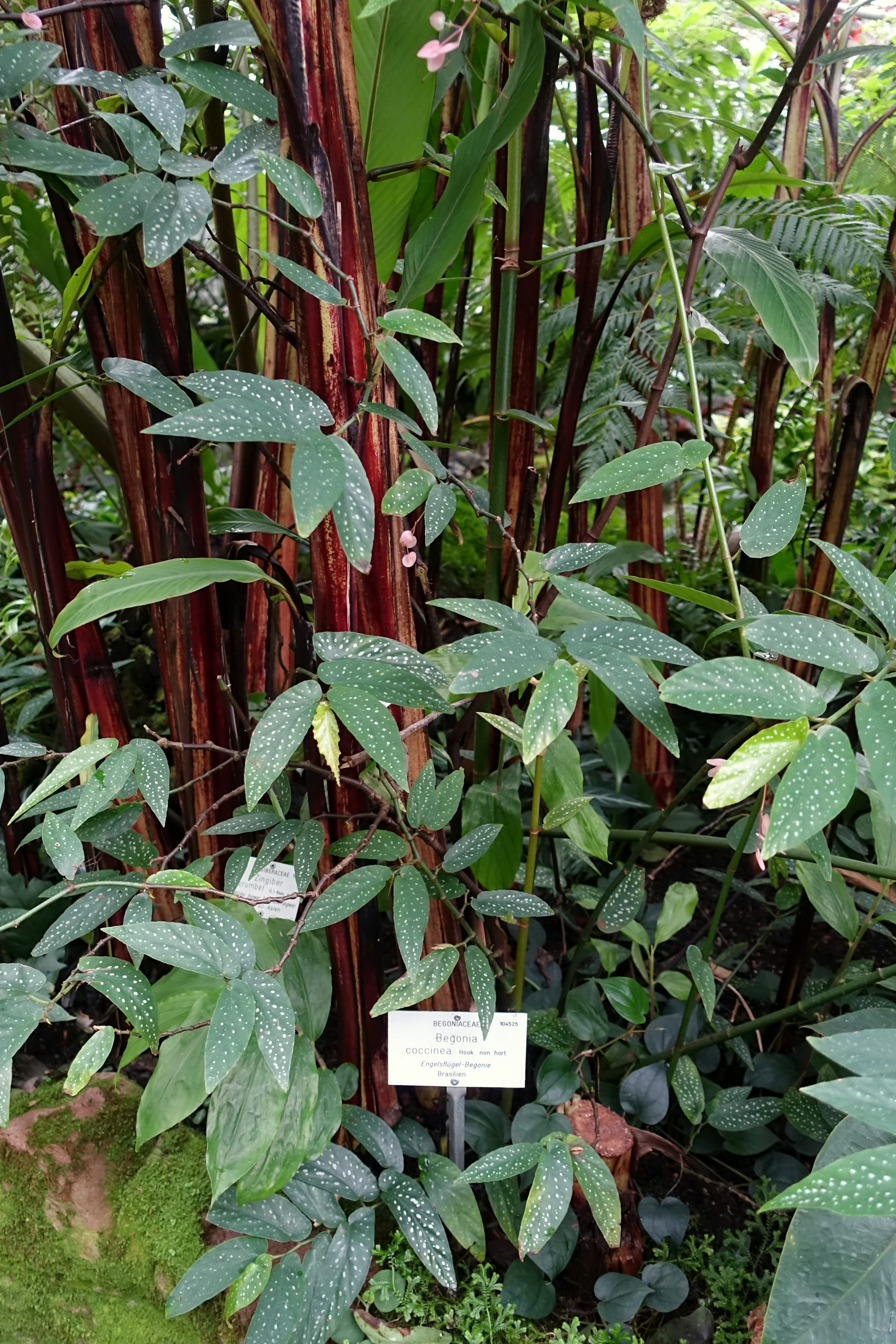
Begonia coccinea

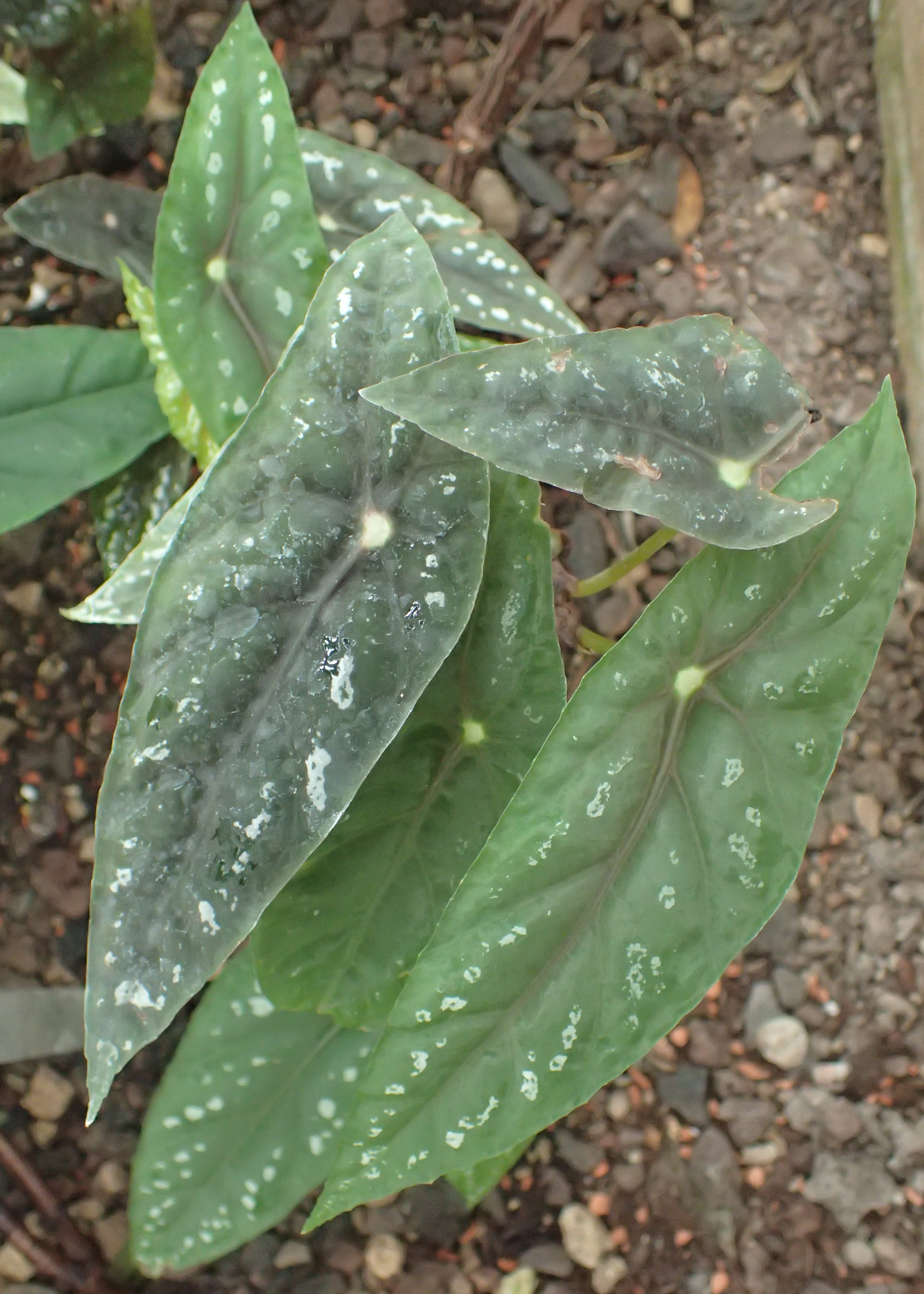
Begonia lubbersii

== Cultivation ==
In suitable climates, canes grow better in a garden than in a container. If they are grown in a container, their relatively deep root system needs to be accounted for. They also need ample room for the development of new canes, which grow from peripheral roots. They need at least a few hours of sun each day for the best flower display. Canes can tolerate and even benefit from heavy pruning: up to two thirds of the plant can be cut away. They should be trimmed just above a node. They also benefit from regular fertilization. These plants can live up to ten years in a garden, but container plants need to be regularly repotted to avoid becoming root-bound.

== Propagation ==
Cane begonias can be propagated from cuttings that include a node. A single cane begonia leaf can grow roots and continue to survive as a single leaf, but will never grow, referred to as a zombie leaf.
