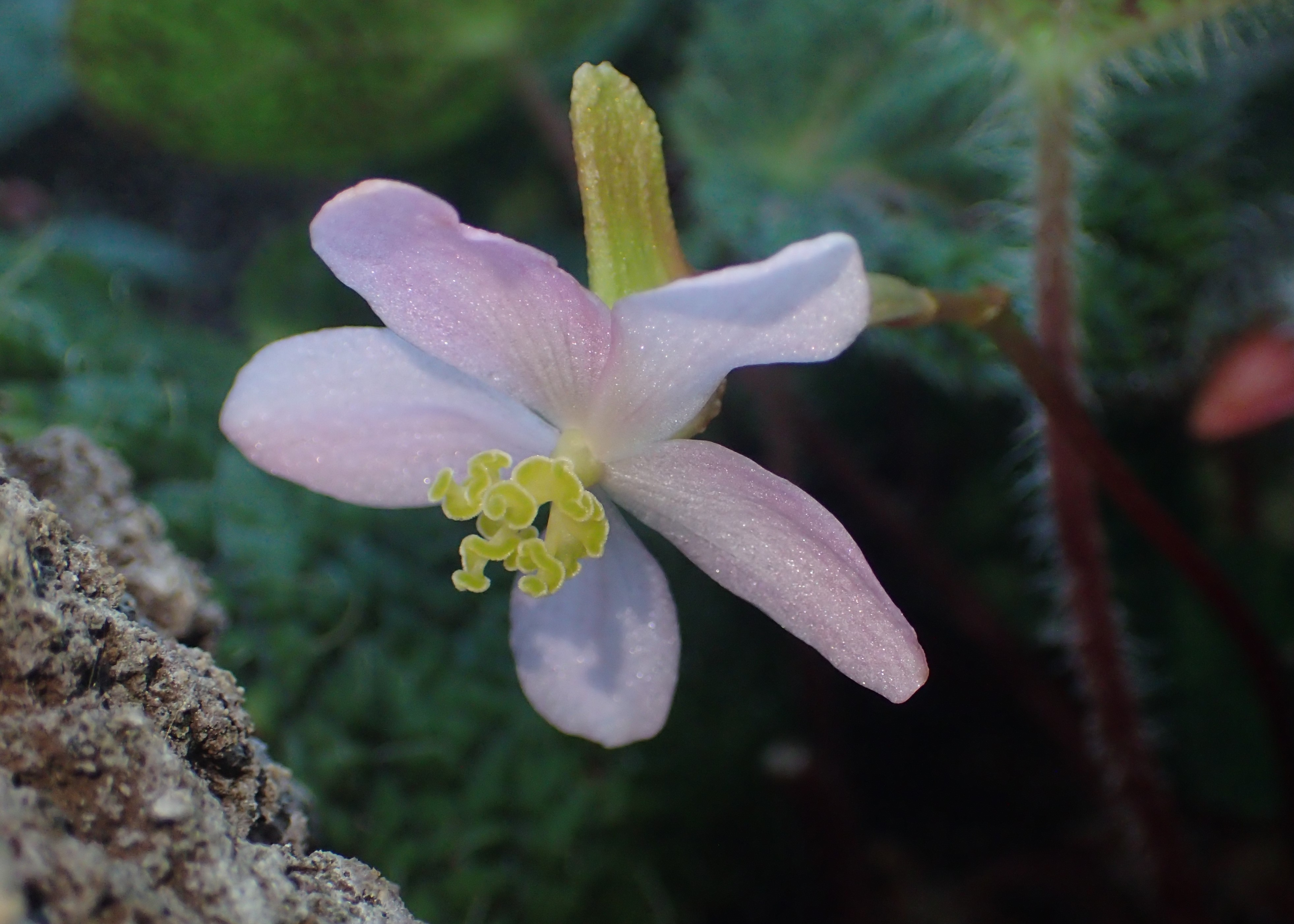
- Flower
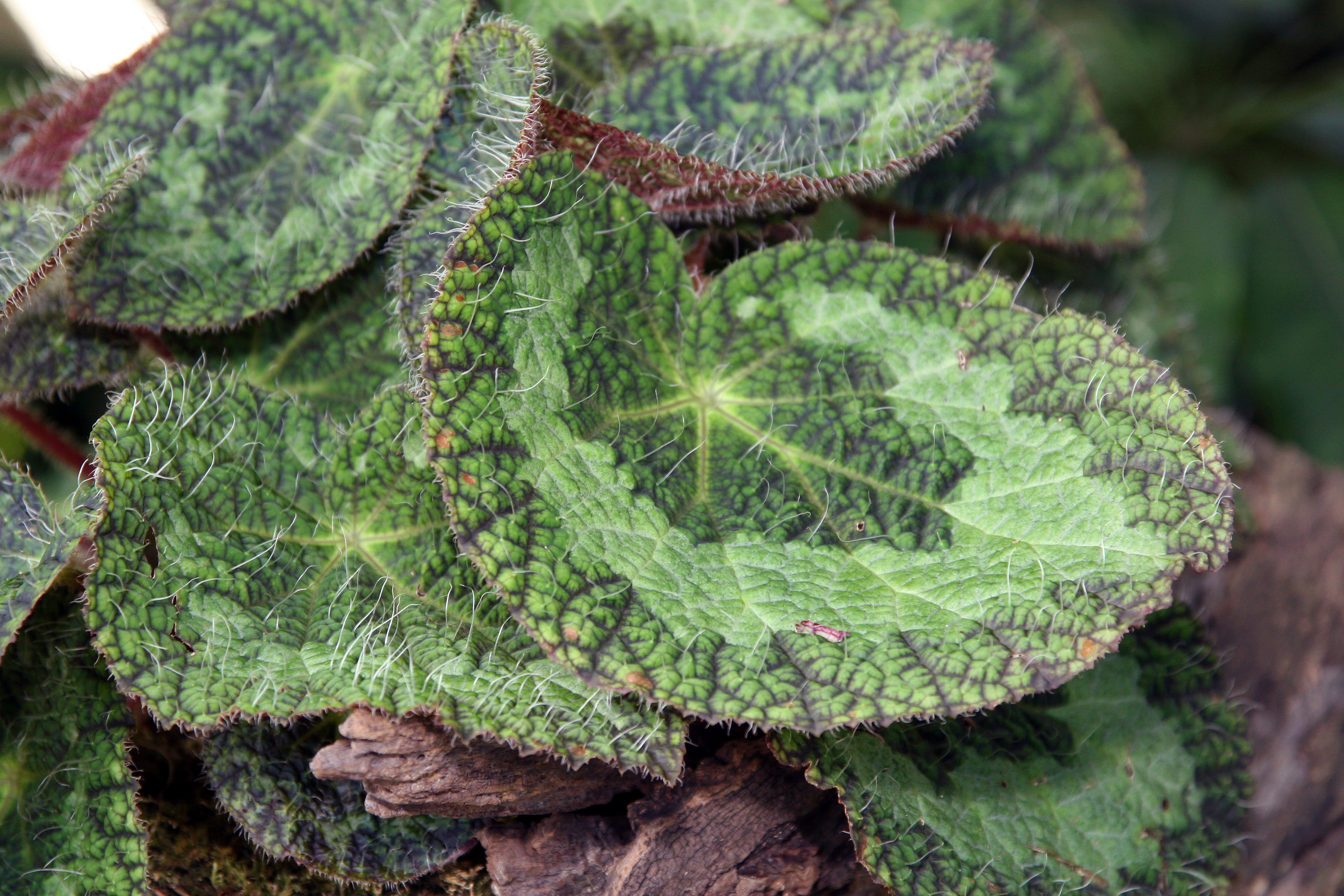
- Leaves

Scientific classification
- Kingdom: Plantae
- Clade: Tracheophytes
- Clade: Angiosperms
- Clade: Eudicots
- Clade: Rosids
- Order: Cucurbitales
- Family: Begoniaceae
- Genus: Begonia
- Species: B. longiciliata

Binomial name
- Begonia longiciliata C.Y.Wu

Synonyms
- Begonia sizemoreae Kiew 2004

= Begonia longiciliata =

Species of flowering plant

Begonia longiciliata is a species of flowering plant in the family Begoniaceae, found in Laos and Vietnam, and Yunnan, Guizhou, Guangxi provinces of China. It is a rhizomatous geophyte with pink flowers and long white hairs on the tops and bottoms of the leave. It is popular in cultivation.

Begonia longiciliata was first collected in 1936, 1958, and 1960, and then documented in 1995 by Wu Cheng-yhi and Ku Tsue-chih. The specific epithet refers to the long, fibre-like hairs found on the adaxial leaf surface of the type specimen. However, not all specimens have hairy leaves.

== Taxonomy ==
A Begonia specimen was collected in Vietnam along the Red River on November 6, 1996 by Mary Sizemore, about 300 miles from where Wu Cheng-yhi had documented Begonia longiciliata. In 2000, Sizemore's specimen was added to the American Begonia Society's Unidentified Species Listing, where it was designated B. U388. In 2004, it was named Begonia sizemoreae in honor of Sizemore, though it was noted in the publication that others thought B. U388 was not a new species, but a specimen of Begonia longiciliata. In 2020, Begonia sizemoreae was recognized to be a synonym of Begonia longiciliata.
