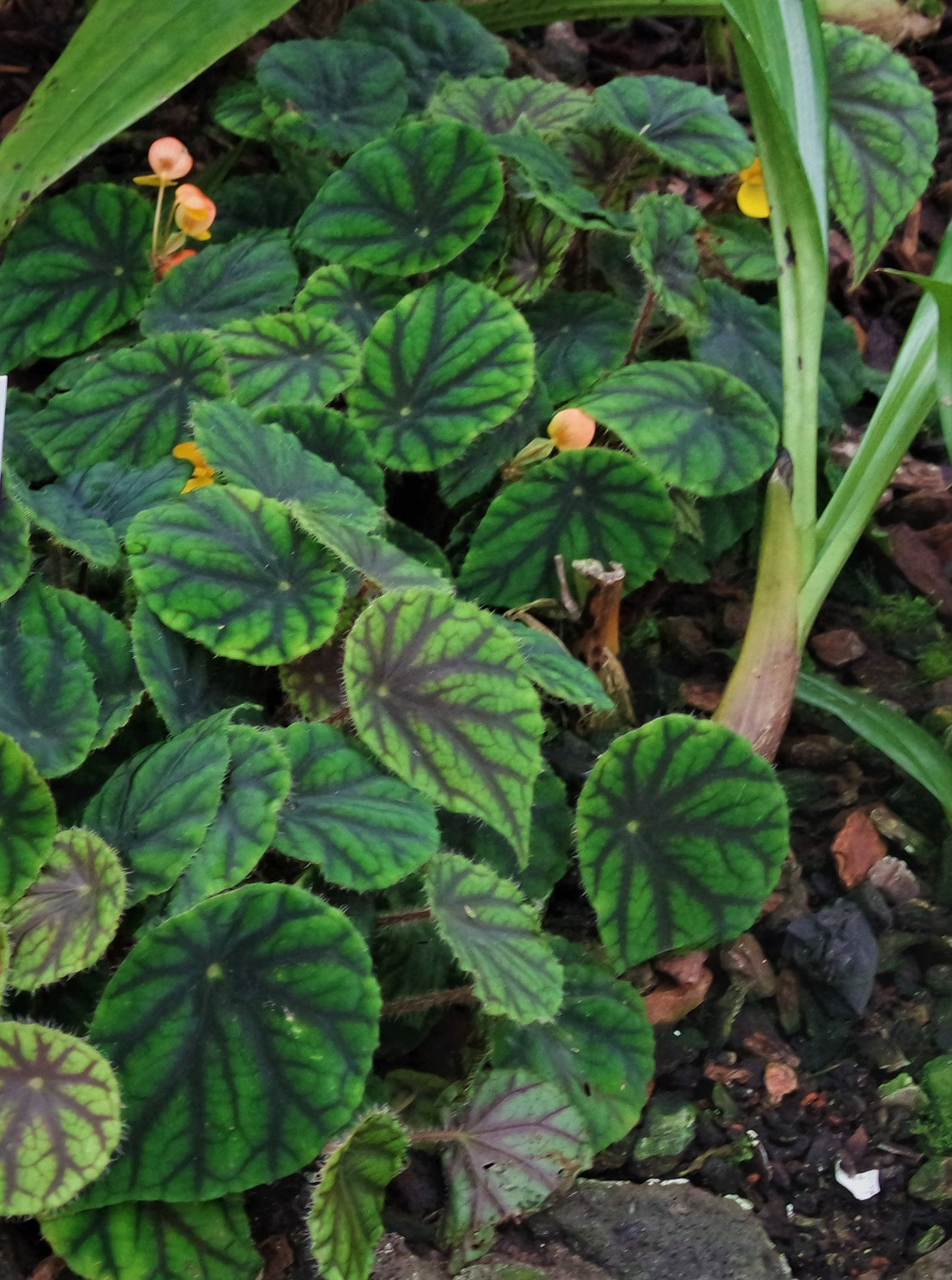
- Begonia quadrialata ssp. nimbaensis

Scientific classification
- Kingdom: Plantae
- Clade: Tracheophytes
- Clade: Angiosperms
- Clade: Eudicots
- Clade: Rosids
- Order: Cucurbitales
- Family: Begoniaceae
- Genus: Begonia
- Species: B. quadrialata

Binomial name
- Begonia quadrialata Warb.

Synonyms
- Begonia calabarica Stapf; Begonia whytei Stapf; Begonia modica Stapf; Begonia poikilantha Gilg ex Engl.

= Begonia quadrialata =

Species of flowering plant

Begonia quadrialata is a species of flowering plant in the family Begoniaceae, with a native range from central Tropical Africa down to Angola, including Mount Nimba. It has a rhizomatous growth habit, ovate, lime-green leaves, sometimes with thick red venation, and yellow to orange-yellow flowers. It is a relatively small plant that grows best in higher humidity, making it suitable for terrariums. A molecular phylogenetic analysis published in 2004 indicates that B. quadrialata is most closely related to B. potamophila.
