= Logee's Plants =

Logee’s Plants is a historic plant nursery and commercial greenhouse that sells by mail order and through a storefront in Danielson, Connecticut. Logee’s was founded in 1892, making it one of the oldest continually running commercial greenhouses in the United States. They specialize in tropical fruiting and flowering plants marketed as houseplants, including many rare varieties that are not available widely in the American plant trade.

== History ==
Logee’s was founded in 1892 by William D. Logee as a cut flower business in Danielson, Connecticut. While operating his flower business, William took an interest in rare tropical plants and began collecting and propagating them in a greenhouse which still stands on the property today, known as the fern house. Notably, he purchased a Ponderosa lemon tree in 1900, which he planted directly into the ground in the middle of the fern house where it still stands. William Logee had 13 children, some of which took to their own interests in horticulture. In the early 20th century, Earnest Logee, the eldest son, cultivated over 400 varieties of Begonia at the greenhouse, including many that he hybridized himself. Earnest was also a founding member of the American Begonia Society. Logee’s began its mail order program in the 1930s, which was a way for the business to reach audiences beyond Danielson, Connecticut. The business still maintains a mail order catalog and now an online store today.

In 1952, William Logee passed away and the business passed into the ownership of Joy Logee Martin, one of William’s daughters, and Ernest Martin, her husband. Joy specialized in herbs and geraniums, but maintained Logee’s legacy of fruit plants and begonias. Joy’s son, Byron Martin, and Laurelynn Glass Martin are the owners today.
