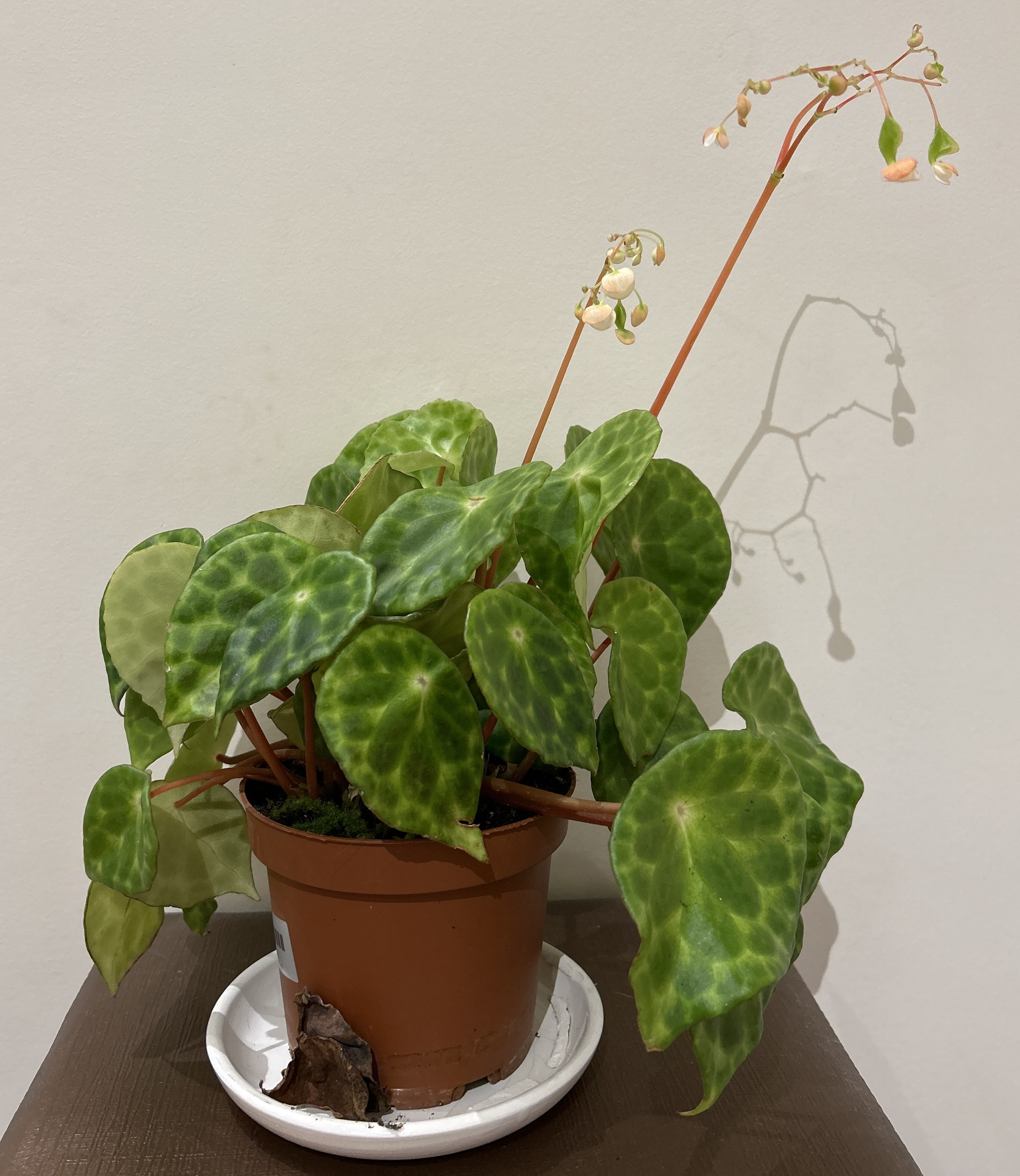

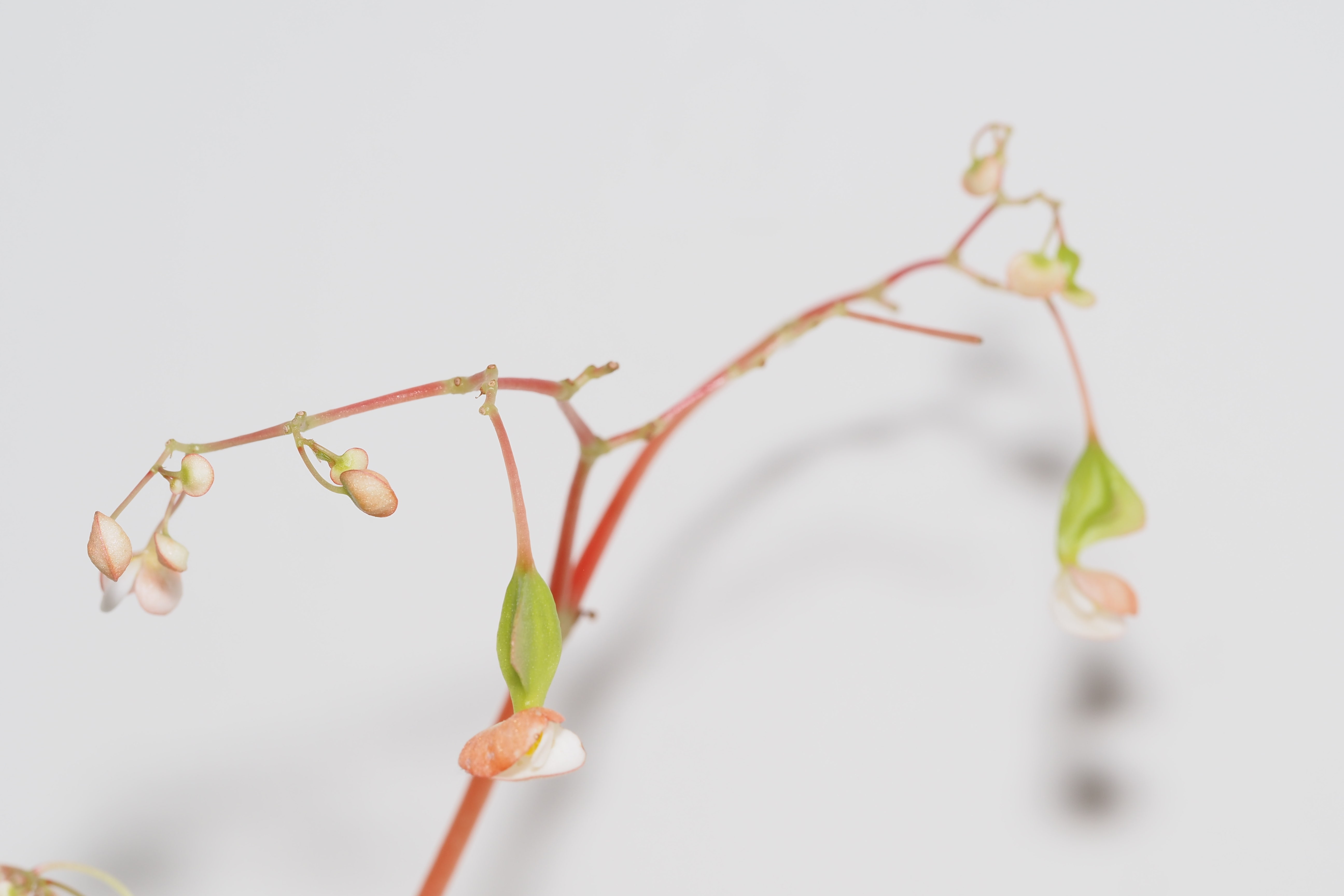
- Cyme inflorescence

Scientific classification
- Kingdom: Plantae
- Clade: Embryophytes
- Clade: Tracheophytes
- Clade: Spermatophytes
- Clade: Angiosperms
- Clade: Eudicots
- Clade: Rosids
- Order: Cucurbitales
- Family: Begoniaceae
- Genus: Begonia
- Species: B. kingiana

Binomial name
- Begonia kingiana Irmsch.

Synonyms
- Begonia hasskarlii sensu King

= Begonia kingiana =

Species of flowering plant

Begonia kingiana, also known as the tortoise shell begonia, is a species of lithophytic flowering plant in the family Begoniaceae found in Peninsular Malaysia and Peninsular Thailand. It was described by Edgar Irmscher in 1929.

== Description ==
Begonia kingiana is a creeping rhizomatous herb. Rhizomes are elongate, glabrous (hairless), around 30 cm long and 4–5 mm in diameter. Stipules are reddish and without hairs. Leaves are ovate to oval in shape, asymmetric, peltate, succulent and glabrous on both sides. The base of the leaves are obliquely rounded, the tips of the leaves are tail-like, and the margins are mostly smooth and regular. Venation is palmate, with 7–9 branched lateral veins that are slightly impressed above and prominent beneath. These leaves can vary in appearance, from green, plain dull dark green, grey-green or almost black in color dorsally with visible veins on the surface and white, pale red or red in color beneath to being variegated brownish between paler veins from above and purple beneath. Inflorescences arise from the rhizome and are bisexual, with male and female flowers growing on the same place on the plant (monoecy). Inflorescences are also protandrous; male flowers bloom earlier than female flowers. Male flower buds were observed requiring 12 days to fully open where they then drop off after three days. Female flowers, however, take around 15 days and last approximately three to six days, leaving a nine day gap between the male and female flowers. Male flowers have pedicels that are 8−10 mm long and have four tepals, with the outer two tepals ovate to orbicular in shape, having a length of 4−5 mm and a width of 4−6 mm. The inner two tepals are oblanceolate, with a length of 15 mm and a width of 3 mm. Stamens are numerous, around 1 mm long, and fused at the base. Conversely, female flowers have 5−10 mm long pedicels, with four uneven glabrous tepals. The outer two tepals are ovate, around 4−5 mm long and 5−6 mm wide. The inner two tepals are white, oblanceolate, and 5 mm by 2 mm wide. Each flower has three styles that are fused at the base. Flowers are variable in color, ranging from pale pink to pink, greenish pink, light green, pale green to bright red. Fruits are dehiscent capsules that contain brown, barrel-shaped seeds.

== Habitat and ecology ==
In Peninsular Malaysia, Begonia kingiana is distributed widely throughout the region, albeit confined to limestone cliffs where it is often found growing in partial shade and cool humid conditions. Natural populations of this species are found from northern states like Kedah (Langkawi Island) and Perak, the eastern states of Kelantan and Terengganu, to as far south as the states of Pahang and Selangor.

However, in Thailand, particularly Peninsular Thailand, it is found growing on granitic rocks in seasonally dry evergreen forests at an altitude of around 200 m. It is recorded to flower in June and fruit in November.

=== Threats ===
B. kingiana is threatened by limestone quarrying for cement and marble, including clearing of land via burning for agriculture or development. It is classified as endangered by the Forest Research Institute of Malaysia.

== Taxonomy and nomenclature ==
Begonia kingiana is a member of Begonia sect. Ridleyella and was described in 1929 by German botanist Edgar Irmscher in the publication Mitteilungen aus dem Institut für Allgemeine Botanik in Hamburg. The specific epithet, kingiana, is named after Sir George King, the superintendent of the Royal Botanic Garden in Calcutta, India from 1871-1898.

B. kingiana is phylogenetically sister to Begonia speluncae.

== Gallery ==
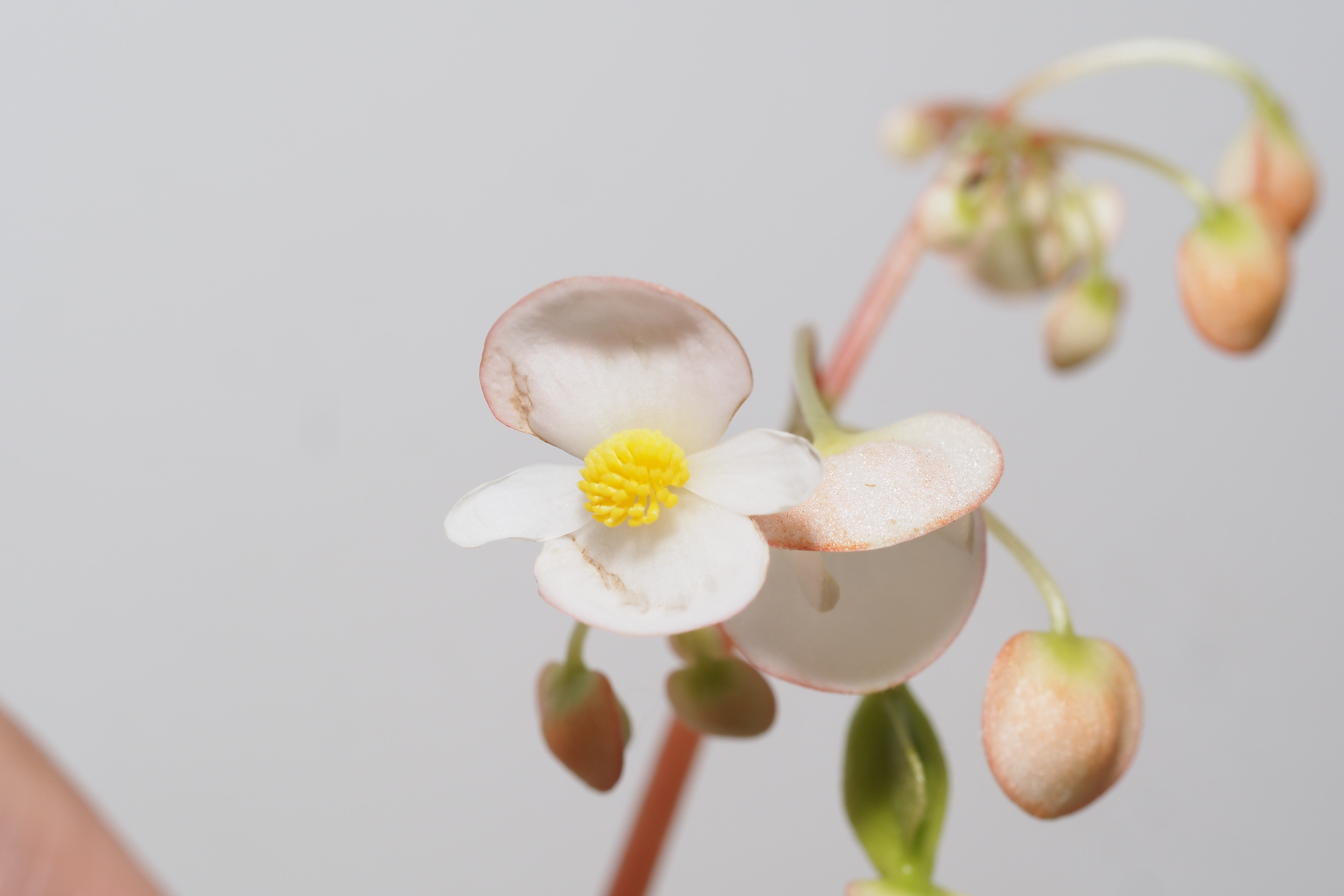
Male flower

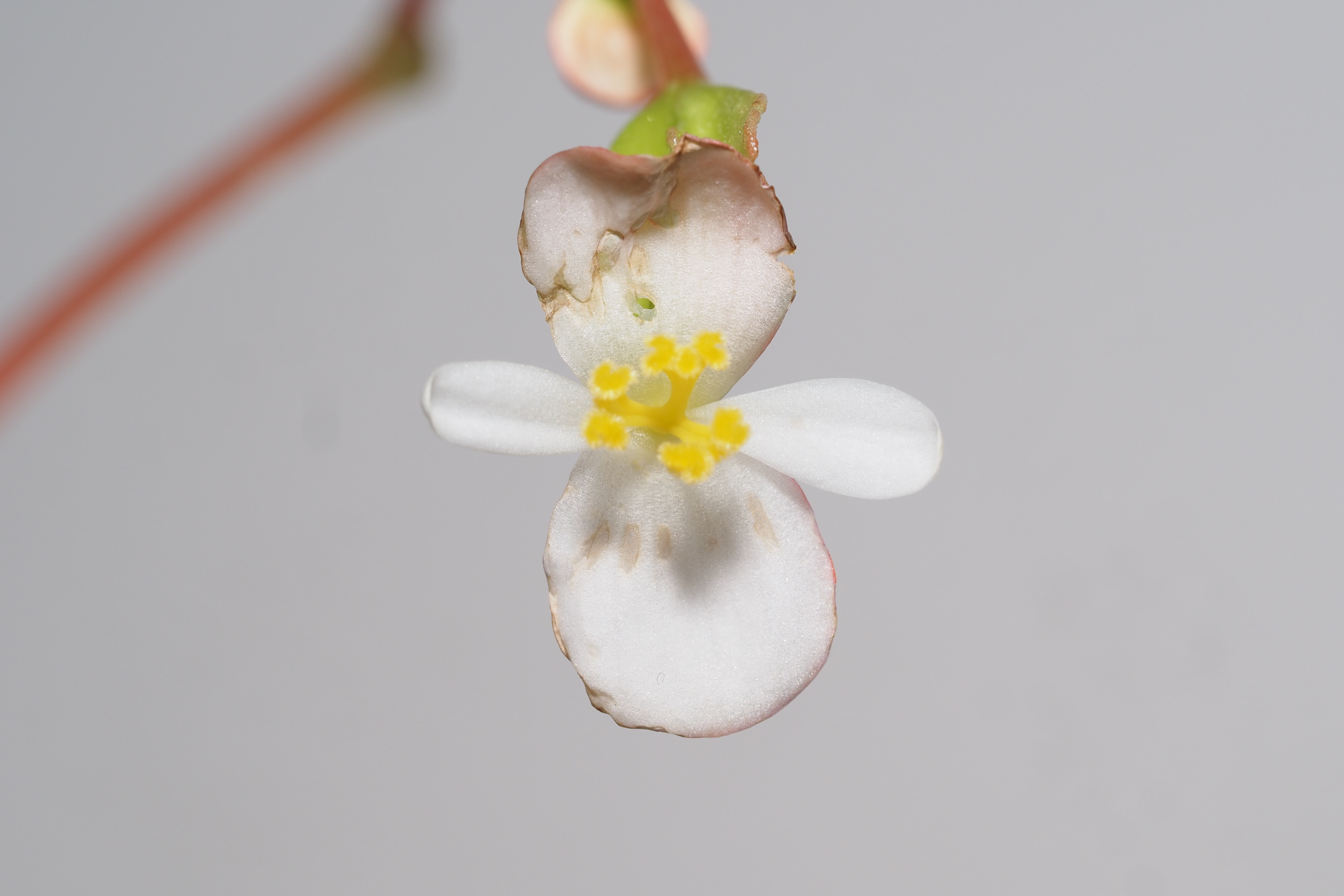
Female flower
