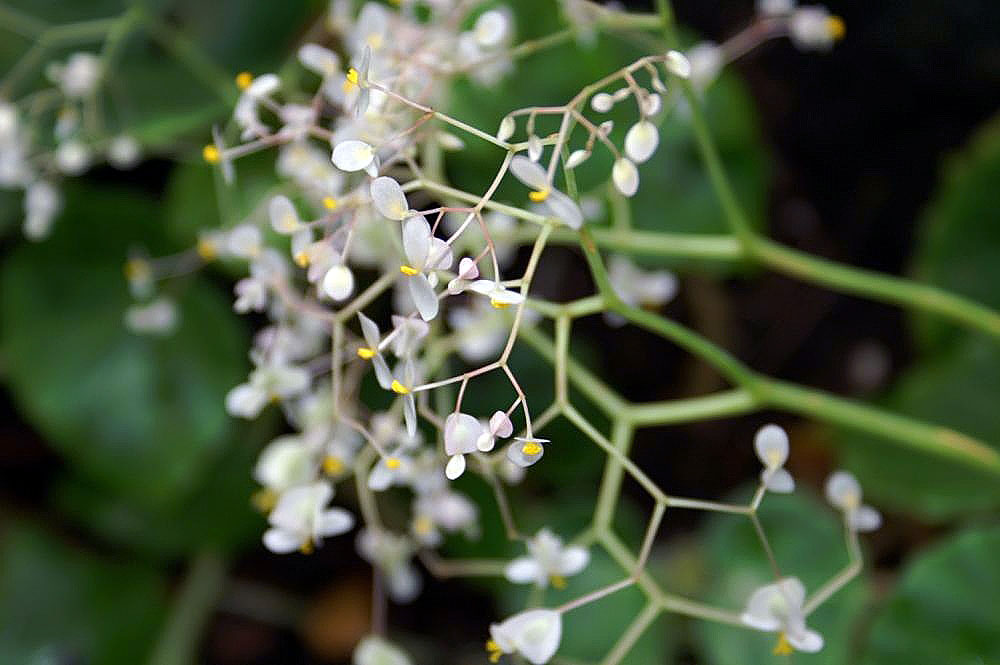
- Close-up of white flowers, which can be pink in some specimens
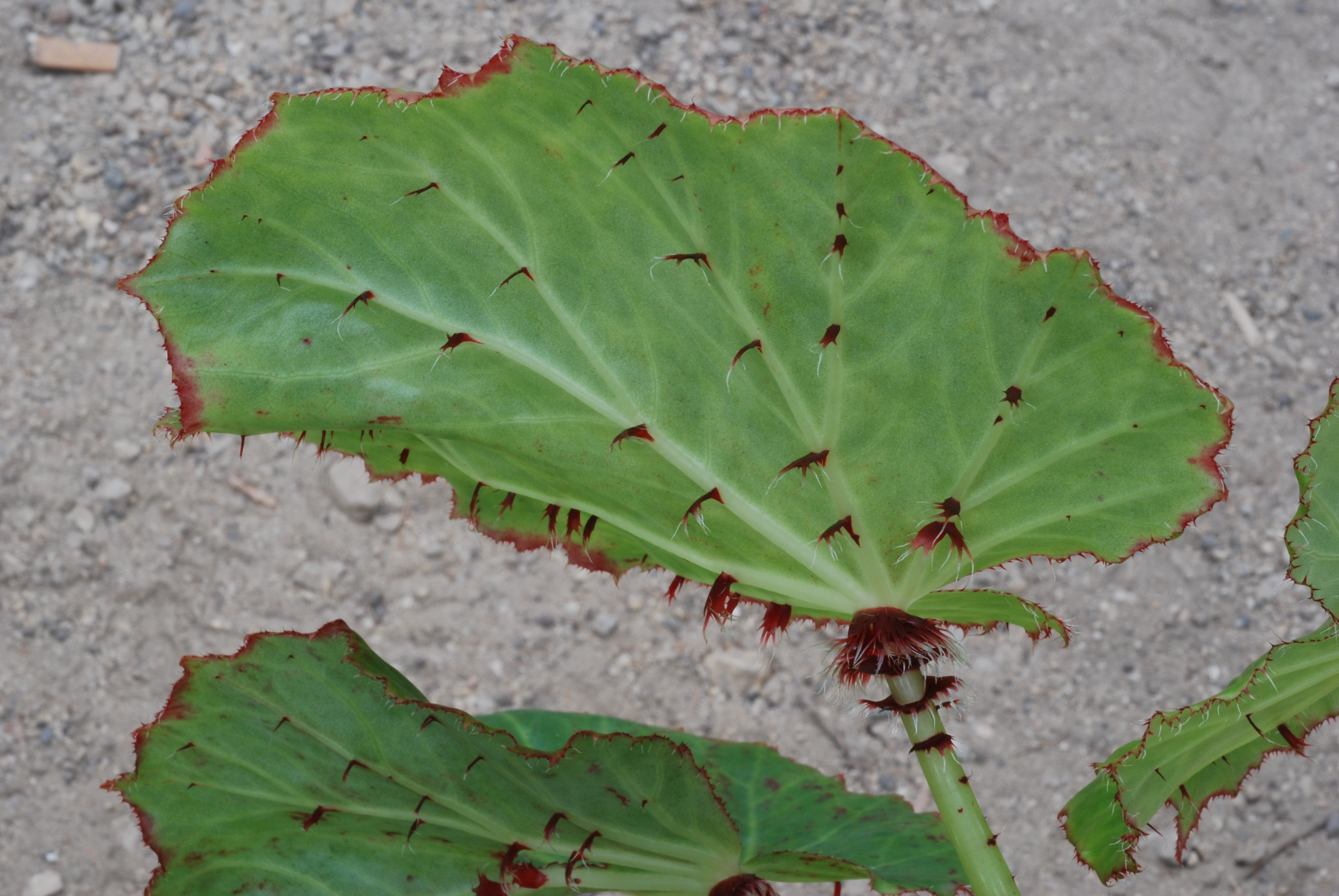
- Close-up of leaf

Scientific classification
- Kingdom: Plantae
- Clade: Tracheophytes
- Clade: Angiosperms
- Clade: Eudicots
- Clade: Rosids
- Order: Cucurbitales
- Family: Begoniaceae
- Genus: Begonia
- Species: B. manicata

Binomial name
- Begonia manicata Brongn.

Synonyms
- List: Begonia lepidota Liebm.; Begonia manicata var. aureomaculata Ziesenh.; Begonia manicata var. manicativiridi Ziesenh.; Begonia manicata var. ocozocoautlaensis Ziesenh.; Begonia manicata var. peltata A.C.Sm. & Schub.; Begonia robustior Standl. & L.O.Williams; Begonia schizolepis Liebm.; Gireoudia manicata (Brongn.) Klotzsch; Gireoudia schizolepis (Liebm.) Klotzsch

= Begonia manicata =

Species of flowering plant

Begonia manicata is a species of flowering plant in the family Begoniaceae, native to Mexico and Central America. It was collected from the Veracruz moist forests by Jean Jules Linden, and later described in 1842. The variety 'Aureo-maculata' has cream variegations in the foliage, and is called the leopard begonia.

Though it is an upright rhizomatous begonia, so the rhizome grows upwards instead of along the ground. When full-grown, the leaves can grow to 7 or more inches across. The flowers, which can be pink or white, appear in the winter.

The specific epithet manicata means "cuff", and refers to the bands of red hairs at the end of each petiole. In the varietal cognomen, aureo is from aureus, which means "golden", and maculata means "spotted."

Begonia manicata has been used extensively in hybridization. In particular, it is the male parent of the cultivar B. 'Erythrophylla', (the beefsteak begonia) and the female parent of the cultivar B. 'Verschaffeltii.'
