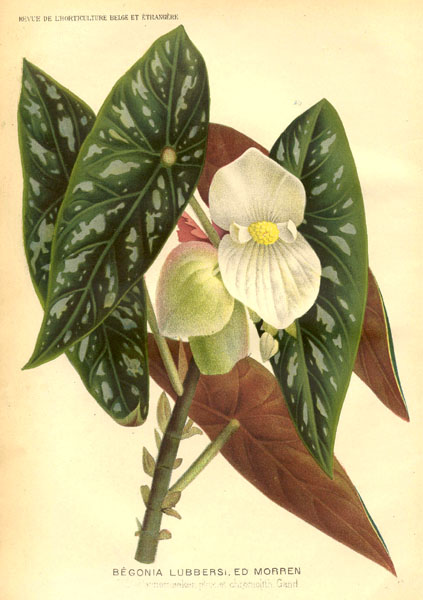
- Begonia lubbersii illustrated by Pieter De Pannemaeker for Revue de l'Horticulture Belge et Étrangère (Journal of Belgian and Foreign Horticulture)

Scientific classification
- Kingdom: Plantae
- Clade: Tracheophytes
- Clade: Angiosperms
- Clade: Eudicots
- Clade: Rosids
- Order: Cucurbitales
- Family: Begoniaceae
- Genus: Begonia
- Species: B. lubbersii

Binomial name
- Begonia lubbersii É.Morren

= Begonia lubbersii =

Species of flowering plant

Begonia lubbersii is a species of flowering plant in the family Begoniaceae, native to the Atlantic Forest region of Brazil. It was discovered by and named for Belgian Botanist Louis Lubbers. It is a type of cane begonia with oblong rhomboid leaves. The large green, pink and white flowers have a lasting fragrance.
