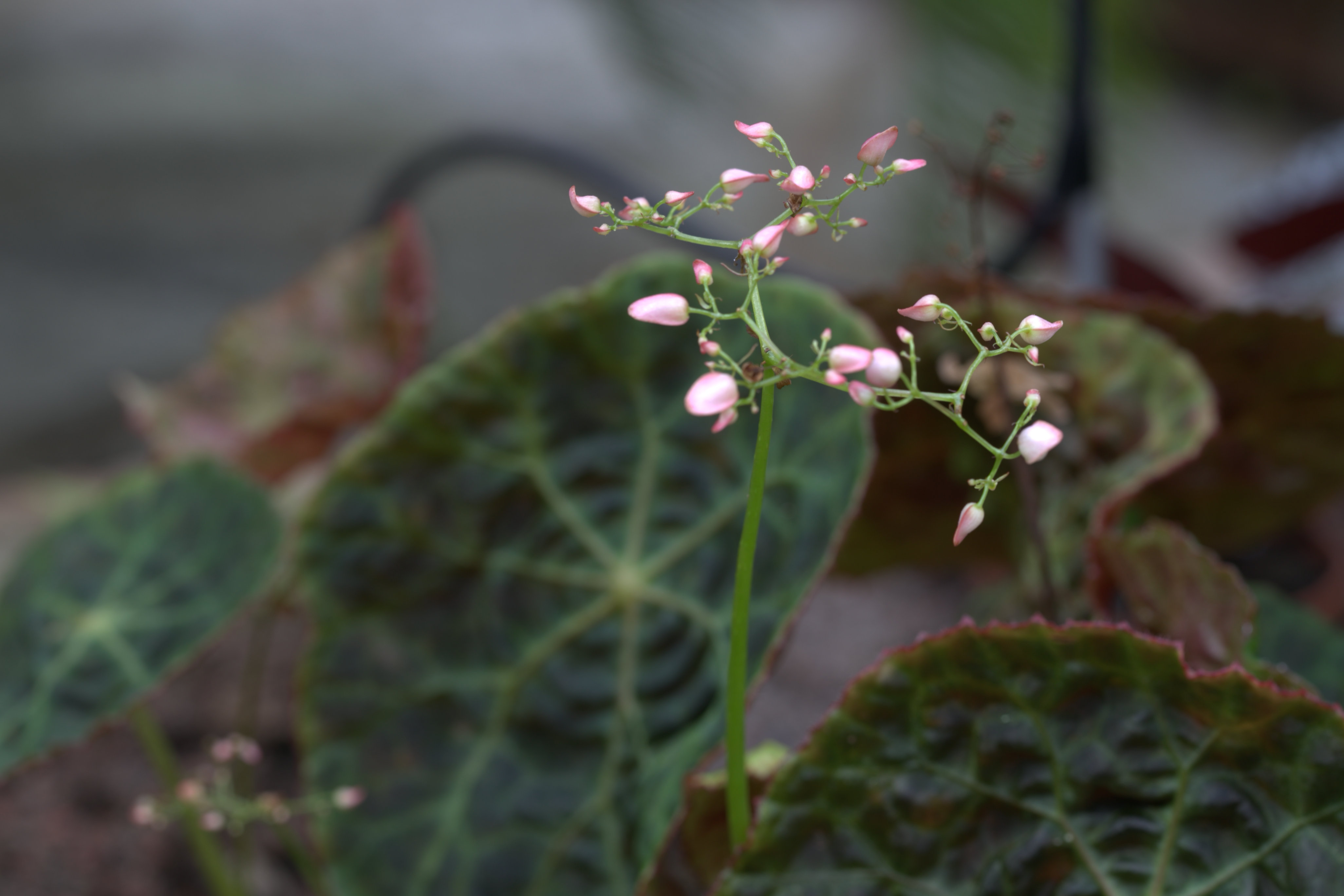
- Inflorescence
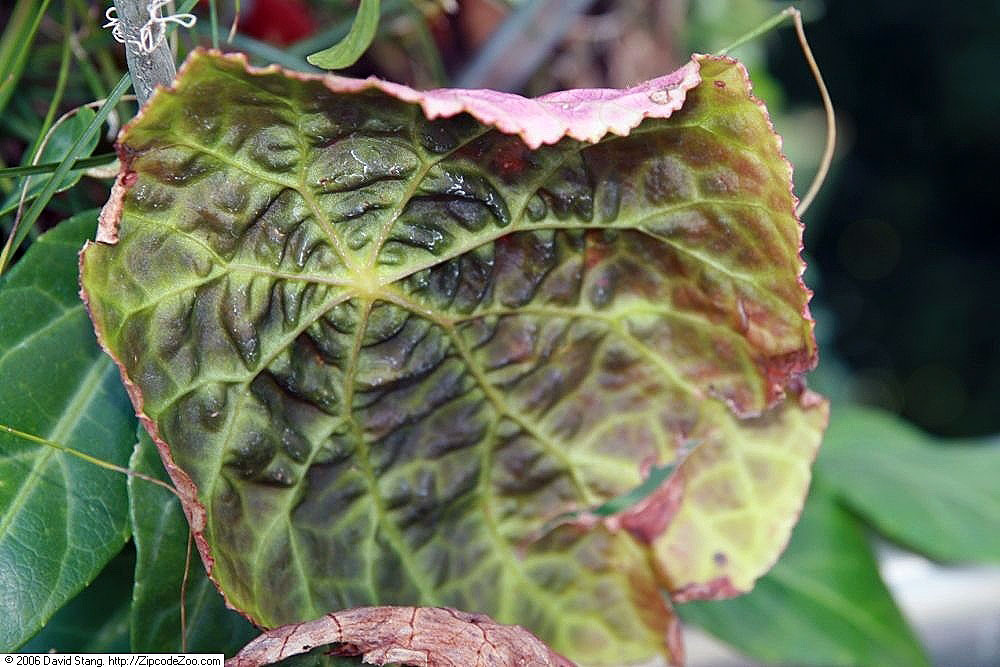
- Leaf with typical circular wrinkles

Scientific classification
- Kingdom: Plantae
- Clade: Tracheophytes
- Clade: Angiosperms
- Clade: Eudicots
- Clade: Rosids
- Order: Cucurbitales
- Family: Begoniaceae
- Genus: Begonia
- Species: B. goegoensis

Binomial name
- Begonia goegoensis N.E.Br.

= Begonia goegoensis =

Species of flowering plant

Begonia goegoensis, the fire-king begonia, is a species of flowering plant in the family Begoniaceae, native to Sumatra. In 1882 it was exhibited by Veitch and Sons and received a first class certificate from the Royal Horticultural Society. Valued for its striking red-backed leaves, it can be propagated from cuttings, although seeds may do better.
