= Rhizomatous begonia =

Group of plant cultivars

Rhizomatous Begonia
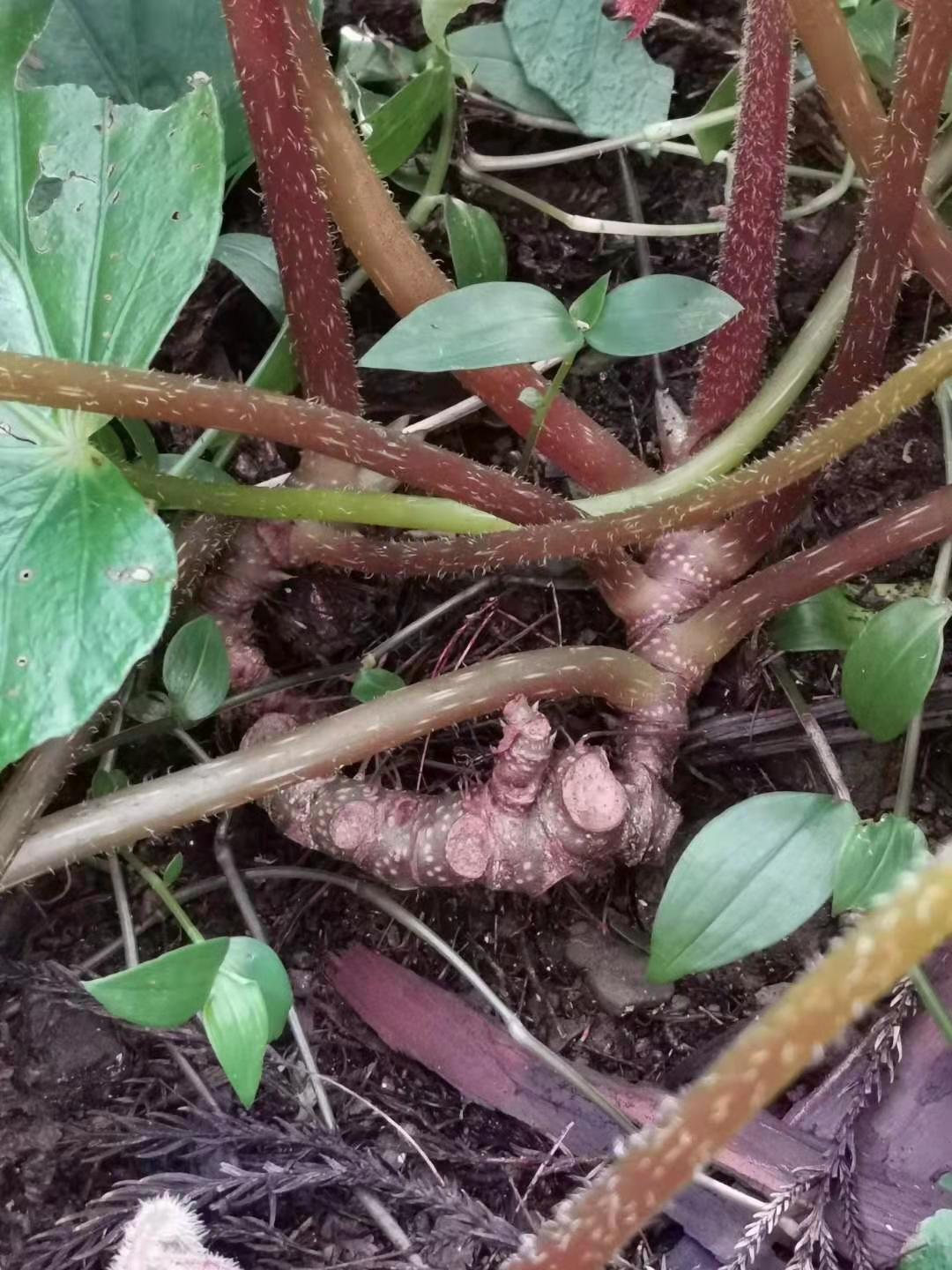
- The rhizome of Begonia chitoensis
- Genus: Begonia

Rhizomatous is an informal classification of Begonia, characterized by the rhizome from which they grow. The rhizome is a horizontally growing stem that grows along or just under the soil, with nodes that can put out roots and leaves. The plants usually grow in a ball shape, with the appearance of a mound of leaves. There are more than 700 known species, and hundreds of named and unnamed cultivars, making them the largest Begonia group in cultivation. They grow naturally in Mexico, Central and South America, and Asia.

Rhizomatous begonias are cultivated for their foliage, which comes in a wide range of colors (green, black, silver, brown), shapes, patterns, and size. They grow naturally in shallow leaf litter and dappled sunlight.

== Sub-categories ==
Horticulturally, there are dozens of subcategories based on leaf size and growth. Like other categories of Begonia, these don't have rigorous scientific definitions, but are used more generally to group cultivars with similar characteristics. There are four visually distinct rhizomatous types listed in Brad's Begonia World.

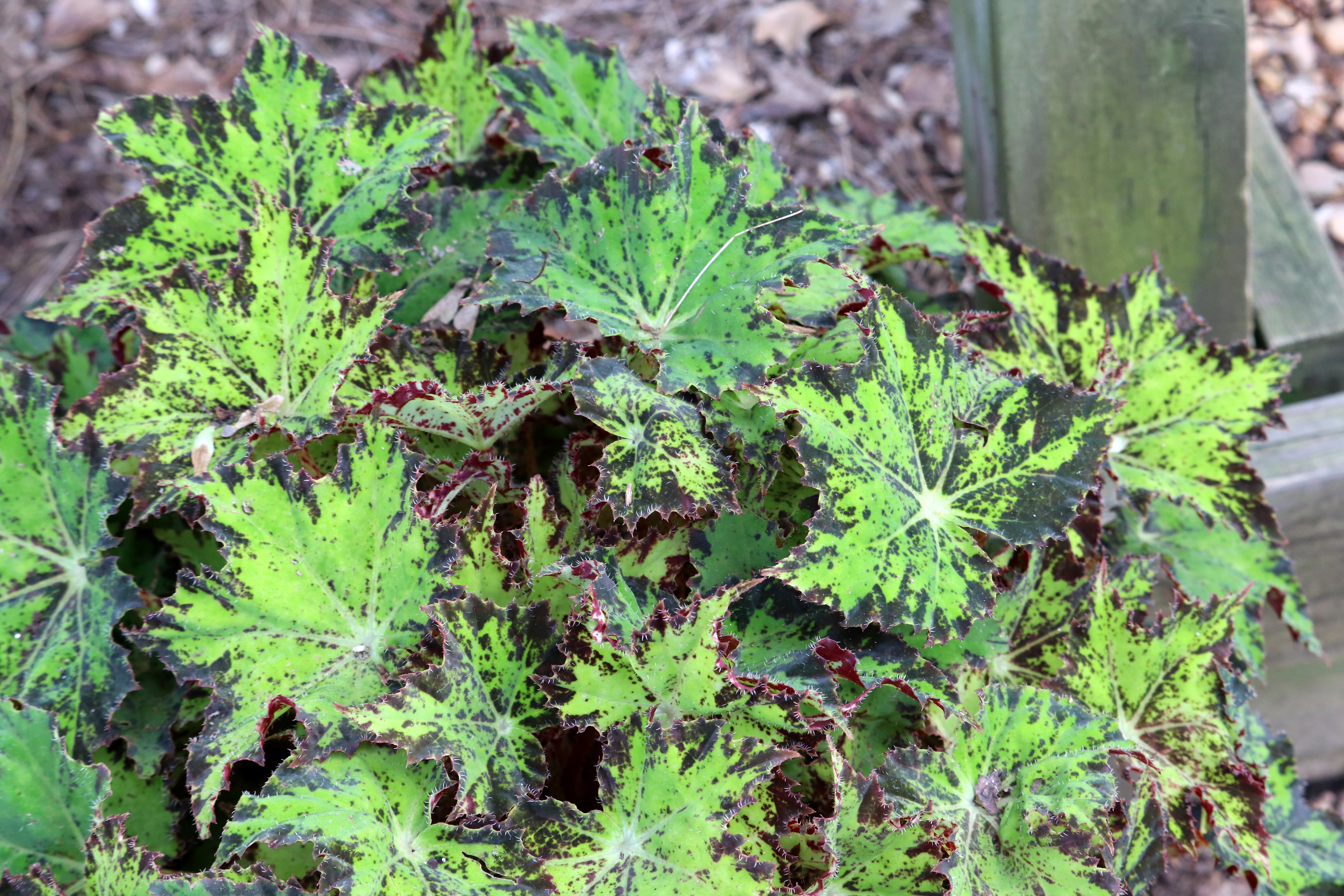
Begonia 'Cleopatra' is a common rhizomatous Begonia.

=== Common ===
The majority of rhizomatous begonias fall into this category. They range is leaf size from miniature to more than two feet across and come in a wide range of colors. The majority bloom in the spring, and the blooms grow above the foliage. Examples include B. 'Cleopatra' and B. 'Freddie'.

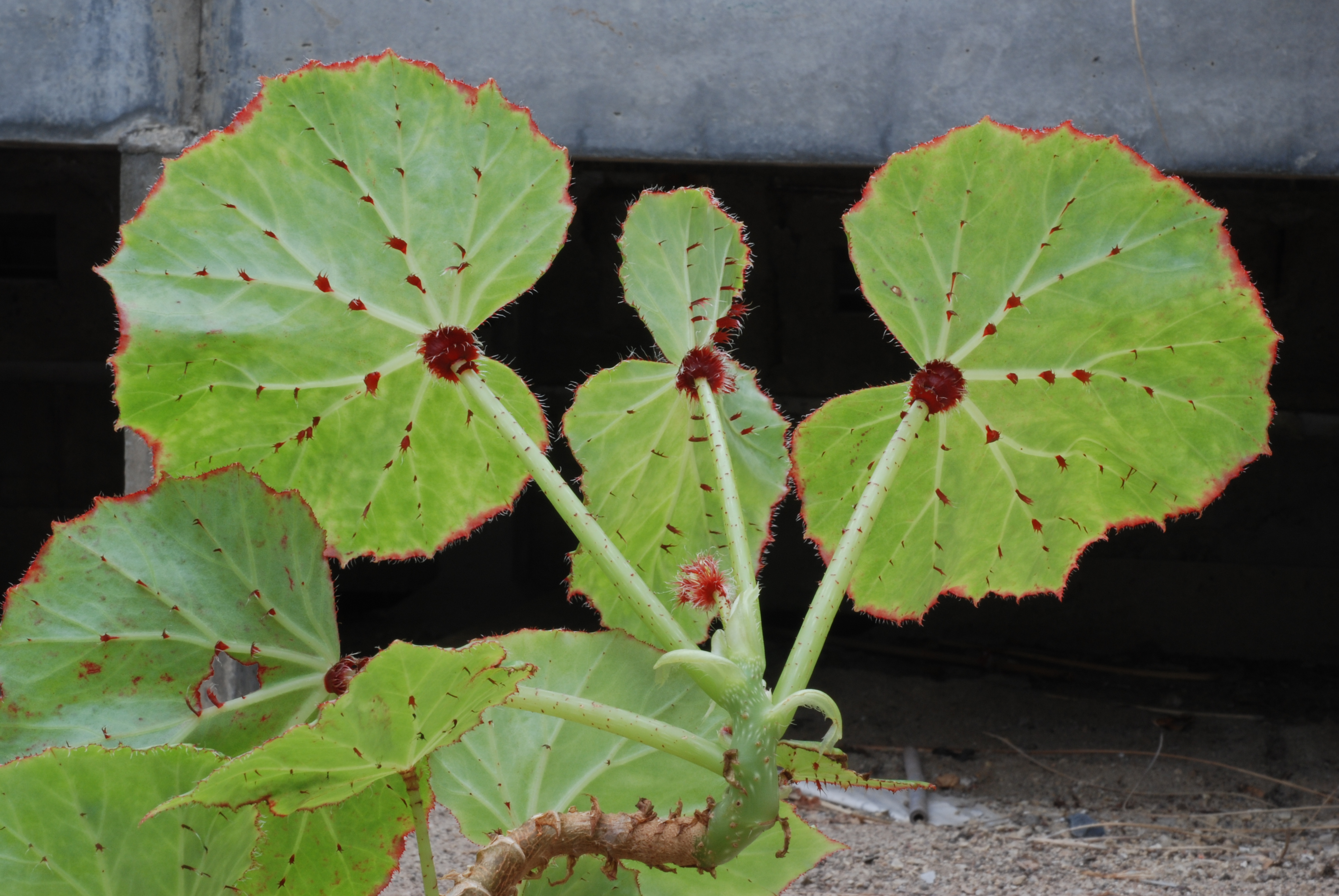
Begonia manicata is an upright rhizomatous Begonia.

=== Upright ===
Despite the name, these begonias are closer to semi-upright. Instead staying on the ground, the rhizomes of these species sprawl upwards (and frequently end up falling back down from their own weight). Most are spring blooming, and some lose their leaves during the winter and flower from bare stems. Begonia crassicaulis is classified as upright in Brad's Begonia World, but it might also be classified as thick-stemmed or even caudiciform. Examples include B. 'Madame Queen' and Begonia manicata.

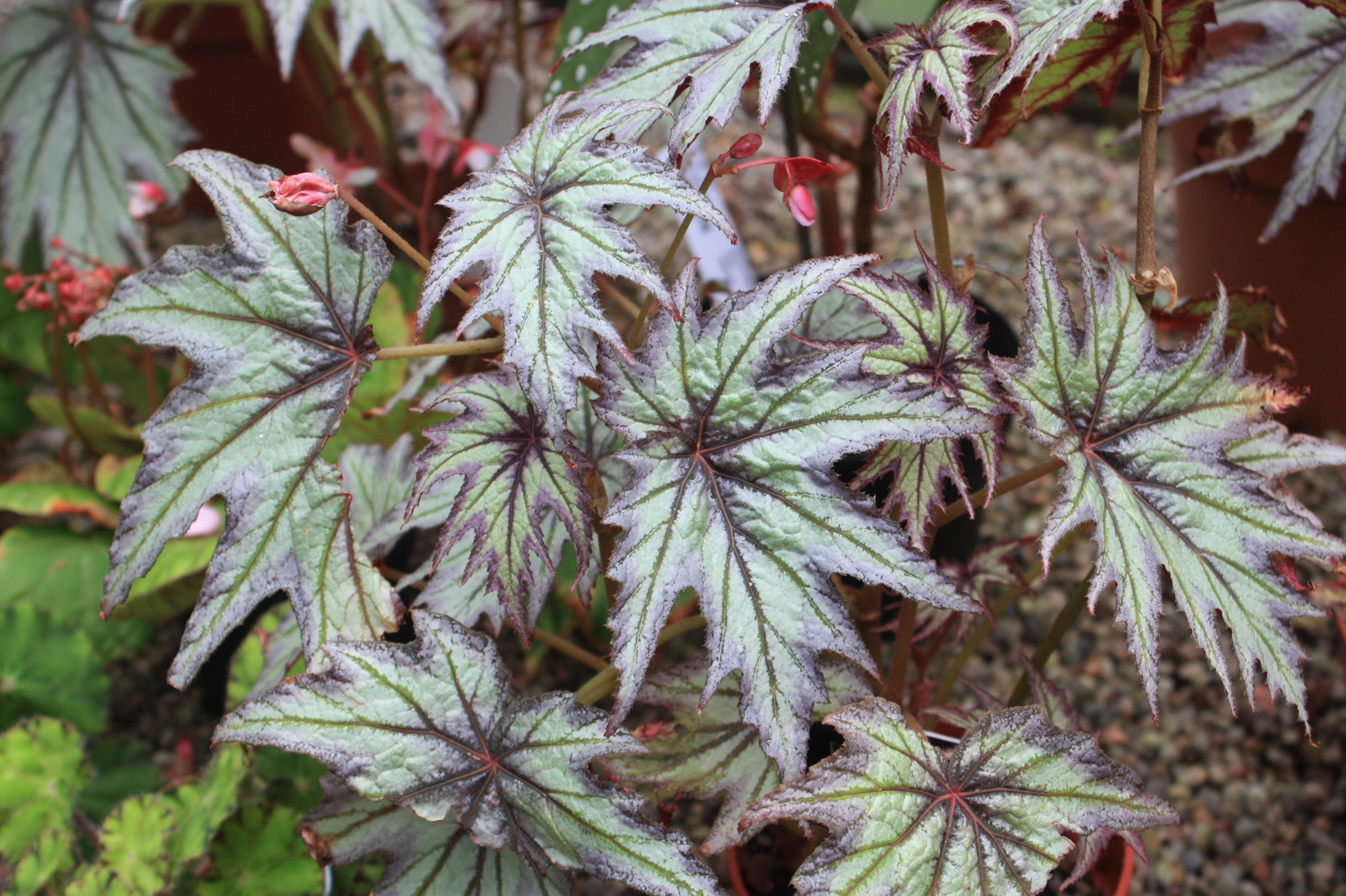
Begonia 'Connee Boswell' is an upright jointed Begonia.

=== Upright Jointed ===
When a species of Begonia grows from an underground rhizome which sends up vertical stems similar to a cane-like Begonia, it is considered Upright Jointed. Instead of growing directly from the rhizome, the leaves and flower grow from the vertical stems. Upright jointed begonias tend to have thin, easily damaged, but very distinctive leaves. Most flower in the summer. Examples include B. 'Connee Boswell' and B. 'Charles Jaros'.

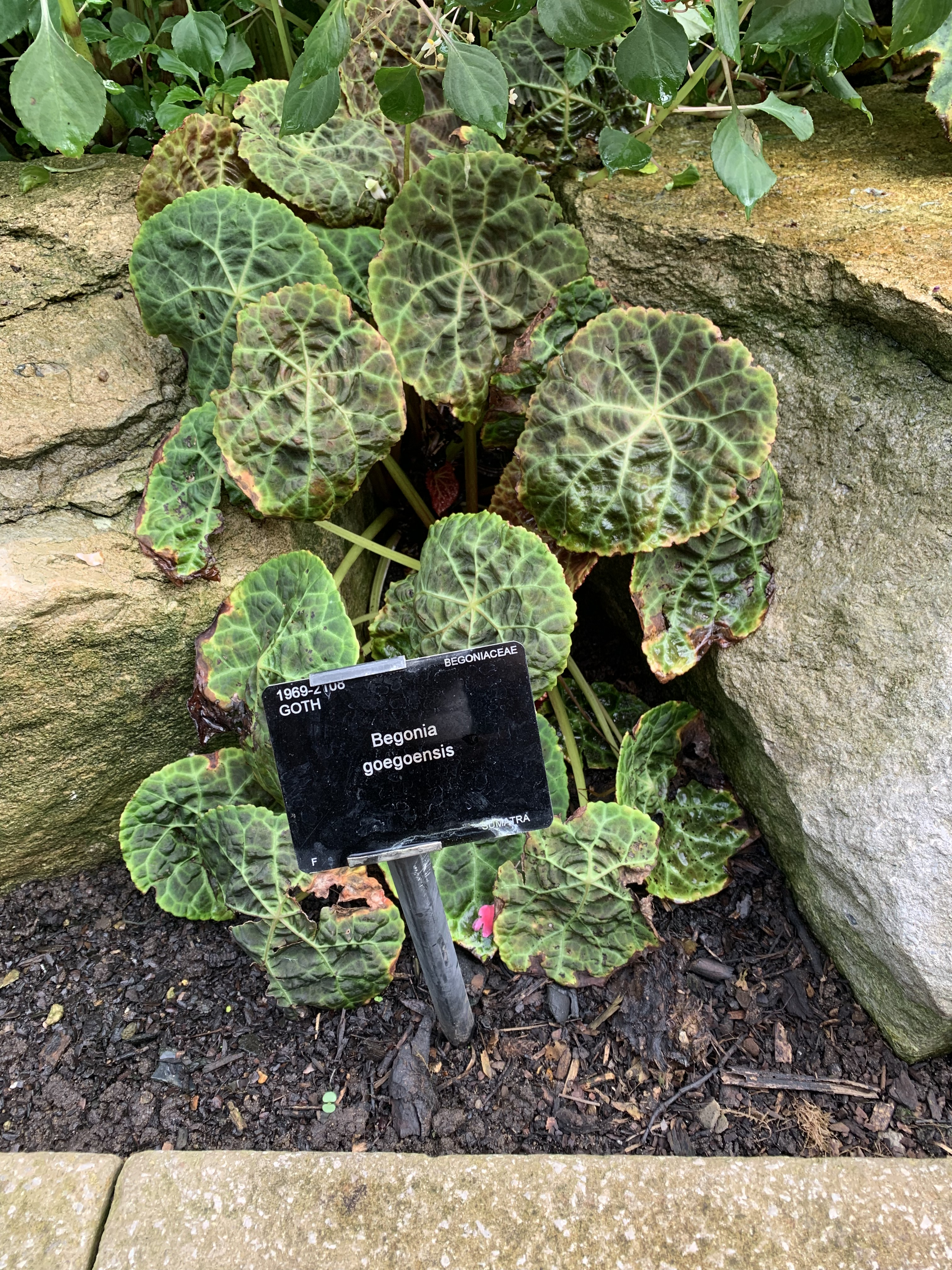
Begonia goegoensis is in the distinctive foliage category.

=== Distinctive Foliage ===
These species are distinguished by their foliage color or texture. They resemble rex begonias, but do not have Begonia rex parentage. Begonia gehrtii and Begonia paulensis fall into this class, though some think these species should be considered shrub-like. Most of the species in this category need very warm, humid conditions. B. 'Silver Jewel', Begonia goegoensis, and B. 'Wanda' are considered Distinctive Foliage begonias.

=== Rex ===
Rex begonias are technically their own class, but they are also rhizomatous.
