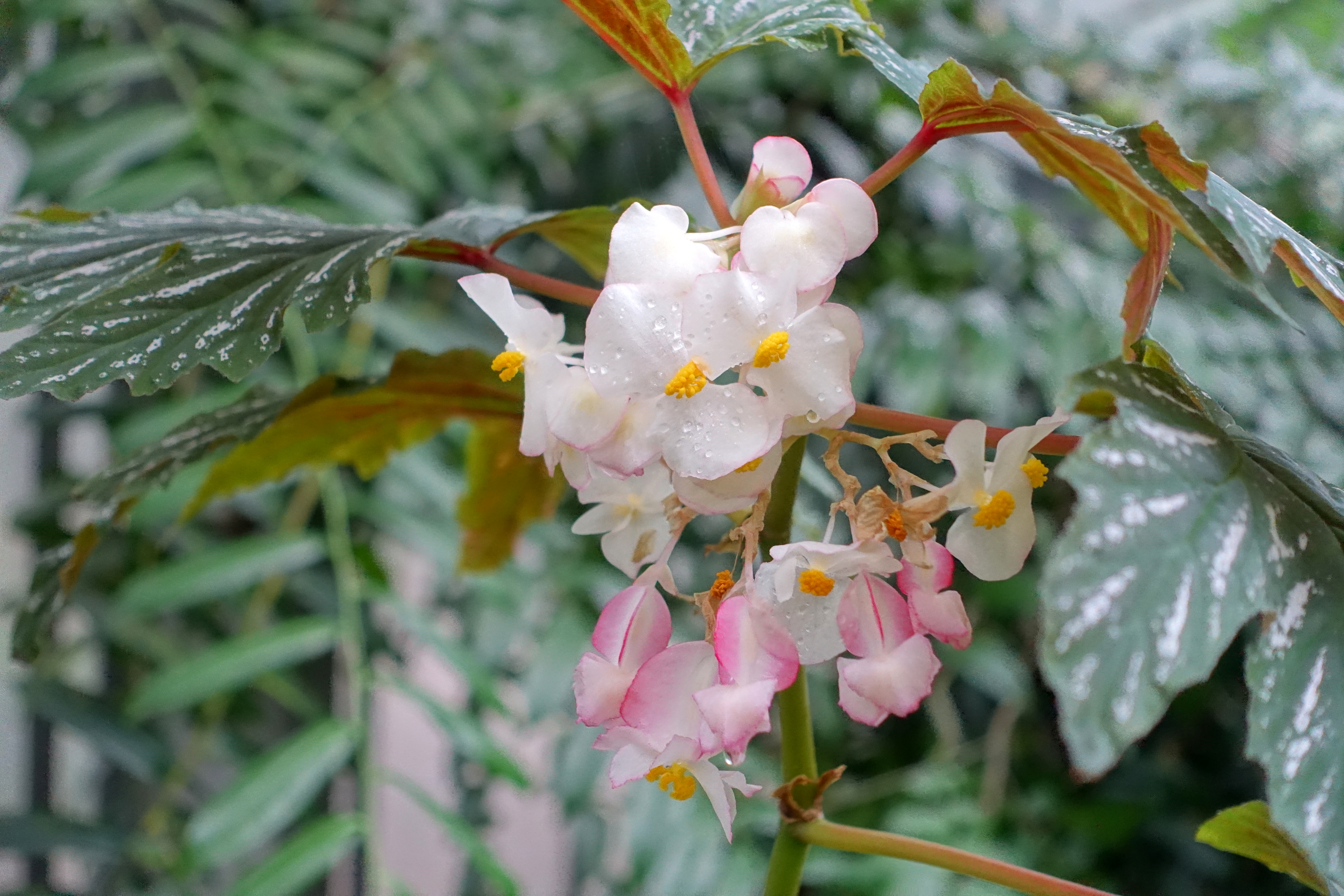

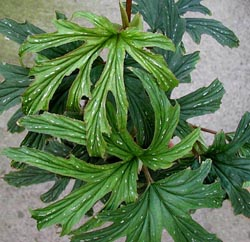

Scientific classification
- Kingdom: Plantae
- Clade: Tracheophytes
- Clade: Angiosperms
- Clade: Eudicots
- Clade: Rosids
- Order: Cucurbitales
- Family: Begoniaceae
- Genus: Begonia
- Species: B. aconitifolia

Binomial name
- Begonia aconitifolia A.DC.

Synonyms
- List: Begonia faureana Garnier; Begonia faureana var. argentea Linden; Begonia faureana var. metallica Rodigas; Begonia kimusiana C.Chev.; Begonia sceptrum Rodigas

= Begonia aconitifolia =

Species of flowering plant

Begonia aconitifolia is a species of plant in the family Begoniaceae, endemic to Brazil. It grows up to 1 meter in height, with panicles of pink flowers.
