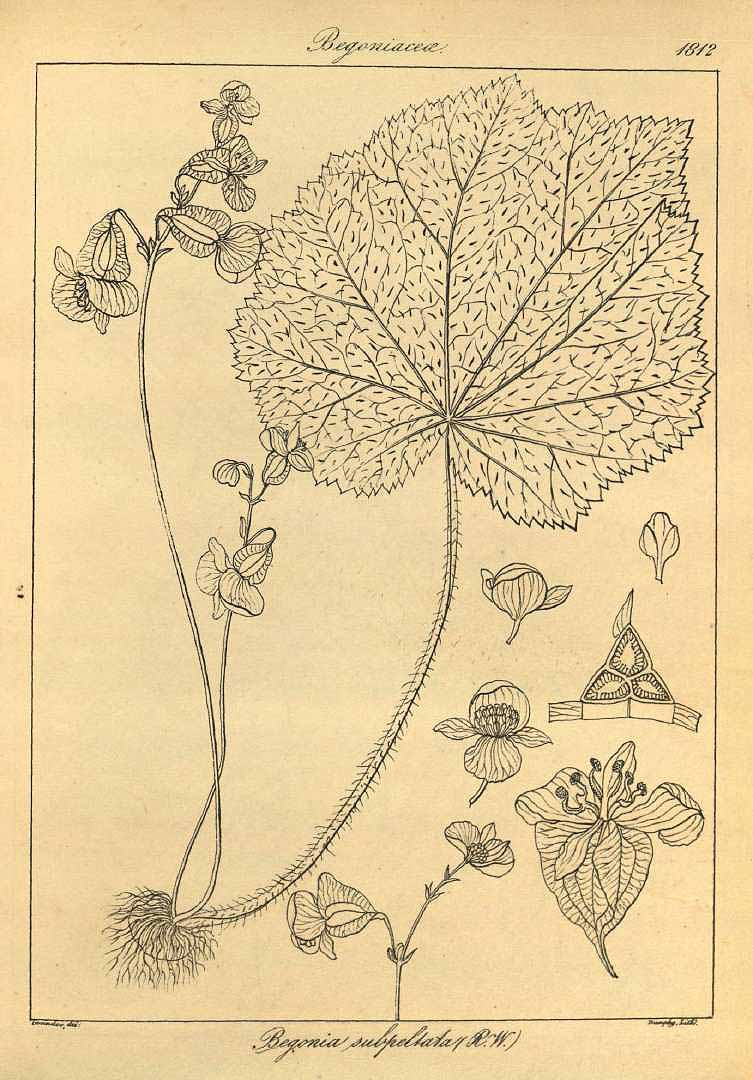

Scientific classification
- Kingdom: Plantae
- Clade: Tracheophytes
- Clade: Angiosperms
- Clade: Eudicots
- Clade: Rosids
- Order: Cucurbitales
- Family: Begoniaceae
- Genus: Begonia
- Species: B. subpeltata

Binomial name
- Begonia subpeltata Wight

= Begonia subpeltata =

Species of flowering plant

Begonia subpeltata is a species of flowering plant in the genus Begonia, native to South India and Sri Lanka.
