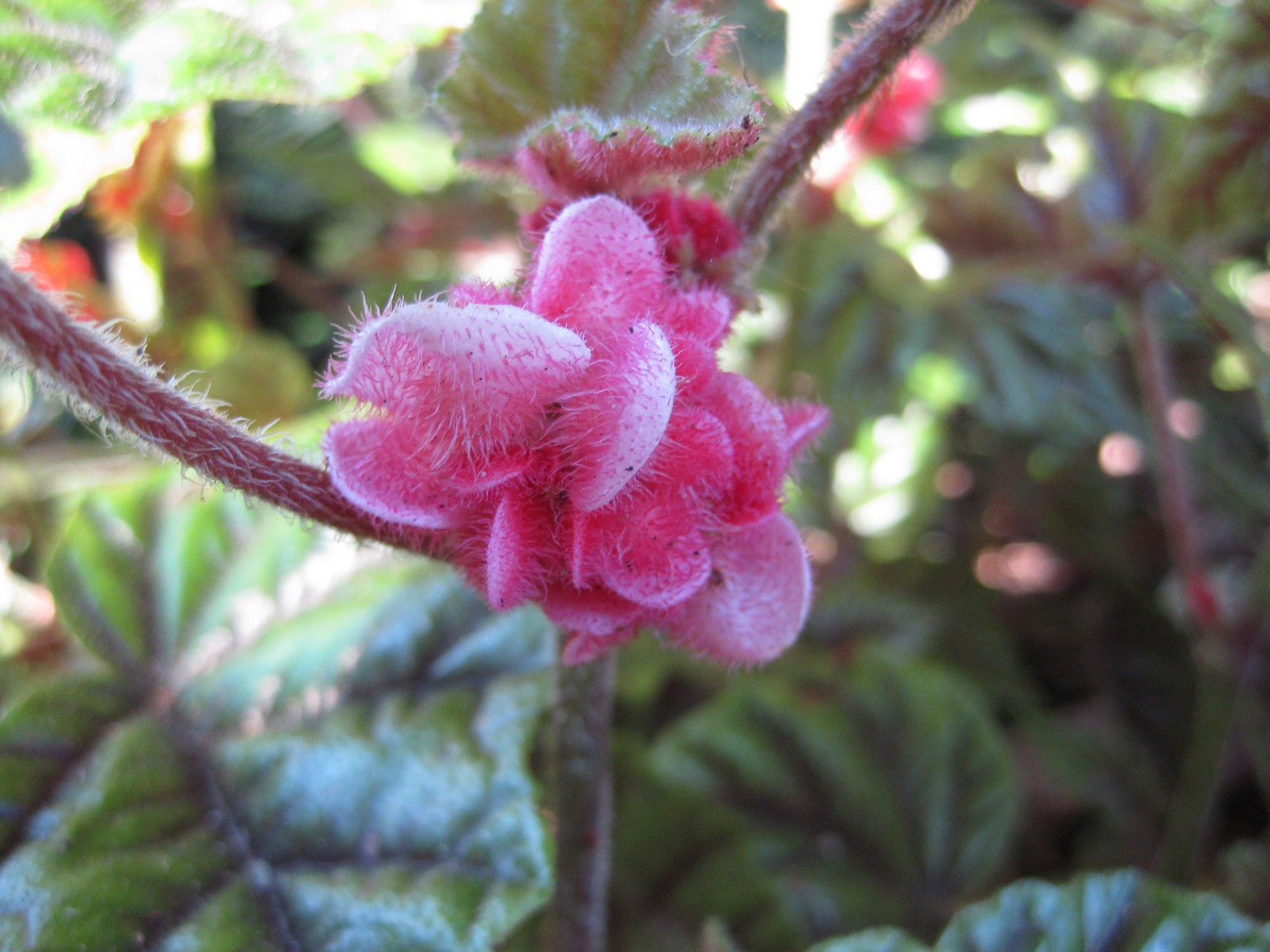

Scientific classification
- Kingdom: Plantae
- Clade: Tracheophytes
- Clade: Angiosperms
- Clade: Eudicots
- Clade: Rosids
- Order: Cucurbitales
- Family: Begoniaceae
- Genus: Begonia
- Species: B. incarnata

Binomial name
- Begonia incarnata Link & Otto

Synonyms
- List: Begonia aucubifolia Klotzsch; Begonia ciliata Steud.; Begonia incarnata var. gracilis Maund; Begonia incarnata var. papillosa A.DC.; Begonia insignis Graham; Begonia martiana Schltdl.; Begonia metallica W.G.Sm.; Begonia papillosa Graham; Begonia subpeltata Regel; Knesebeckia aucubifolia Klotzsch; Knesebeckia incarnata (Link & Otto) Klotzsch; Knesebeckia papillosa (Graham) Klotzsch

= Begonia incarnata =

Species of flowering plant

Begonia incarnata is a species of plant in the family Begoniaceae, native to Brazil. It is a shrublike evergreen perennial growing to 1 metre (39 in), bearing large, asymmetrical green leaves with a metallic sheen, and dark green veins. It produces small hairy pink flowers. As it does not tolerate temperatures below 10 °C (50 °F), in temperate regions it must be grown under glass.

This plant has gained the Royal Horticultural Society's Award of Garden Merit under the synonym Begonia metallica.
