= American Begonia Society =

Horticultural society

The American Begonia Society is a horticultural society devoted to the promotion, cultivation, and study of begonias (plant family Begoniaceae). The organization was founded in 1932, and has a worldwide membership. It is the International Cultivar Registration Authority for begonias.

The organization publishes a bi-monthly magazine, The Begonian.

== Mission ==
The stated aims and purposes of the ABS are:

- To stimulate and promote interest in begonias and other shade-loving plants.
- To encourage the introduction and development of new types of these plants.
- To standardize the nomenclature of begonias.
- To gather and publish information in regard to kinds, propagation, and culture of begonias and companion plants
- To issue a bulletin that will be mailed to all members of the society.
- To bring into friendly contact all who love and grow begonias.
