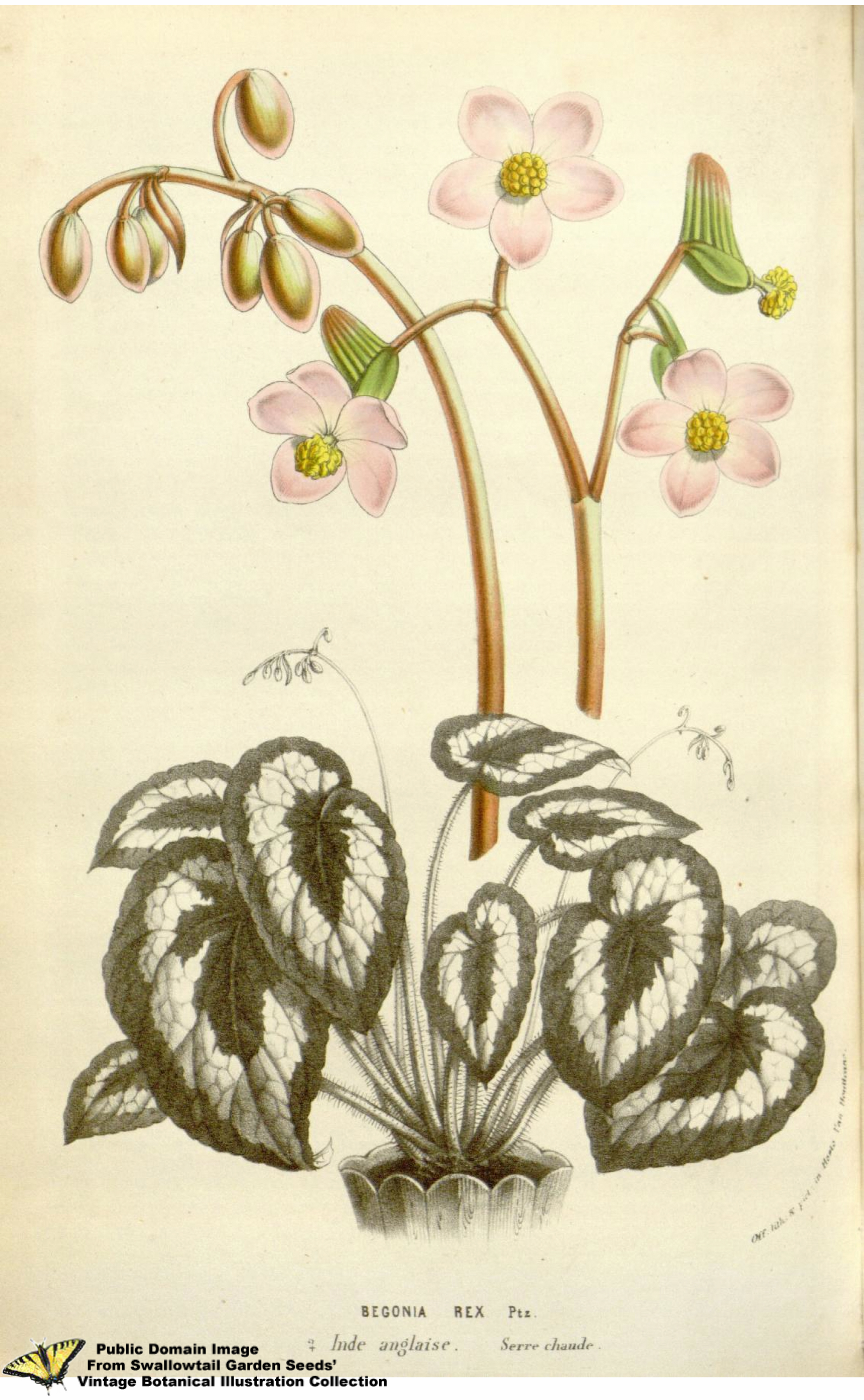
- B. rex 'Putz' cultivar drawn by G. Severeyns for Flore des serres et des jardins de l'Europe in 1857.

Scientific classification
- Kingdom: Plantae
- Clade: Tracheophytes
- Clade: Angiosperms
- Clade: Eudicots
- Clade: Rosids
- Order: Cucurbitales
- Family: Begoniaceae
- Genus: Begonia
- Species: B. rex

Binomial name
- Begonia rex Putz.

Synonyms
- Platycentrum rex (Putz.) Seem. 1860; Begonia dominiana Veitch ex J.Dix 1859; Begonia marginata T.Moore 1860; Begonia picturata Hend. ex Bosse 1861; Begonia rex var. grandis E.J.Lowe & W.Howard 1859; Begonia rex var. leopardina T.Moore 1860; Begonia rex var. nebulosa E.J.Lowe & W.Howard 1860

= Begonia rex =

Species of plant

Begonia rex, the king begonia, fancy-leaf begonia, or painted-leaf begonia is a species of flowering plant in the family Begoniaceae. It is a rhizomatous begonia first brought to England from Assam, and documented in 1857.

It is native to the East Himalayas, found from southern Bhutan to northern Myanmar, and has been introduced to Bangladesh, Cuba, the Dominican Republic, and Haiti.

These plants are noted for their dark leaves with prominent silvery grey bands, and are usually grown for their foliage, not flowers. When this species was introduced into cultivation, it became popular as a houseplant. Hybrids began to appear with varying leaf patterns as Rex begonias hybridize quite freely.

== Rex Cultorum ==
Begonia rex Putz. was thought to be good type species until molecular taxonomy revealed that it is likely only one member of a large species complex of closely related begonias with similar appearances. The complex and its hybrid progeny are collectively referred to as Begonia Rex Cultorum.

Begonia rex is in the parentage of over 500 cultivars in the Begonia Rex Cultorum Group of houseplants.

Other parents in the multitude of crosses made during the creation of the Group include Begonia annulata, B. cathayana, B. decora, B. diadema, B. dregei, B. grandis, B. hatacoa, B. palmata, and B. xanthina.

== Awards ==
Rex Cultorum Group cultivars that have gained the Royal Horticultural Society's Award of Garden Merit
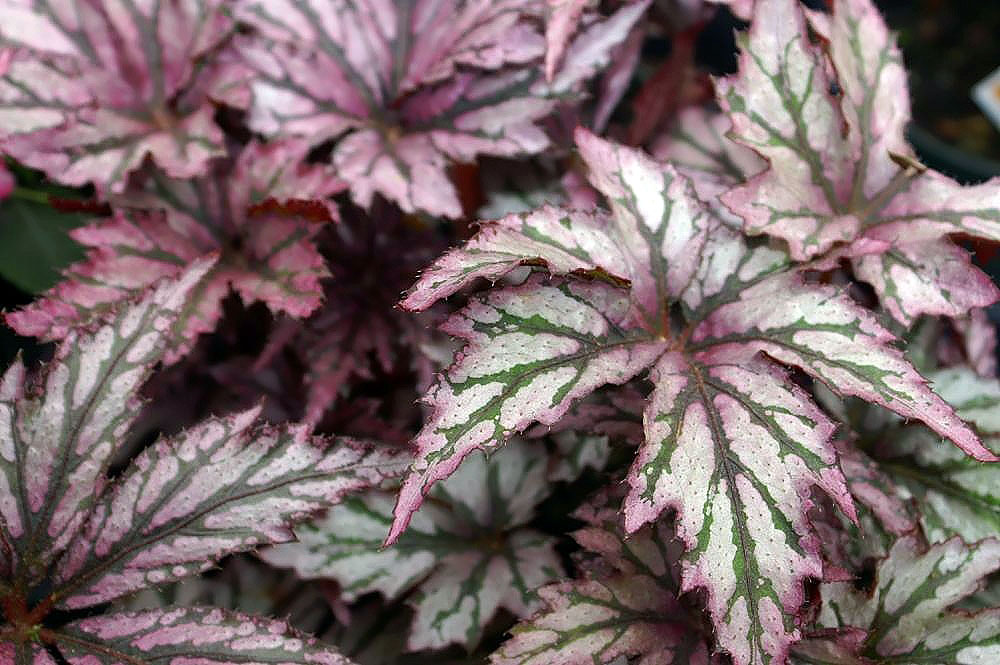
Begonia 'Benitochiba'

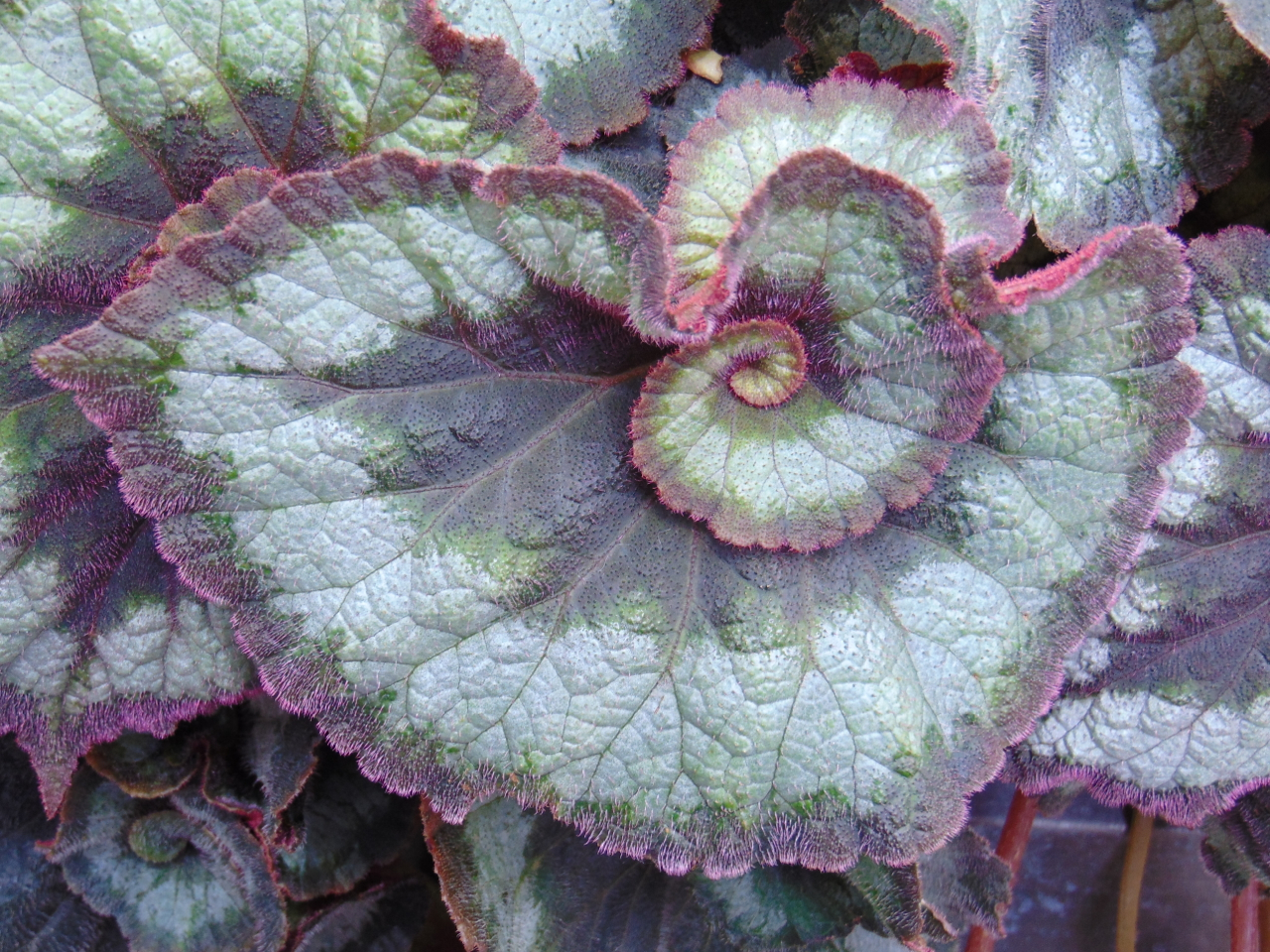
Begonia 'Escargot'

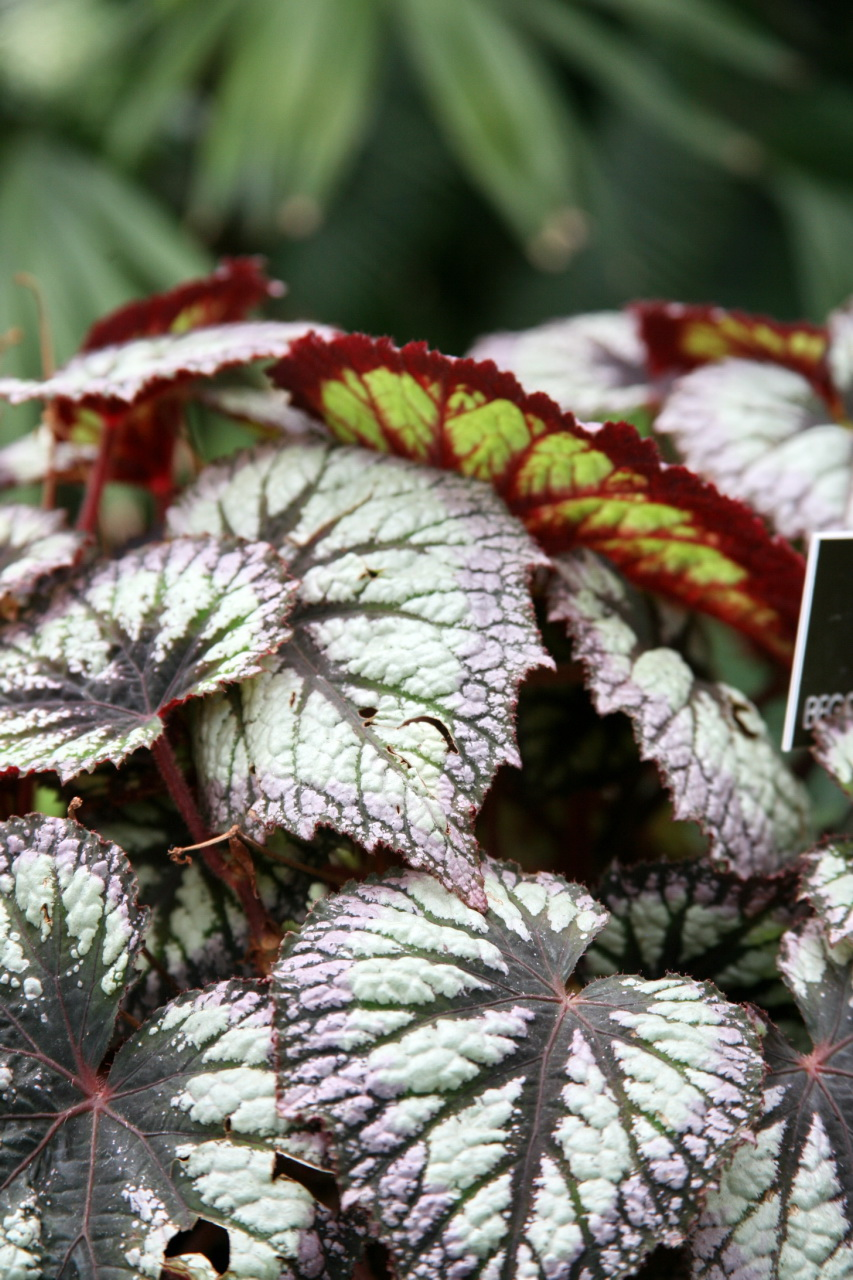
Begonia 'Fireworks'

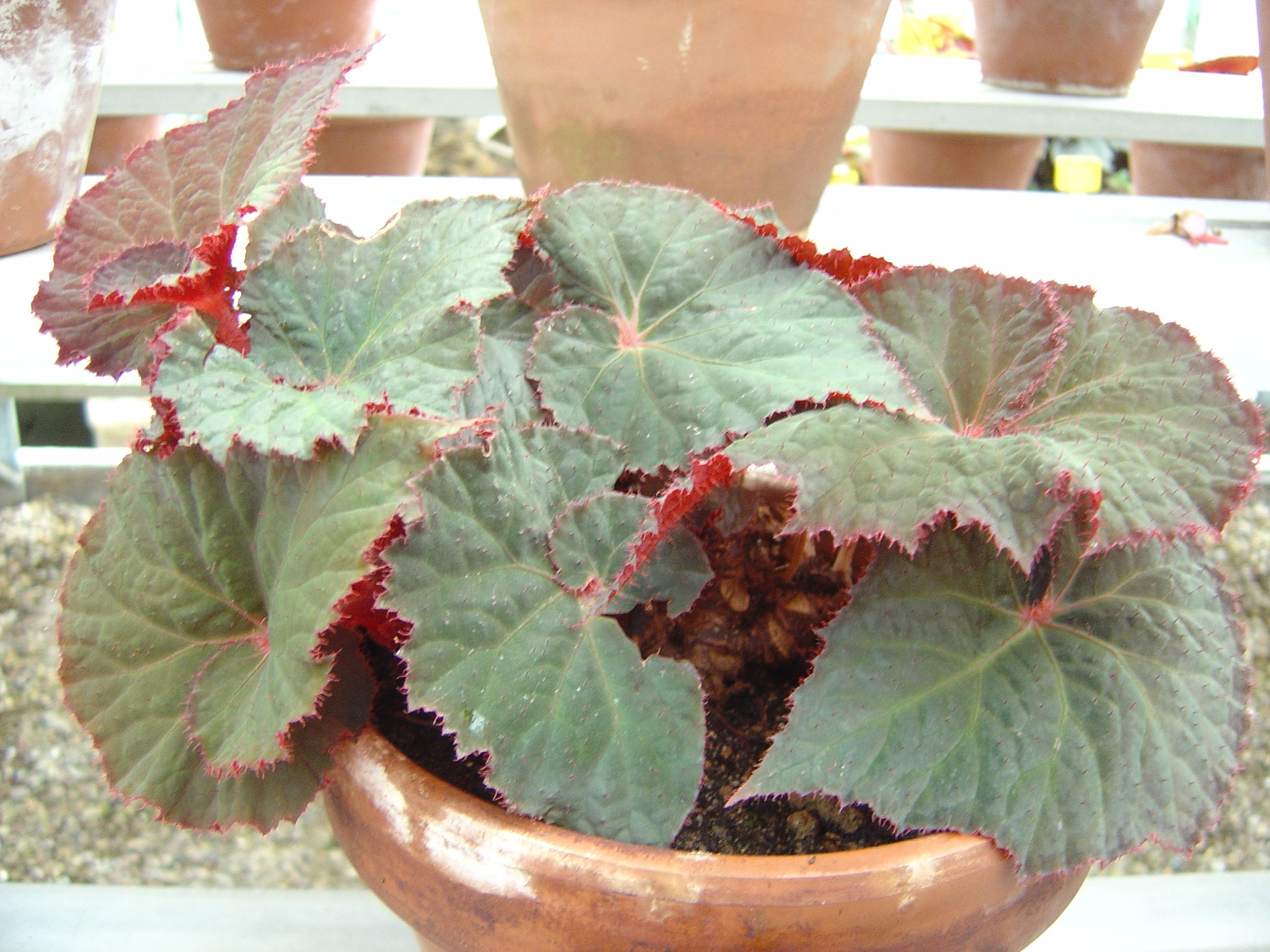
Begonia 'Midnight Magic'

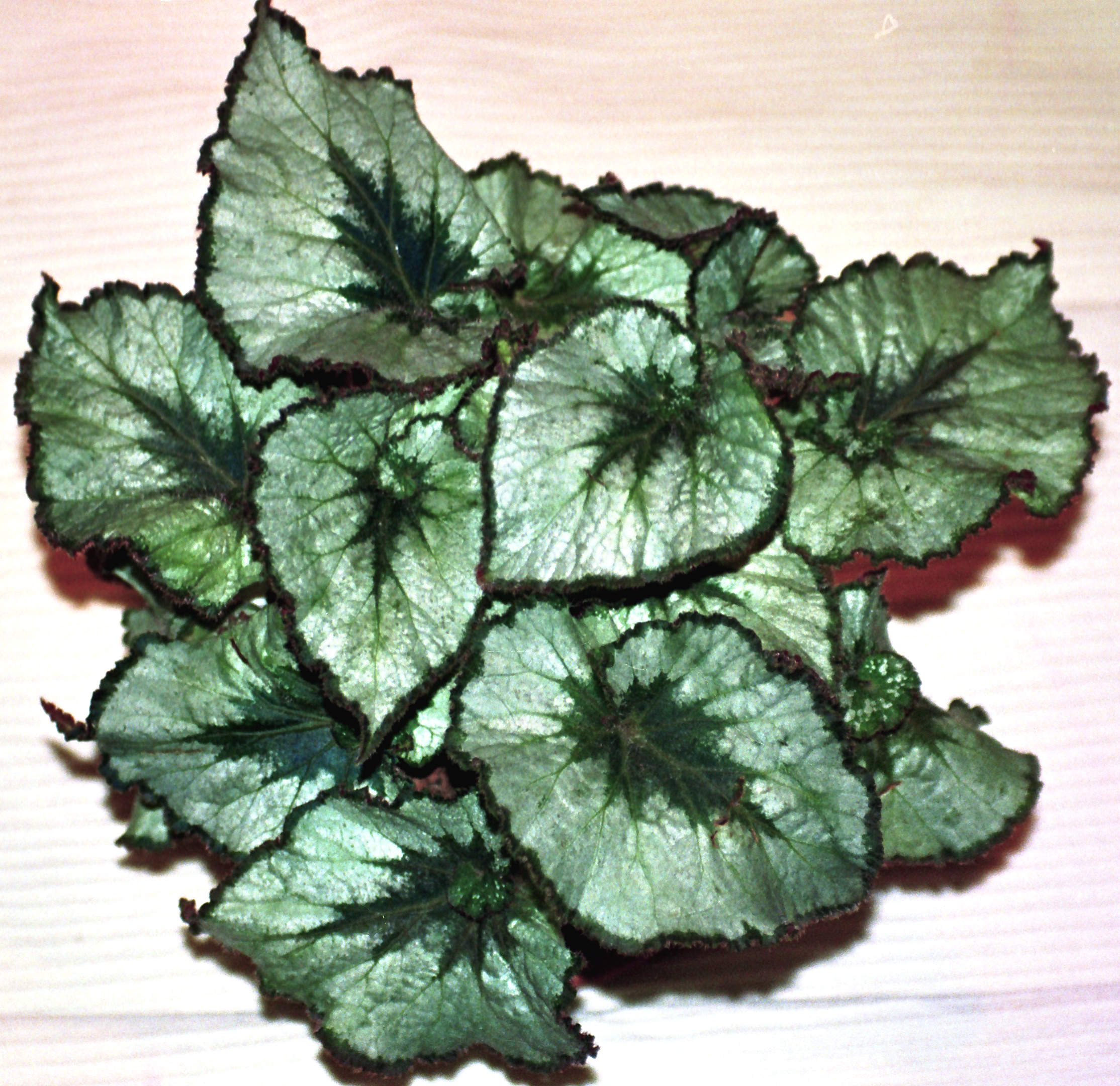
Begonia 'Namur'

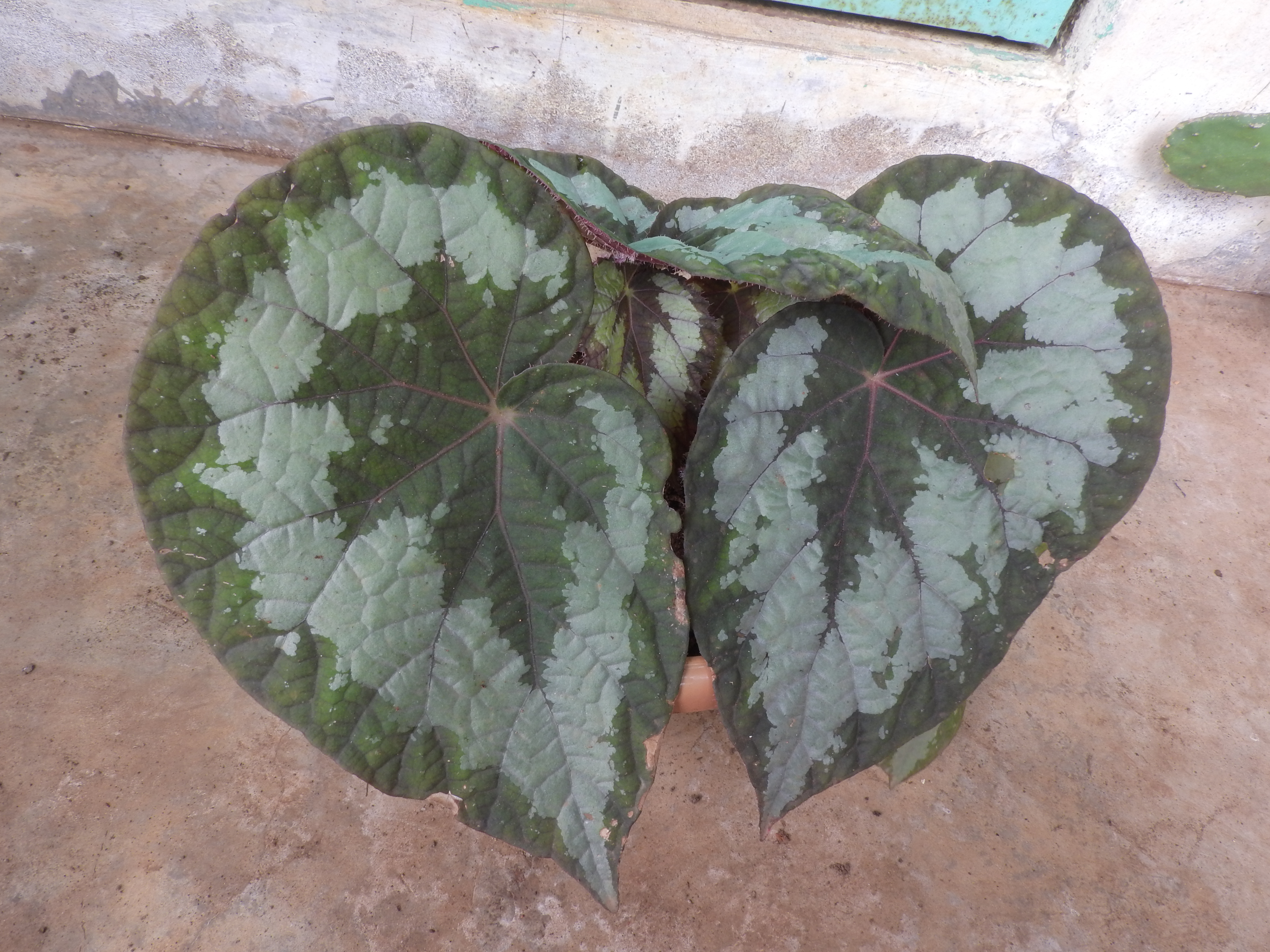
Begonia 'Silver Queen'

Other cultivars that have also received Royal Horticultural Society's Award of Garden Merit include: 'Carolina Moon', 'China Curl', 'Curly Fireflush', 'David Blais', 'Dewdrop', 'Emerald Beauty', 'Green Gold', 'Helen Lewis', 'Hilo Holiday', 'Ironstone', 'Martin Johnson', 'Mikado', 'Orient', 'Pink Champagne', 'Princess of Hanover', 'Red Robin', 'Regal Minuet', 'Rocheart', 'Roi de Roses', 'Sal's Comet', 'Sea Serpent', 'Silver Cloud', and 'Silver King'.

== Light ==
Rex begonias do well in bright, indirect light. Foliage of these plants could burn when plants are exposed to excessive direct sunlight. The ideal light intensity for most Rex begonia varieties is 1,500 to 2,200 foot-candles.

In indoor cultivation, Begonia rex benefits from consistently moist but well-drained growing media and moderate to high humidity. Watering should be adjusted to the rate at which the substrate dries rather than following a fixed schedule, as prolonged waterlogging can damage the roots and rhizome. Leaf loss or browning may also result from low humidity, excessive direct sunlight, cold drafts, or sudden changes in growing conditions. Good air circulation and bright, indirect light help maintain healthy foliage.
