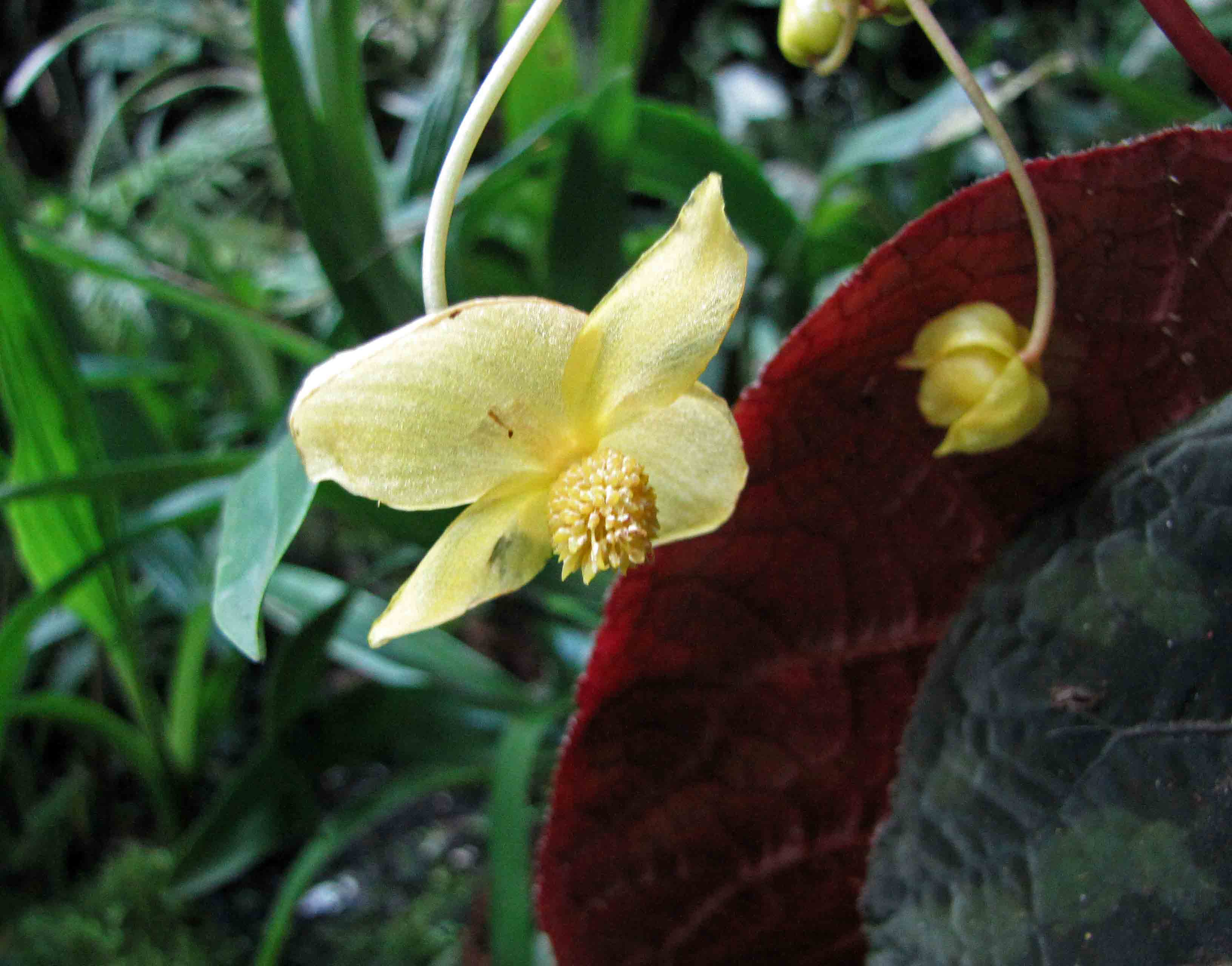
- Close-up of flower
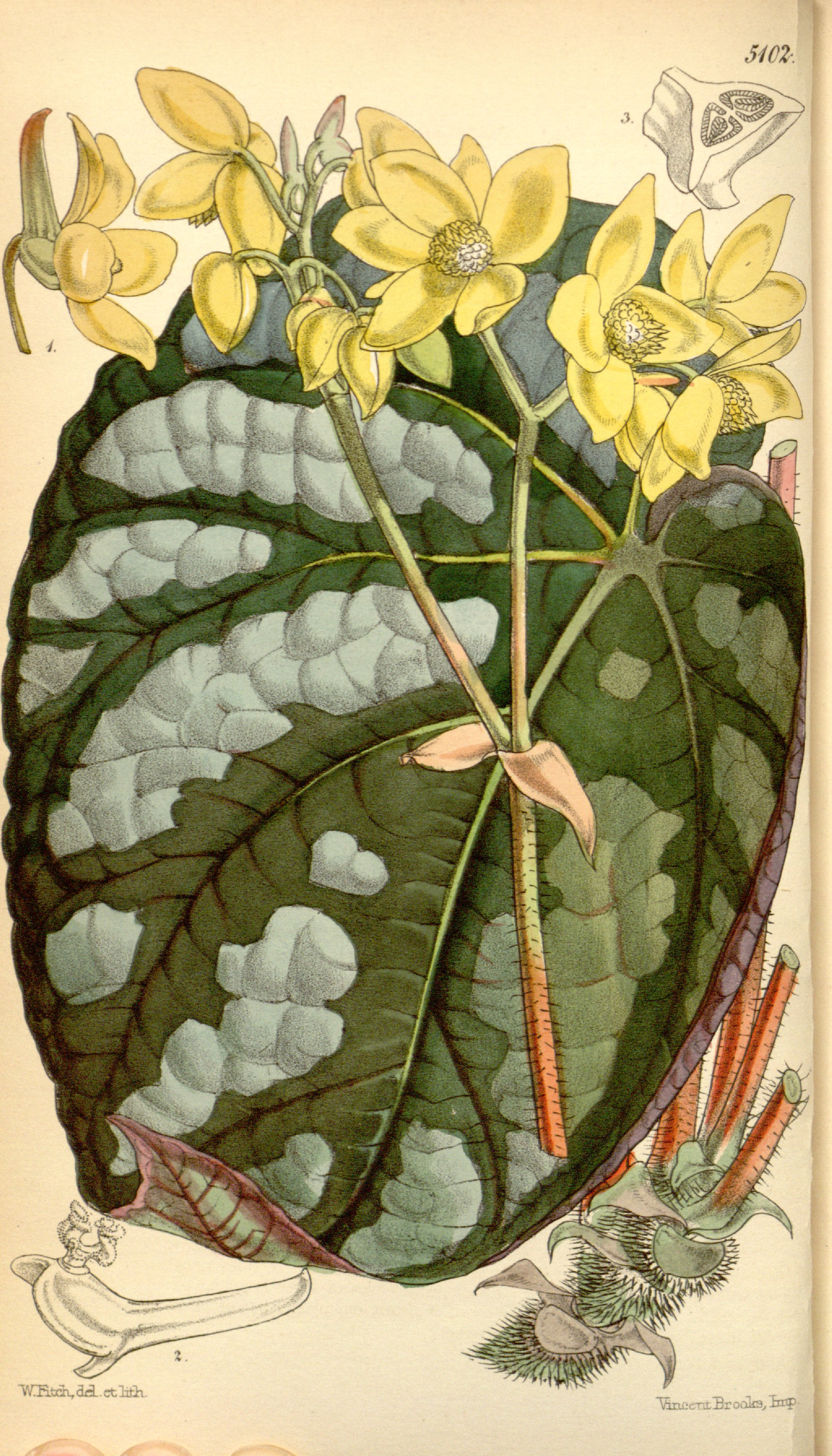
- Botanical illustration

Scientific classification
- Kingdom: Plantae
- Clade: Tracheophytes
- Clade: Angiosperms
- Clade: Eudicots
- Clade: Rosids
- Order: Cucurbitales
- Family: Begoniaceae
- Genus: Begonia
- Species: B. xanthina

Binomial name
- Begonia xanthina Hook.

Synonyms
- List: Begonia lazulii Linden; Begonia marmorata Van Houtte ex Planch.; Begonia poecila K.Koch; Begonia xanthina argentea T.Moore; Begonia xanthina var. lazuli Hook.; Begonia xanthina marmorata T.Moore; Begonia xanthina var. pictifolia Hook.; Begonia xanthina var. reichenheimii T.Moore

= Begonia xanthina =

Species of plant

Begonia xanthina is a species of flowering plant in the family Begoniaceae, native to the eastern Himalayas, Assam, and southwestern Yunnan in China. A rhizomatous geophyte reaching 40 cm (16 in), it is typically found growing near streams on rocky forested hills up to 800 m (2,600 ft) in elevation. It resembles Begonia rex, but with yellow flowers and scattered light green splotches on the leaves.
