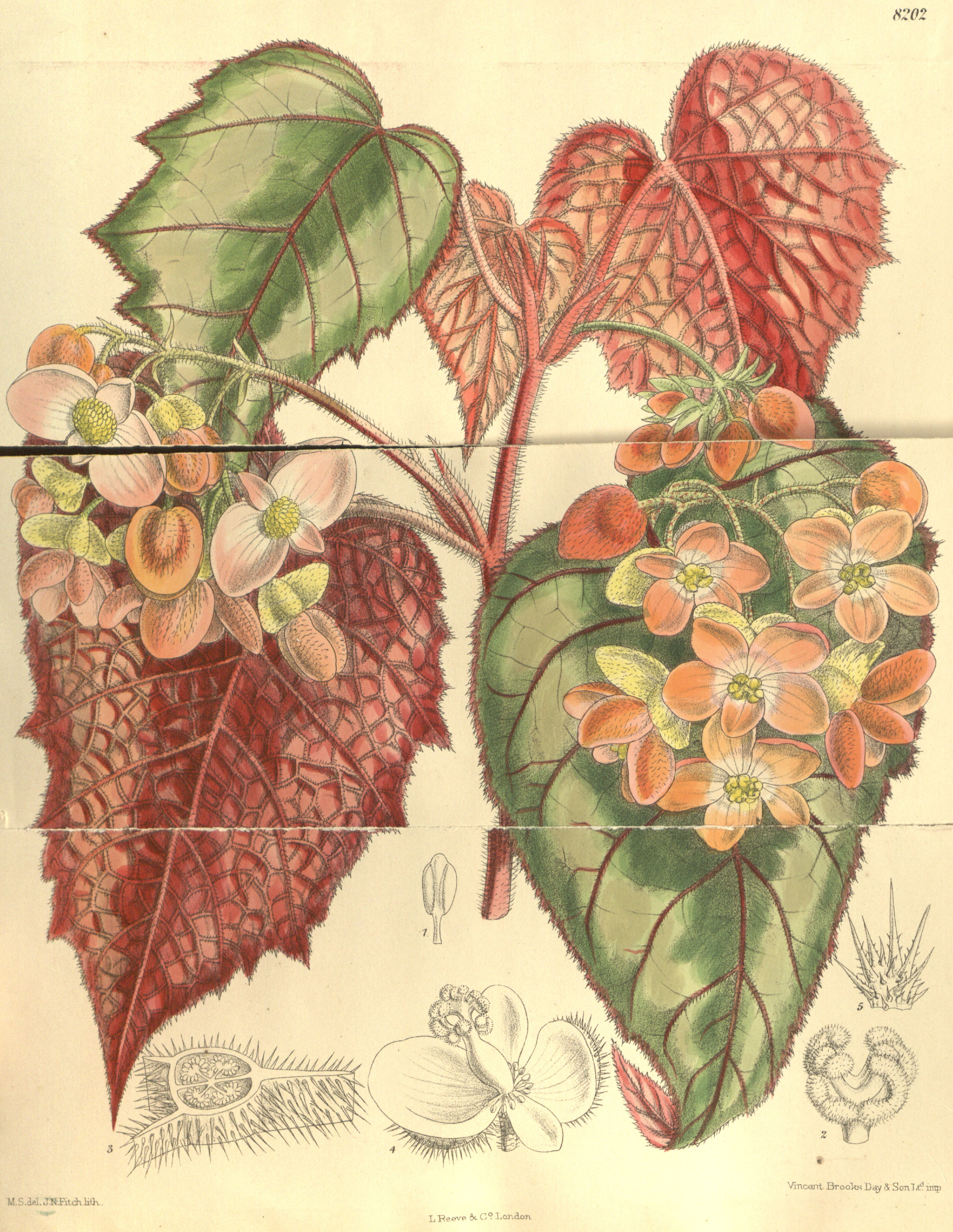
- Botanical illustration

Scientific classification
- Kingdom: Plantae
- Clade: Embryophytes
- Clade: Tracheophytes
- Clade: Angiosperms
- Clade: Eudicots
- Clade: Rosids
- Order: Cucurbitales
- Family: Begoniaceae
- Genus: Begonia
- Species: B. cathayana

Binomial name
- Begonia cathayana Hemsl.

= Begonia cathayana =

Species of plant

Begonia cathayana is a species of flowering plant in the family Begoniaceae. It is native to southeastern Yunnan and southern Guangxi, China, and to northern Vietnam. An erect herb reaching 60 cm (24 in), it is typically found in shady scrublands and woodlands at elevations from 800 to 1,500 m (2,600 to 4,900 ft).
