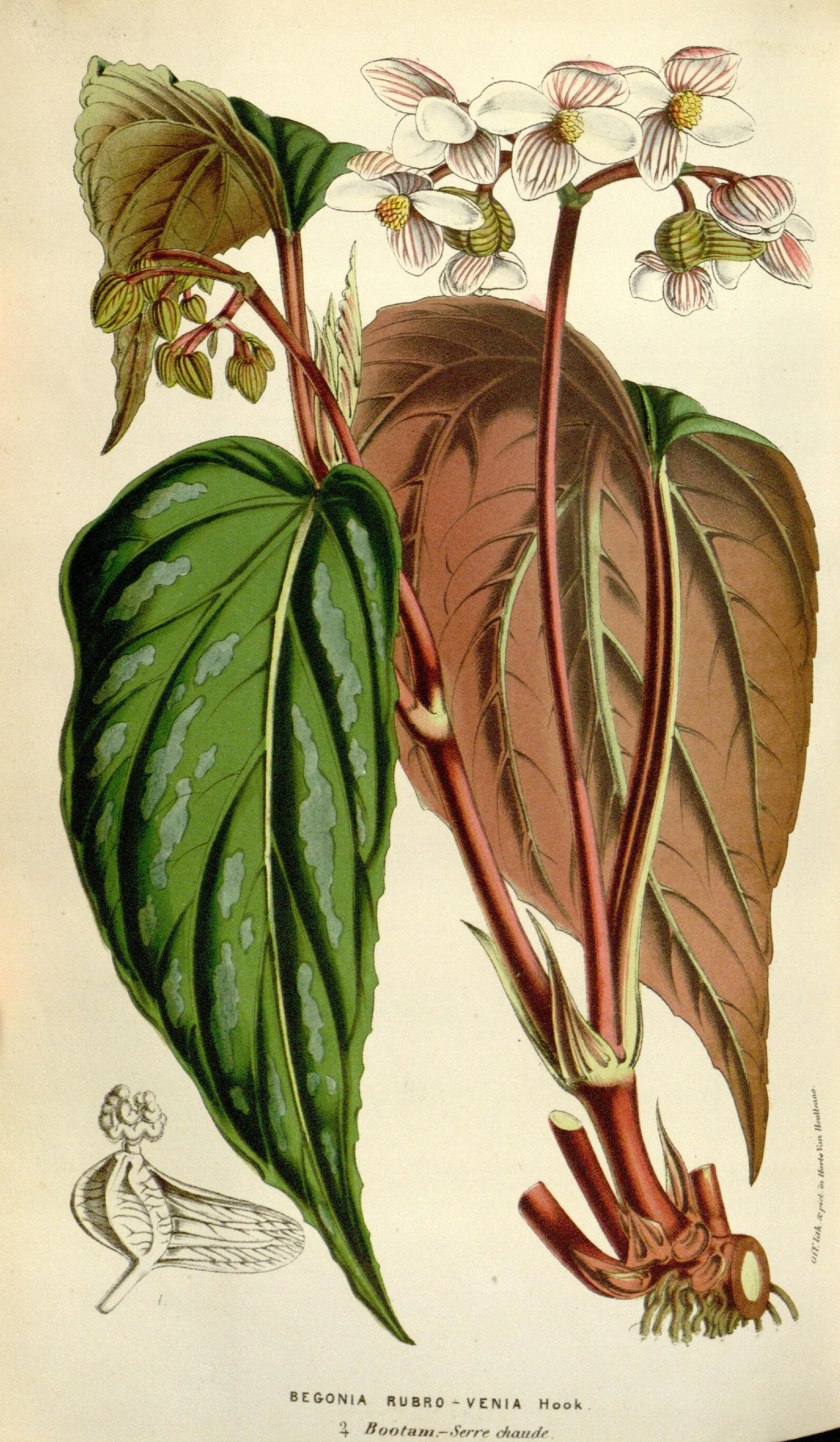
- Botanical illustration

Scientific classification
- Kingdom: Plantae
- Clade: Tracheophytes
- Clade: Angiosperms
- Clade: Eudicots
- Clade: Rosids
- Order: Cucurbitales
- Family: Begoniaceae
- Genus: Begonia
- Species: B. hatacoa

Binomial name
- Begonia hatacoa Buch.-Ham. ex D.Don

Synonyms
- List: Begonia hatacoa var. rubrifolia Golding & Rekha Morris; Begonia hatacoa var. viridifolia Golding & Rekha Morris; Begonia meisneri Wall.; Begonia rubrovenia Hook.; Begonia rubrovenia var. meisneri Wall. ex C.B.Clarke; Platycentrum rubrovenium (Hook.) Klotzsch

= Begonia hatacoa =

Species of flowering plant

Begonia hatacoa is a species of flowering plant in the family Begoniaceae, native to Tibet, Nepal, the eastern Himalayas, Assam, Bangladesh, Myanmar, Thailand, and Vietnam. Its best-known cultivar is 'Silver'.

== Subtaxa ==
The following varieties are accepted:

- Begonia hatacoa var. hatacoa
- Begonia hatacoa var. meisneri (Wall. ex C.B.Clarke) Golding – Assam
