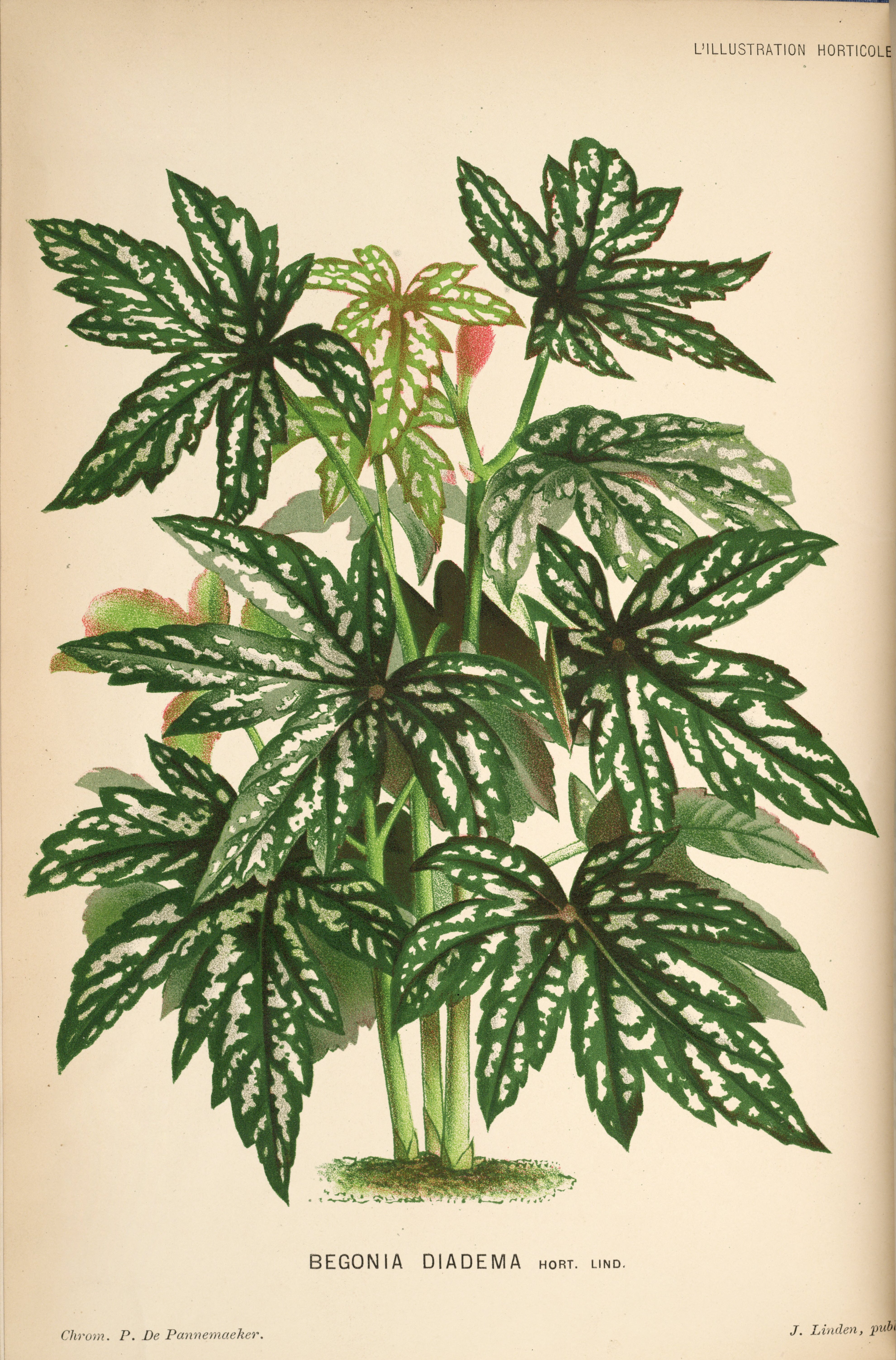
- Botanical illustration of Begonia diadema drawn by Jean Jules Linden for L'Illustration Horticole

Scientific classification
- Kingdom: Plantae
- Clade: Tracheophytes
- Clade: Angiosperms
- Clade: Eudicots
- Clade: Rosids
- Order: Cucurbitales
- Family: Begoniaceae
- Genus: Begonia
- Species: B. diadema

Binomial name
- Begonia diadema Linden

= Begonia diadema =

Species of flowering plant

Begonia diadema is a species of flowering plant in the family Begoniaceae, native to Costa Rica. It has a rhizomatous growth habit with erect stems, pink flowers, and palmate leaves. In gardens, it prefers shade and blooms in the spring. For hybridizers, B. diadema is a common parent species in the rex cultorum.

== Images ==
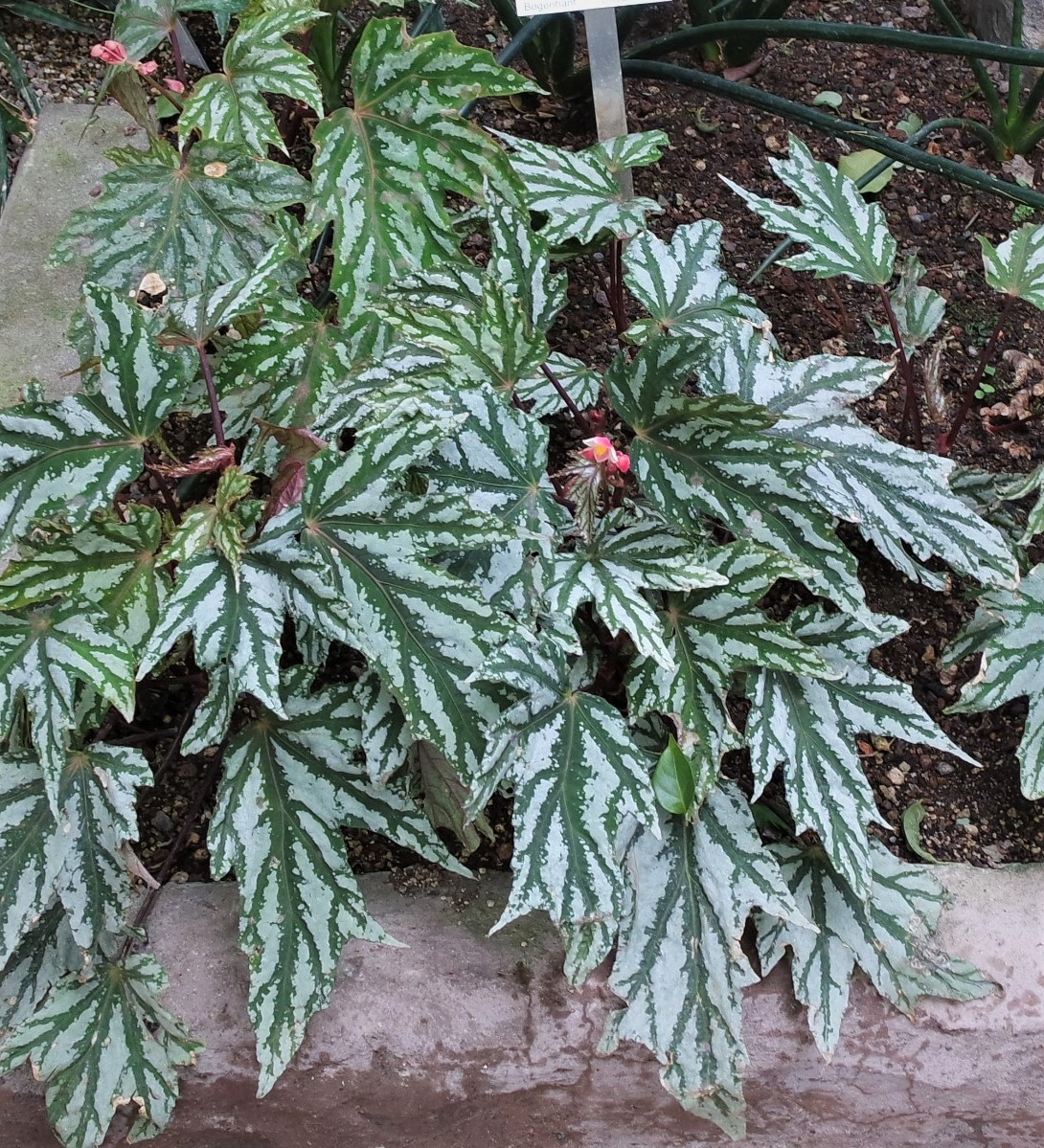

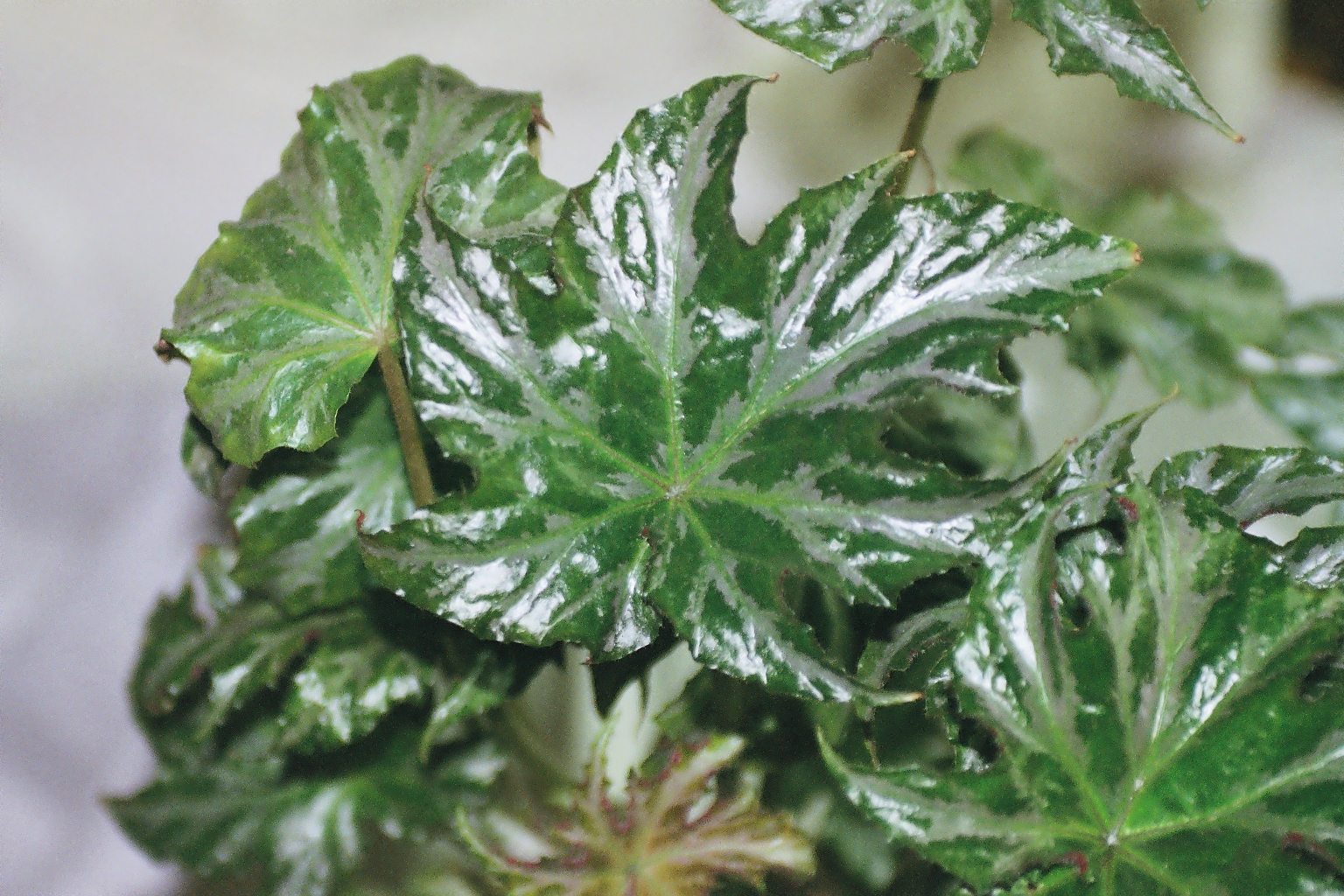
Silver Star cultivar

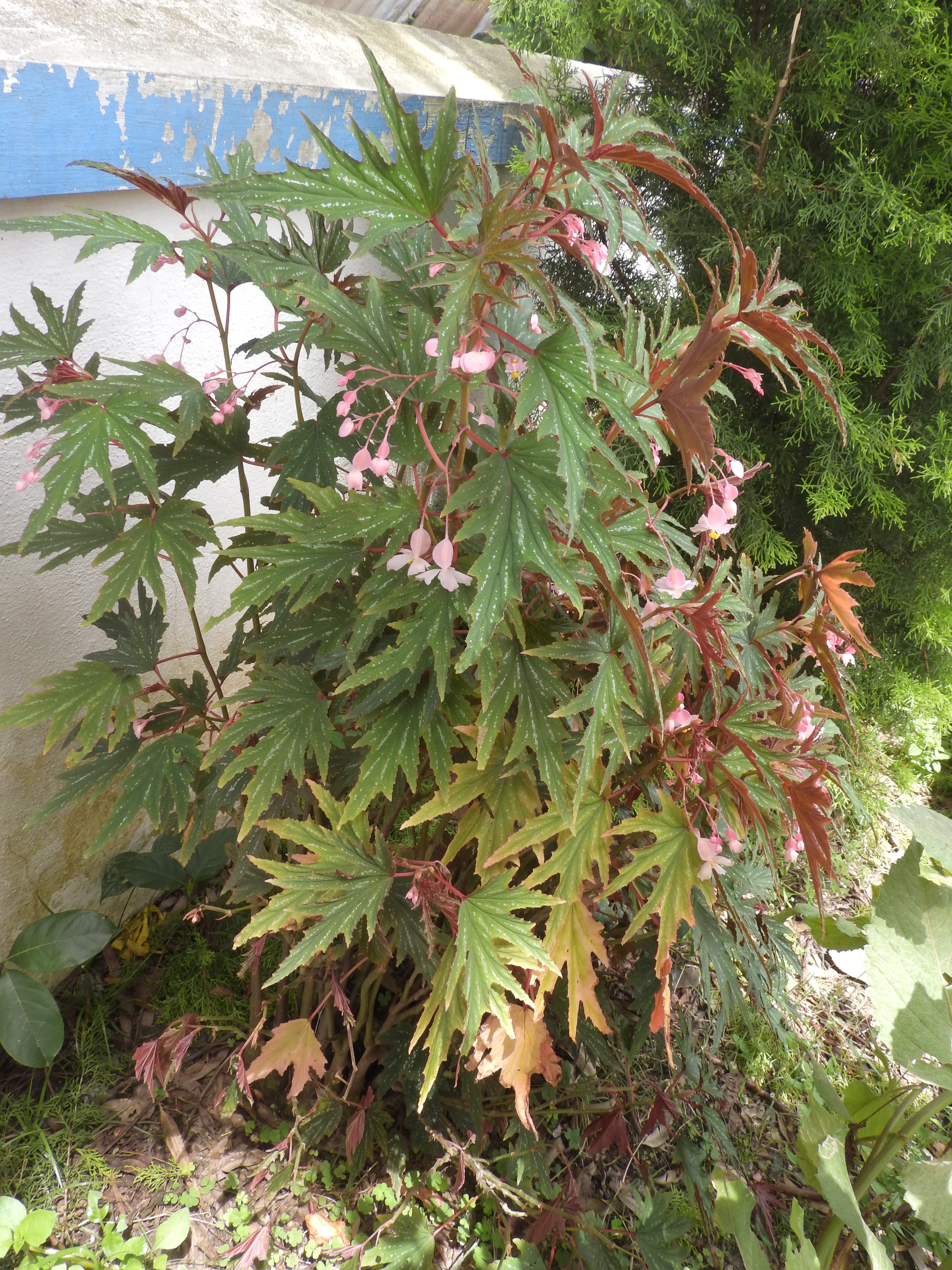

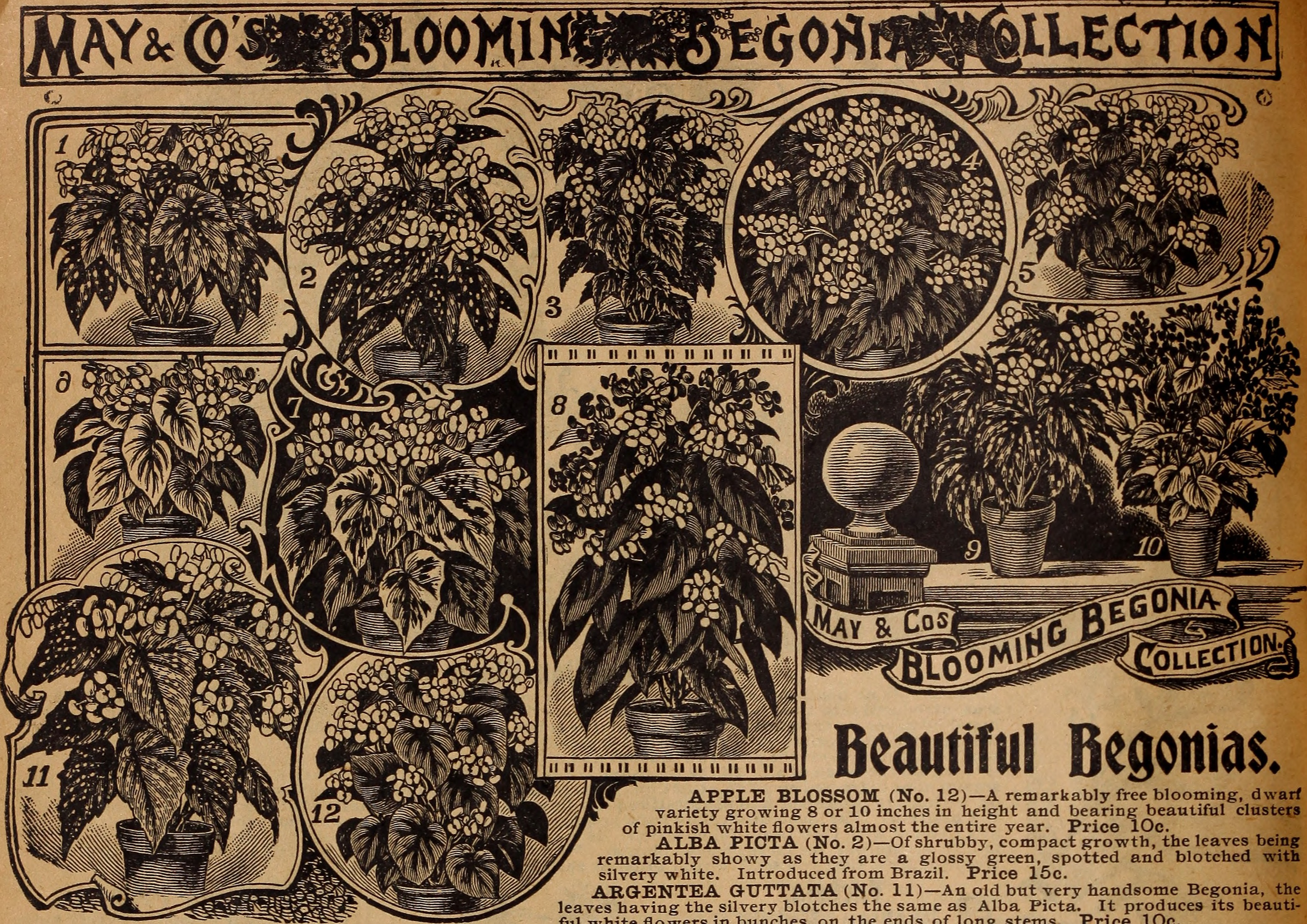
Ornamental plant catalog from 1899. B. diadema is numbered 9.
