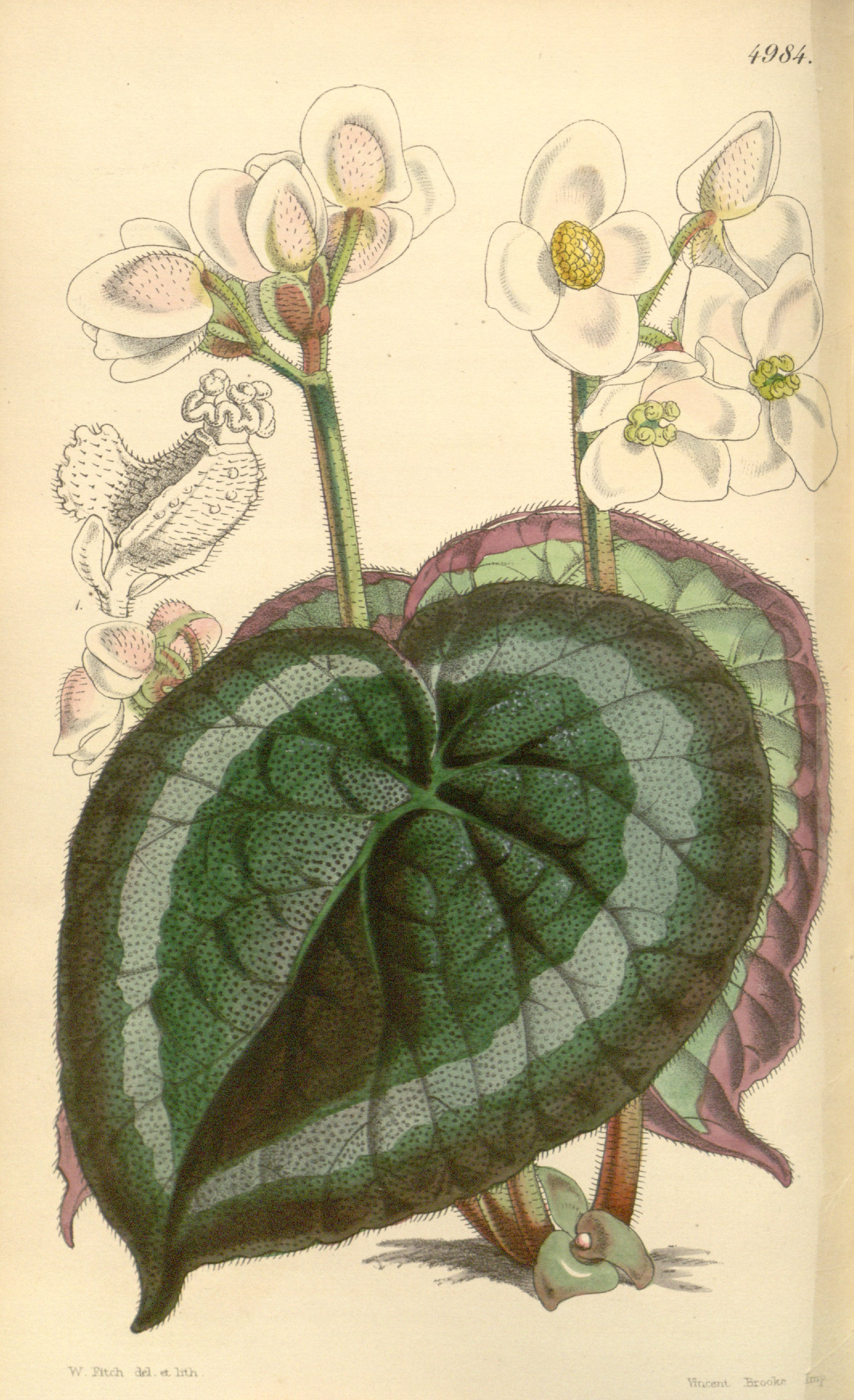
- Botanical illustration, as Begonia griffithii

Scientific classification
- Kingdom: Plantae
- Clade: Tracheophytes
- Clade: Angiosperms
- Clade: Eudicots
- Clade: Rosids
- Order: Cucurbitales
- Family: Begoniaceae
- Genus: Begonia
- Species: B. annulata

Binomial name
- Begonia annulata K.Koch

Synonyms
- Platycentrum annulatum (K.Koch) Regel; Begonia barbata Wall. ex A.DC.; Begonia griffithii Hook

= Begonia annulata =

Species of flowering plant

Begonia annulata, the ringed begonia, is a species of flowering plant in the family Begoniaceae. It is native to the eastern Himalaya, Bangladesh, Assam in India, Myanmar, and Vietnam. It has gained the Royal Horticultural Society's Award of Garden Merit.
