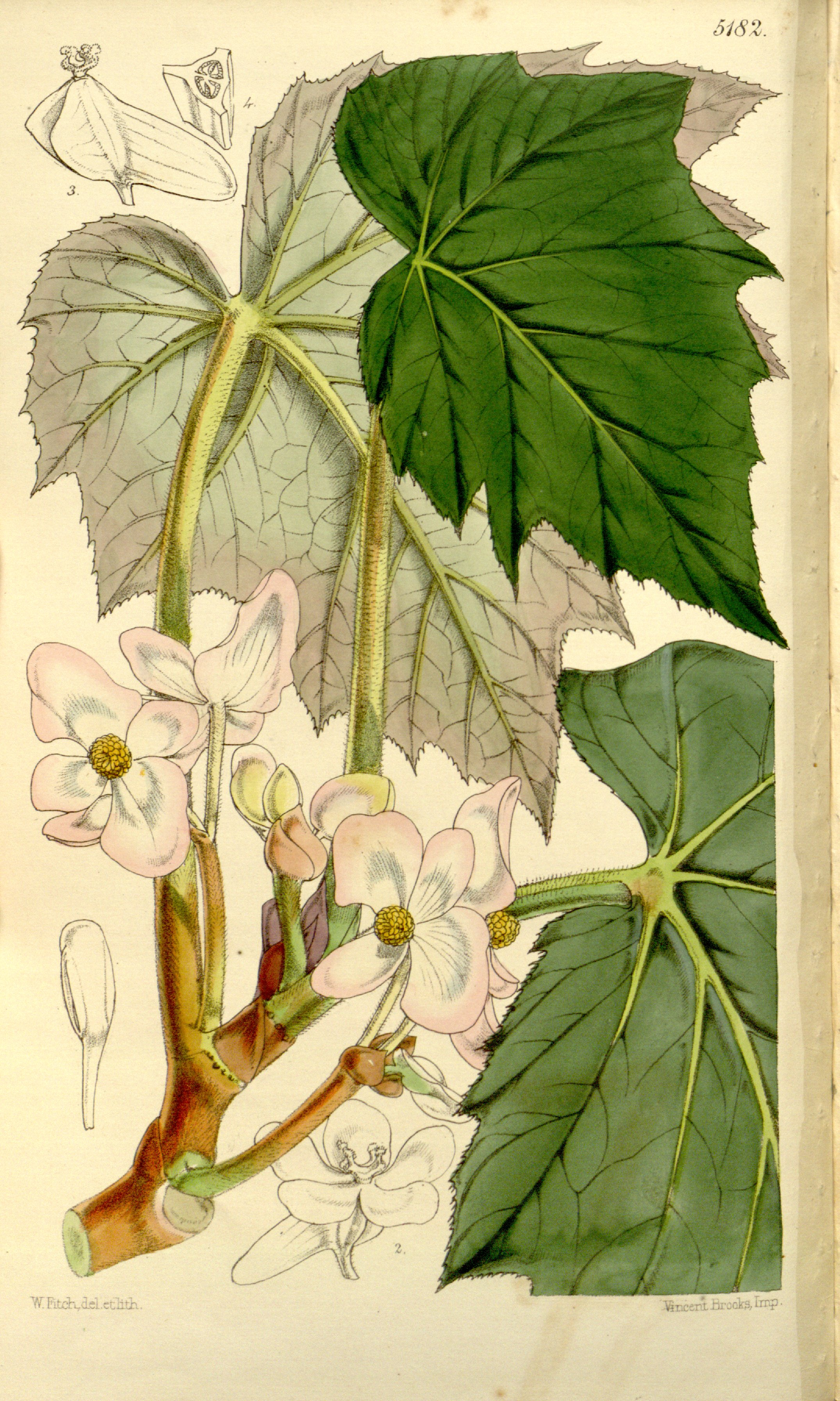

Scientific classification
- Kingdom: Plantae
- Clade: Tracheophytes
- Clade: Angiosperms
- Clade: Eudicots
- Clade: Rosids
- Order: Cucurbitales
- Family: Begoniaceae
- Genus: Begonia
- Species: B. palmata

Binomial name
- Begonia palmata D.Don

Synonyms
- List: Begonia bowringiana Champ. ex Benth.; Begonia ferruginea Hayata; Begonia kouytcheouensis Guillaumin; Begonia laciniata Roxb.; Begonia palmata var. bowringiana (Champ. ex Benth.) Golding & Kareg.; Begonia palmata var. crassisetulosaa (Irmsch.) Golding & Kareg.; Begonia palmata var. khasiana (Irmsch.) Golding & Kareg.; Begonia palmata var. laevifolia (Irmsch.) Golding & Kareg.; Begonia palmata var. principalis (Irmsch.) Golding & Kareg.; Begonia randaiensis Sasaki; Doratometra bowringiana (Champ. ex Benth.) Seem.

= Begonia palmata =

Species of plant

Begonia palmata is a species of plant in the genus Begonia of the family Begoniaceae. It is a small herb of height 20–90 cm tall. It is found in moist places, next to streams or under the shade. It is found in many parts of Asia, including eastern Himalayas.

== Description ==
Begonia palmata is an herb growing 20–90 cm tall.

== Distribution ==
Northeast India, Fujian, Guangdong etc. (check the reference for complete list) up to elevation of 100–3200 meters

== Gallery ==
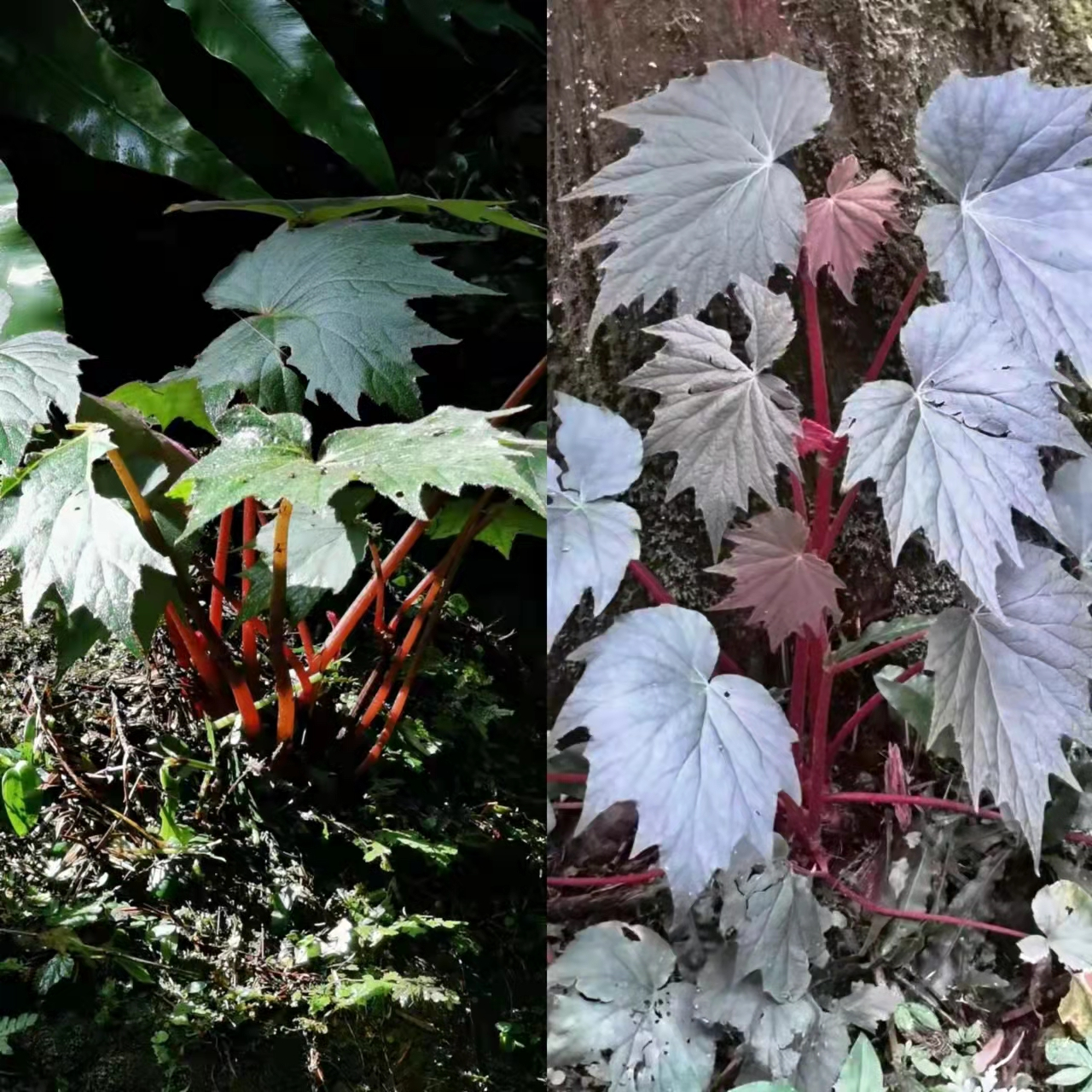
Leaves basal and cauline

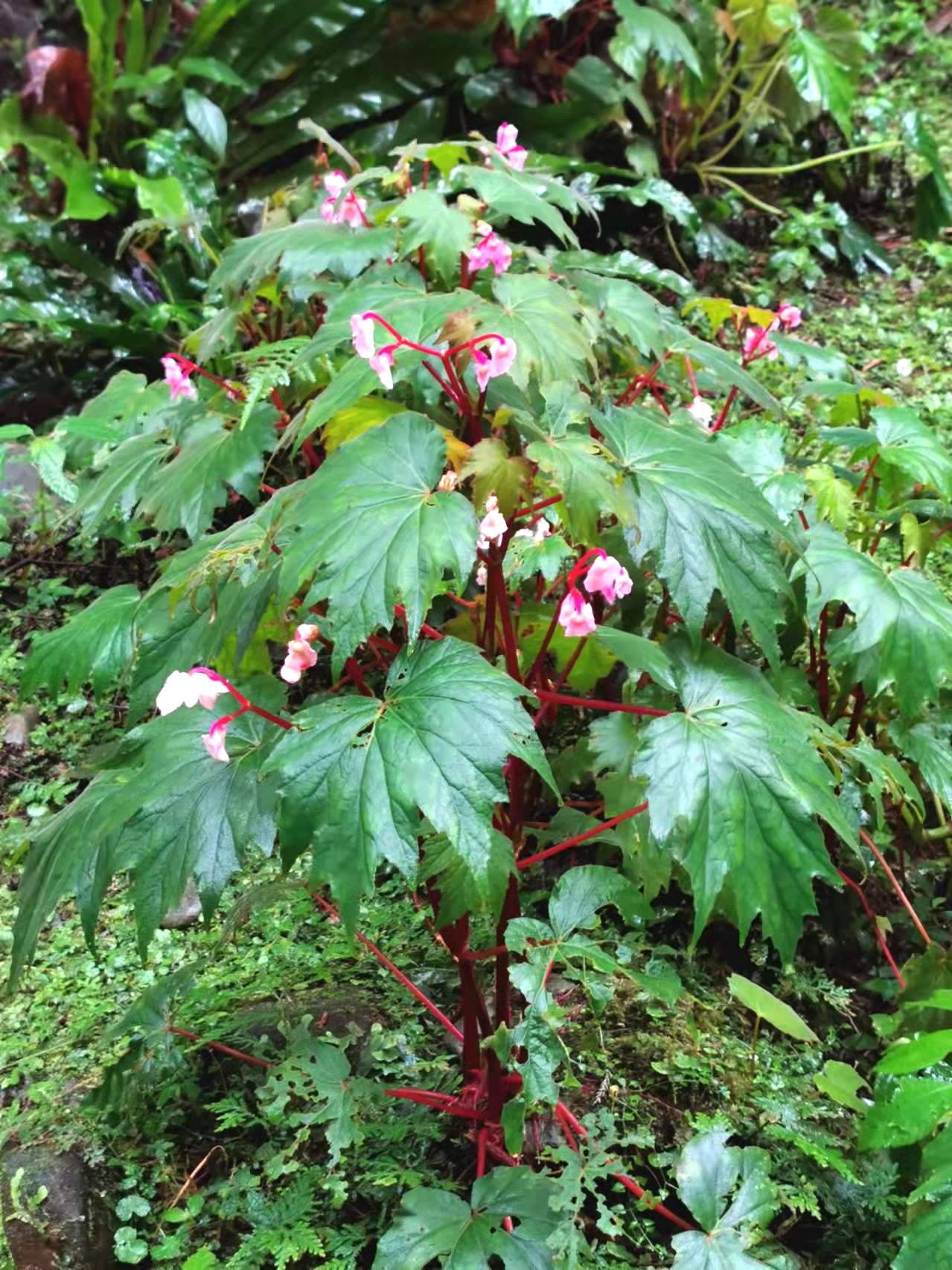
Flowers grow on erect stems (taken after rain). B. palmata is monoecious.

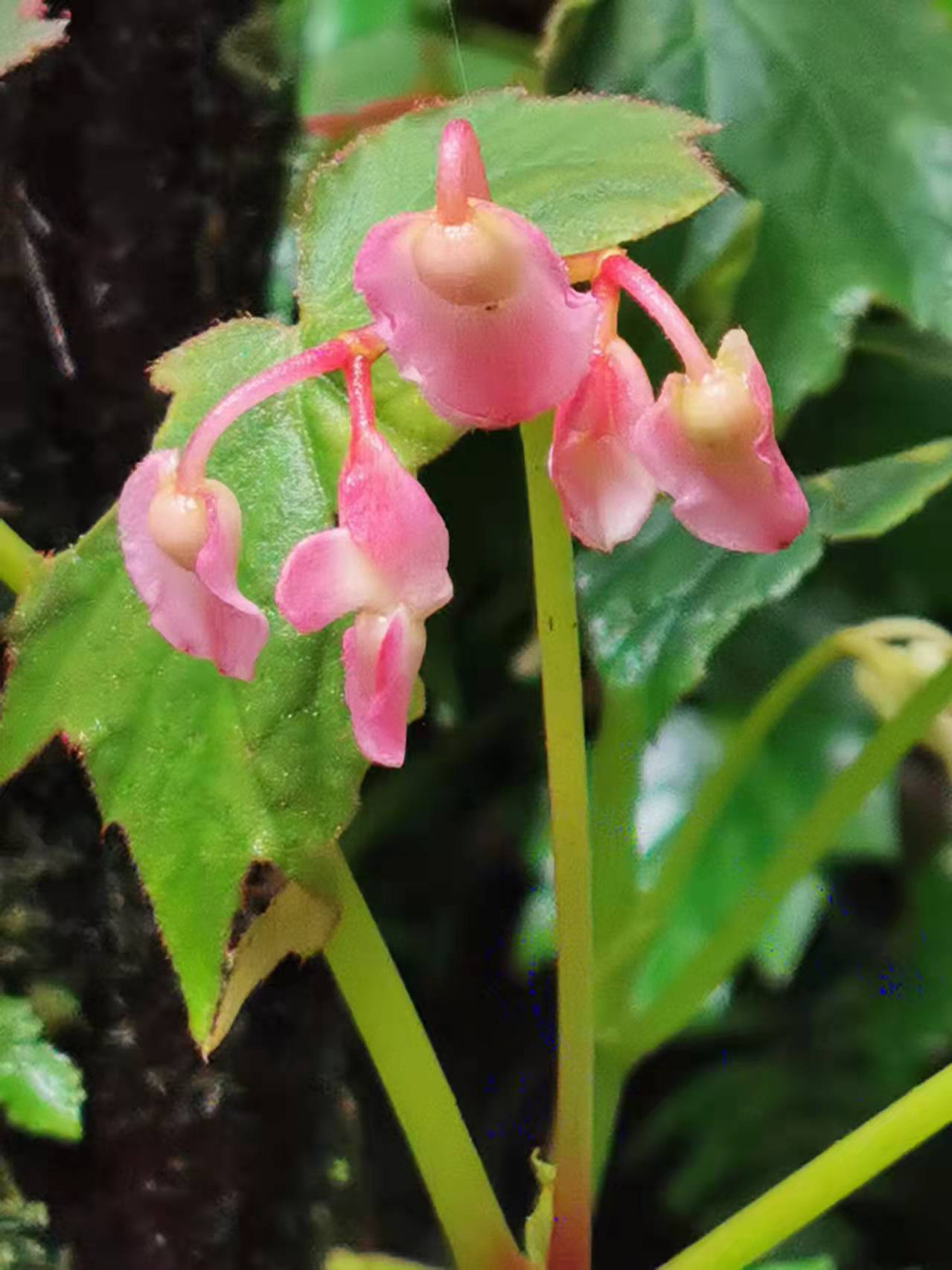
Inflorescence dichotomous. Ovary with three wings, the dorsal wings are much longer than the flanks.

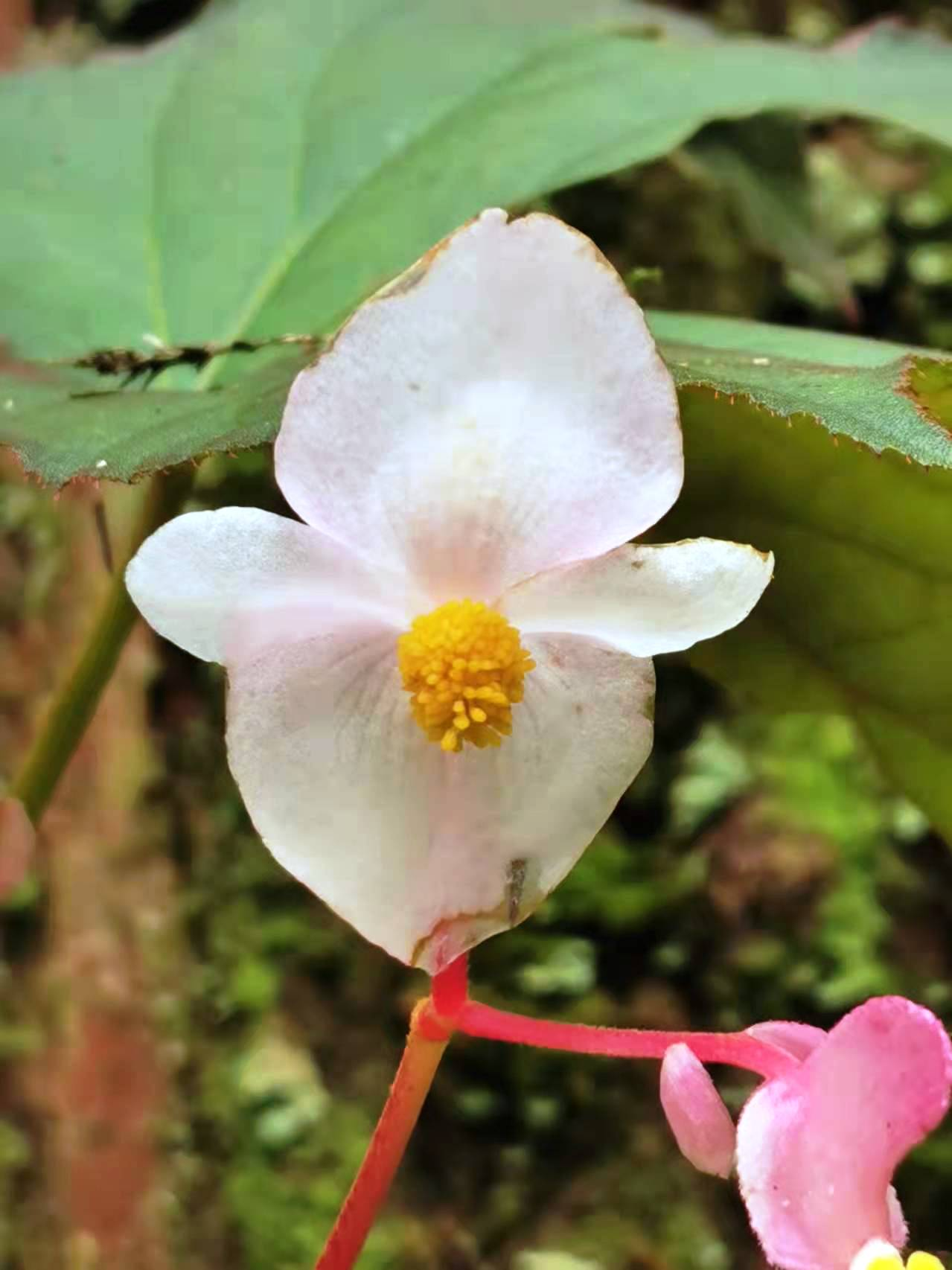
The male flower has 4 tepals, and the female flower has 5 tepals.

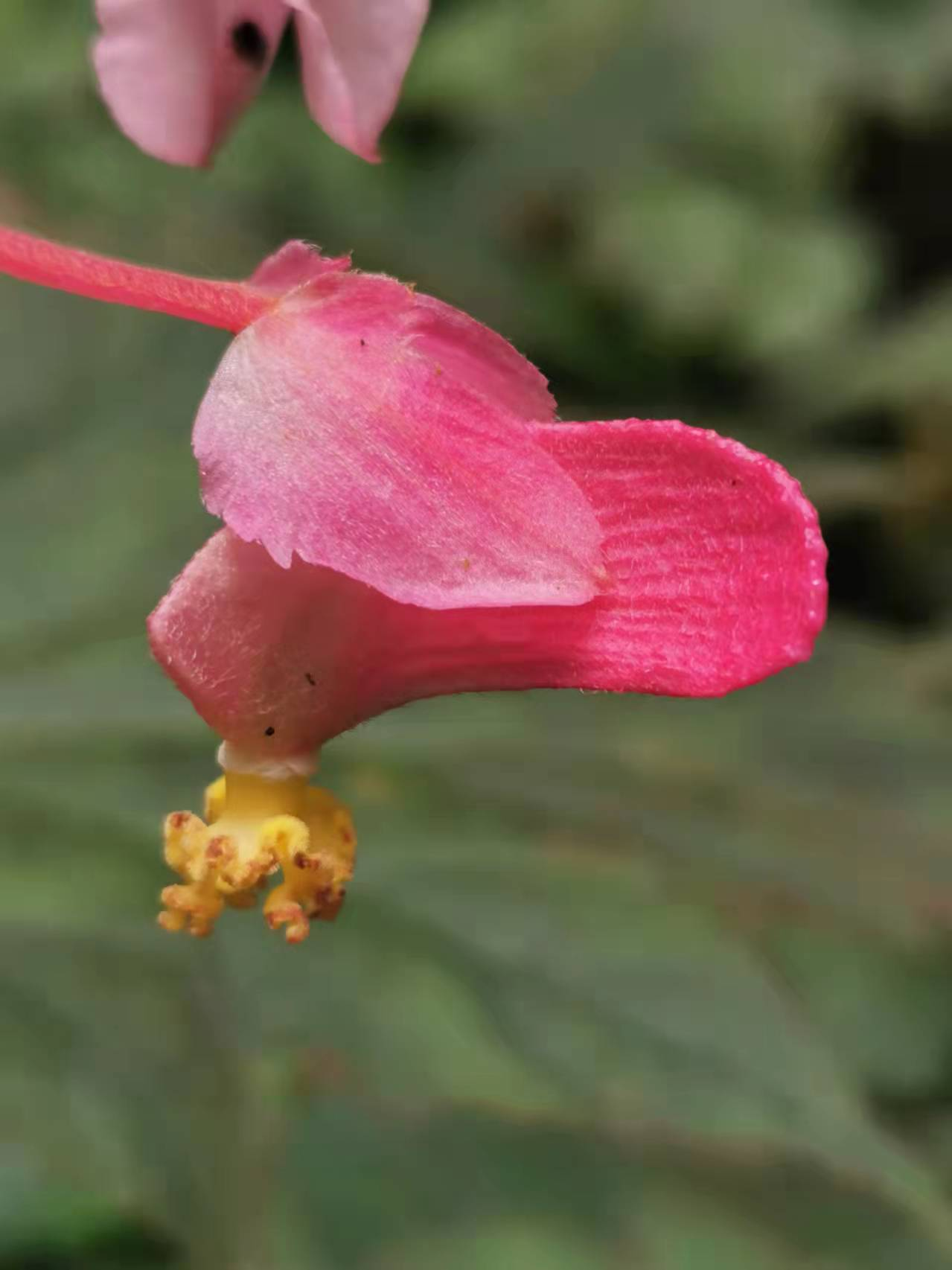
Capsules have three wings, the dorsal wings are much longer than the flanks.

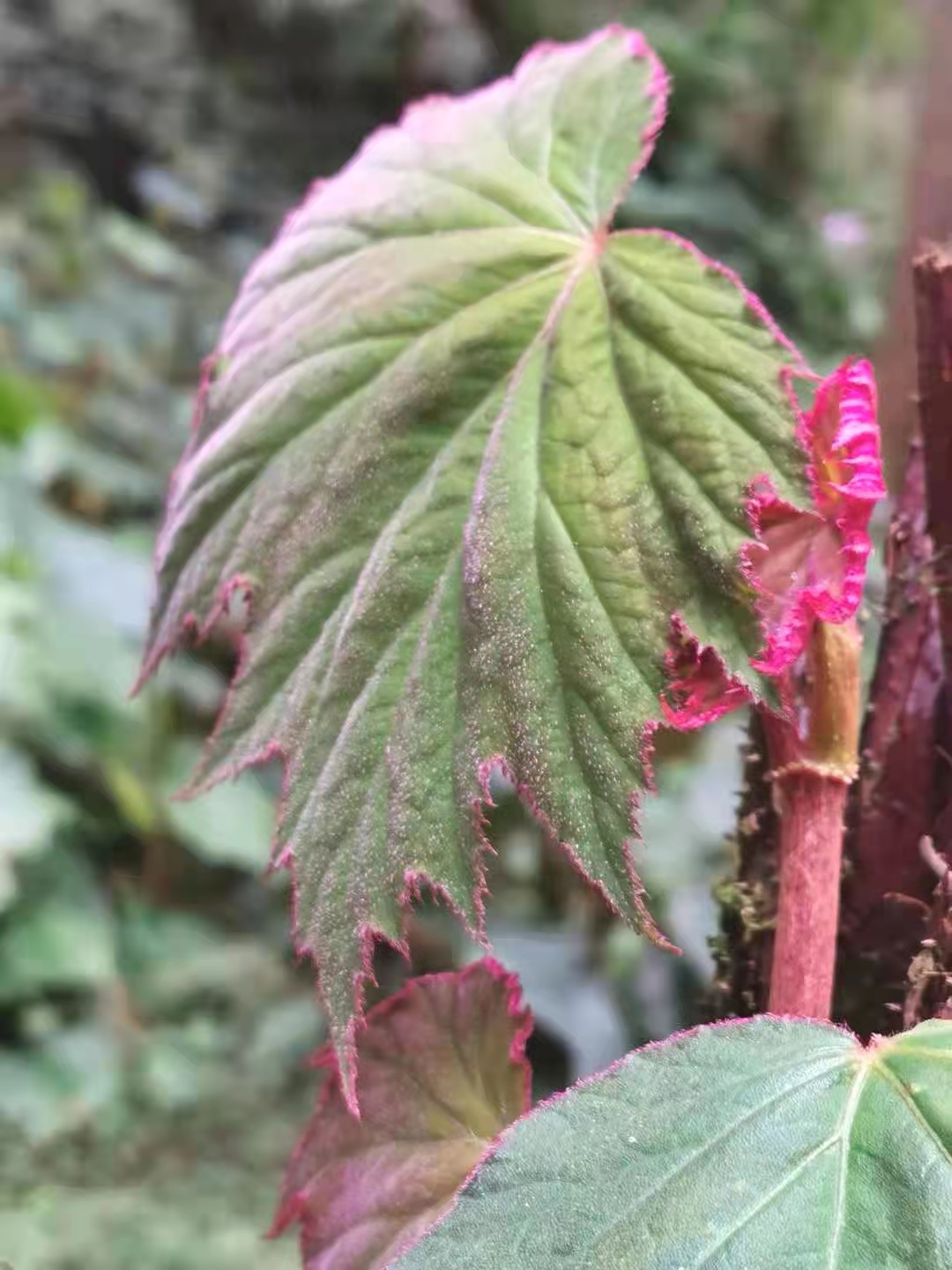
Young tomentose leaf

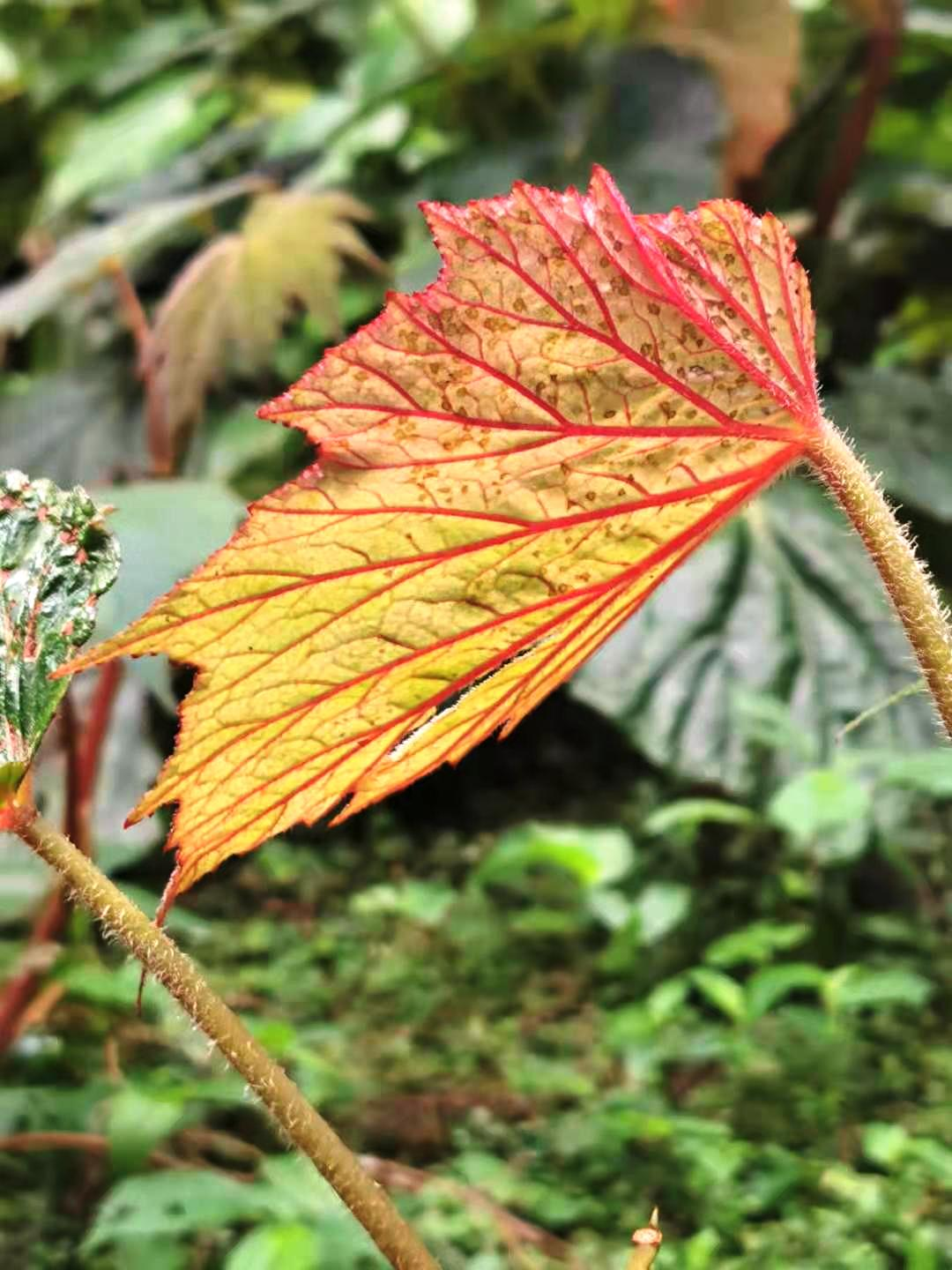
Back of leaf in sunlight

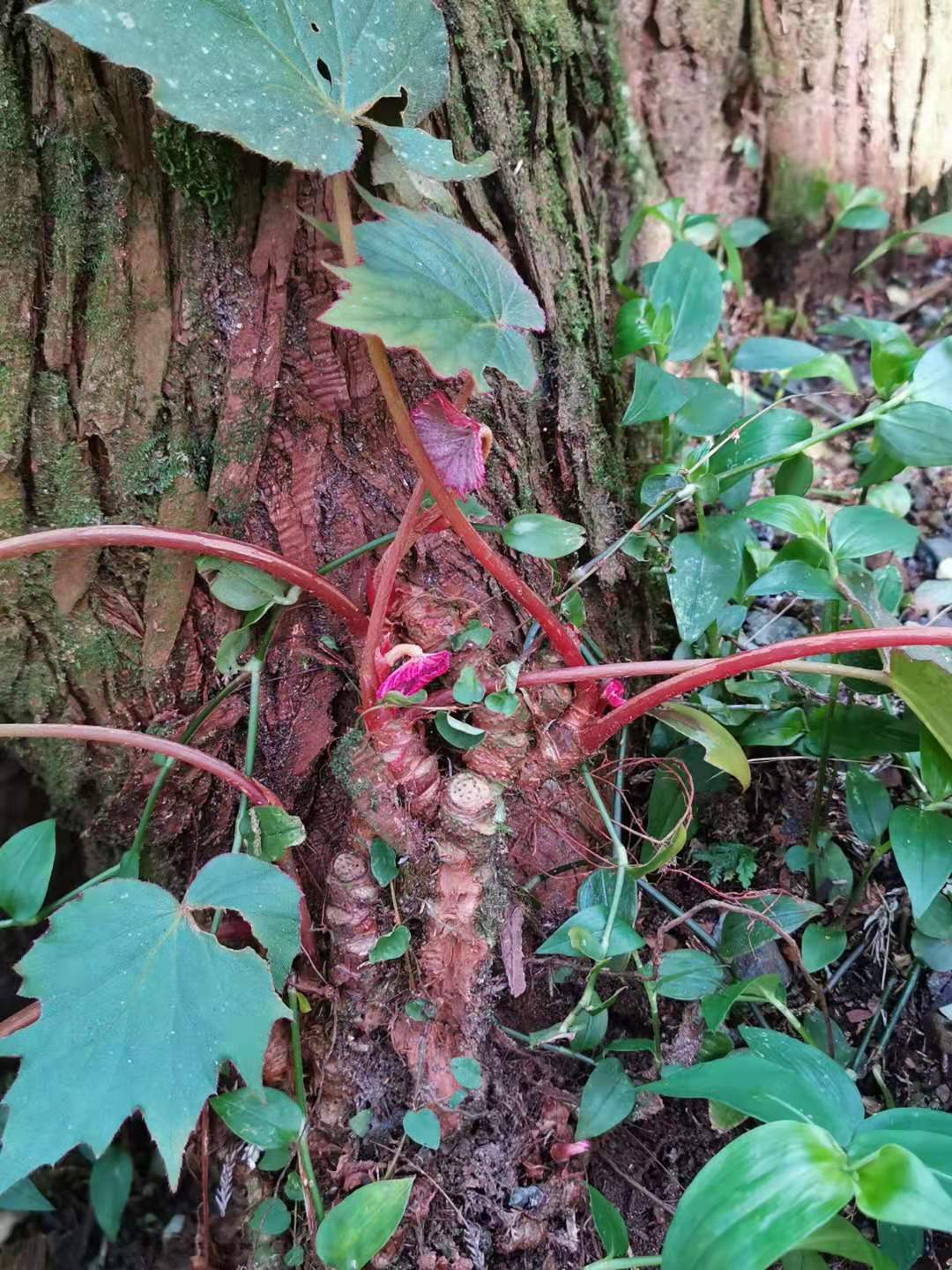
B. palmata has stout rhizomes
