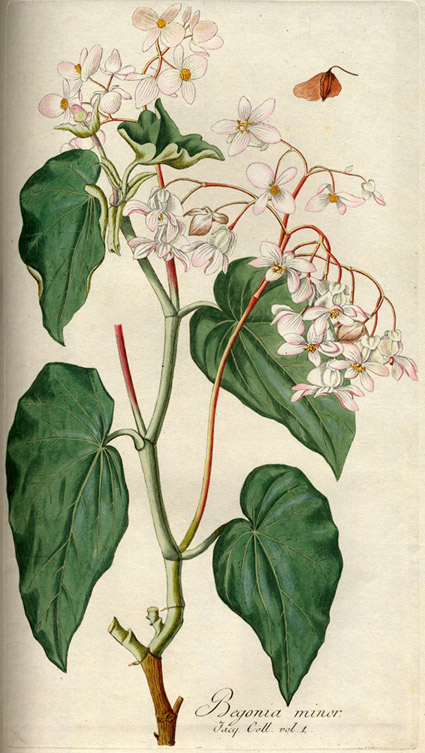
- Botanical illustration of Begonia minor drawn by Nikolaus Joseph von Jacquin for Icones Plantarum Rariorum

Scientific classification
- Kingdom: Plantae
- Clade: Tracheophytes
- Clade: Angiosperms
- Clade: Eudicots
- Clade: Rosids
- Order: Cucurbitales
- Family: Begoniaceae
- Genus: Begonia
- Species: B. minor

Binomial name
- Begonia minor Jacq.

Synonyms
- List: Begonia nitida Aiton; Begonia nitida var. discolor Otto & A.Dietr.; Begonia nitida var. pilosula A.DC.; Begonia nitida var. speciosa Regel; Begonia obliqua L'Hér.; Begonia pulchra A.DC.; Begonia speciosa Bosse; Begonia suaveolens Klotzsch

= Begonia minor =

Species of flowering plant

Begonia minor is a species of flowering plant in the family Begoniaceae, native to Jamaica. It's also been introduced to Madeira, Réunion, and the Society Islands. In 1777, it was the first Begonia to be introduced to Great Britain. Initially, this specimen was known as B. nitida. "Nitida" means "shining leaves".

B. minor has a shrub-like growing habit, and produces masses of pink flowers year-round. When planted in gardens, it can grow to be 3 feet (0.9 m) or more in size.

== Images ==
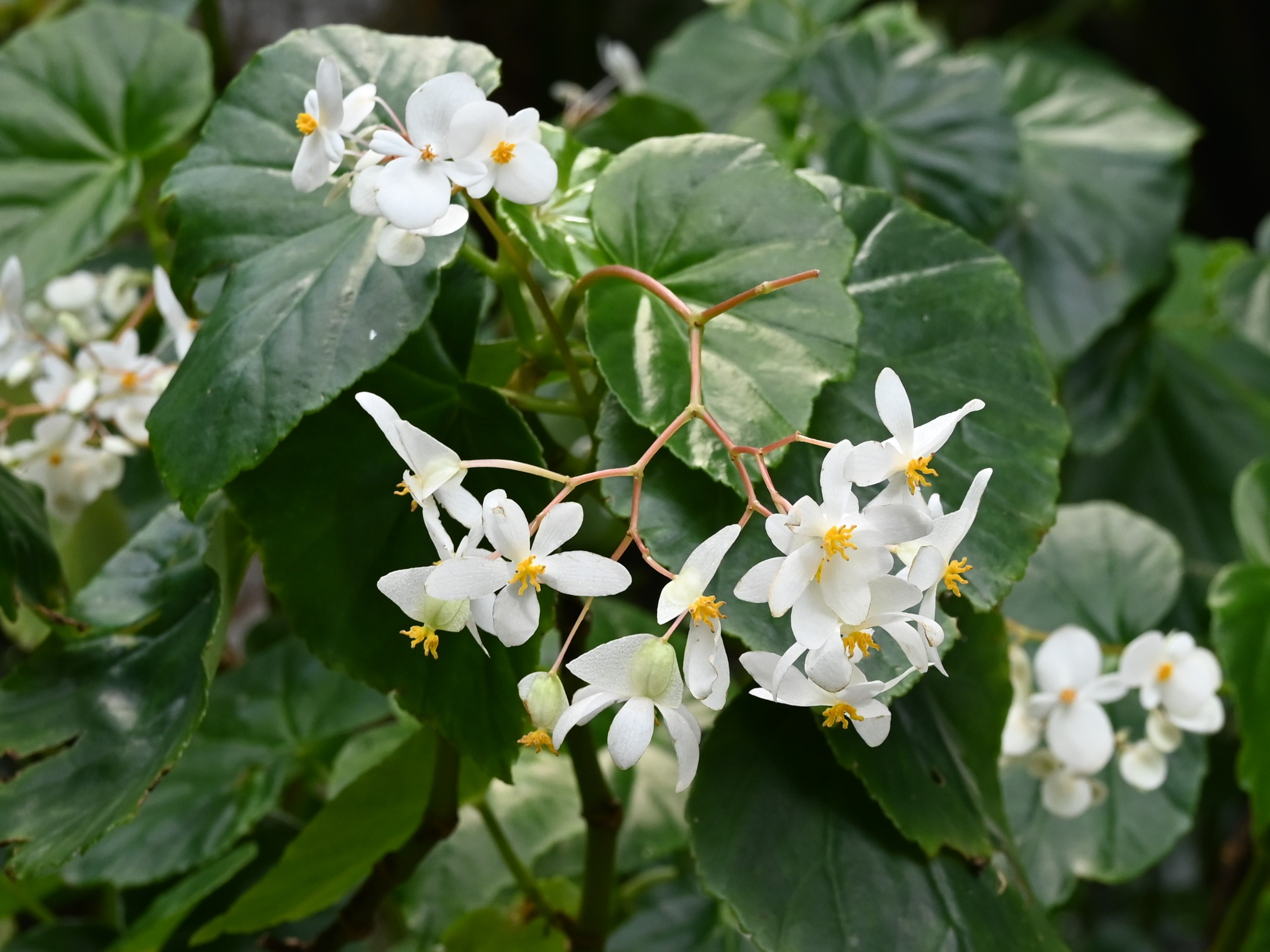

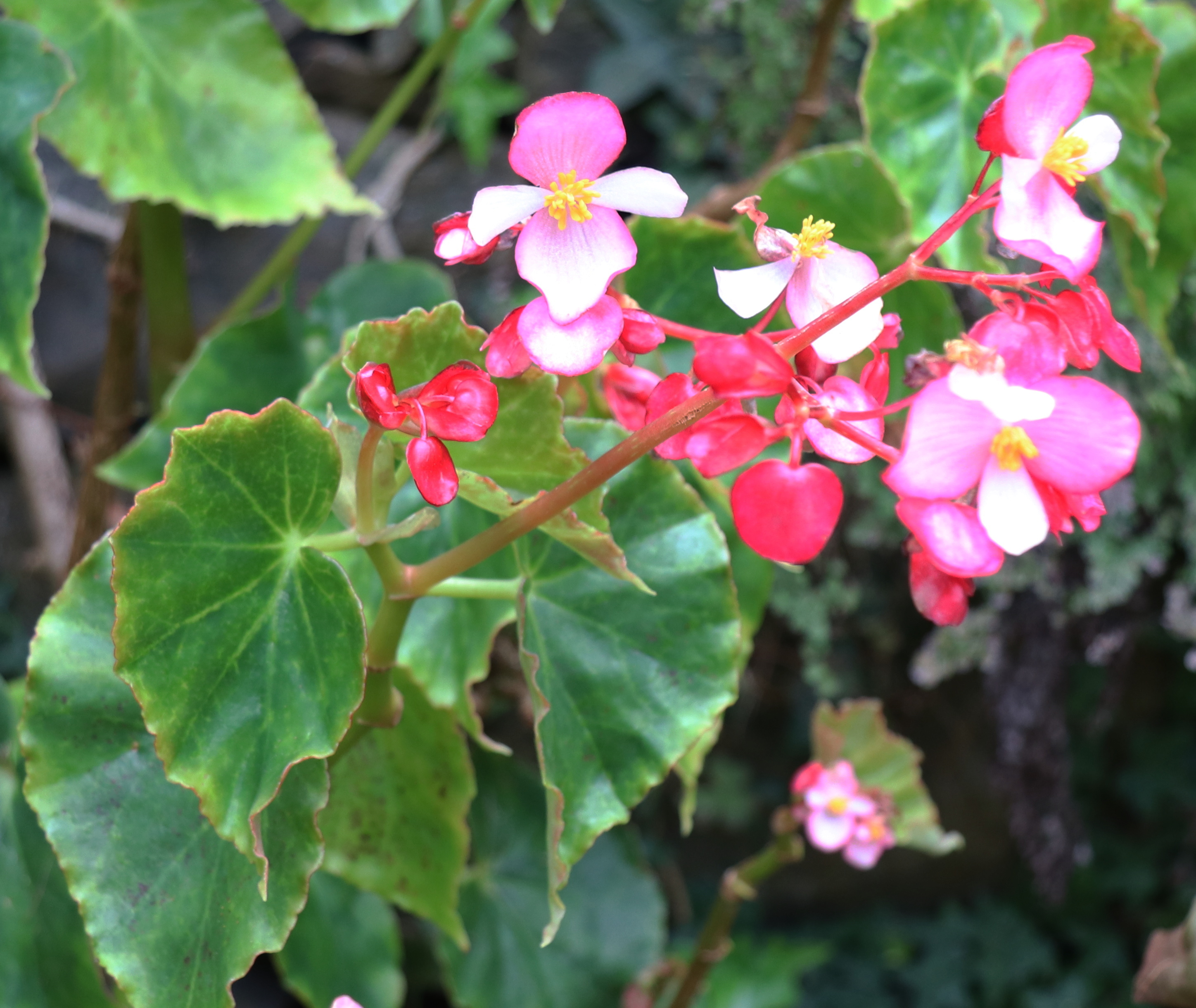

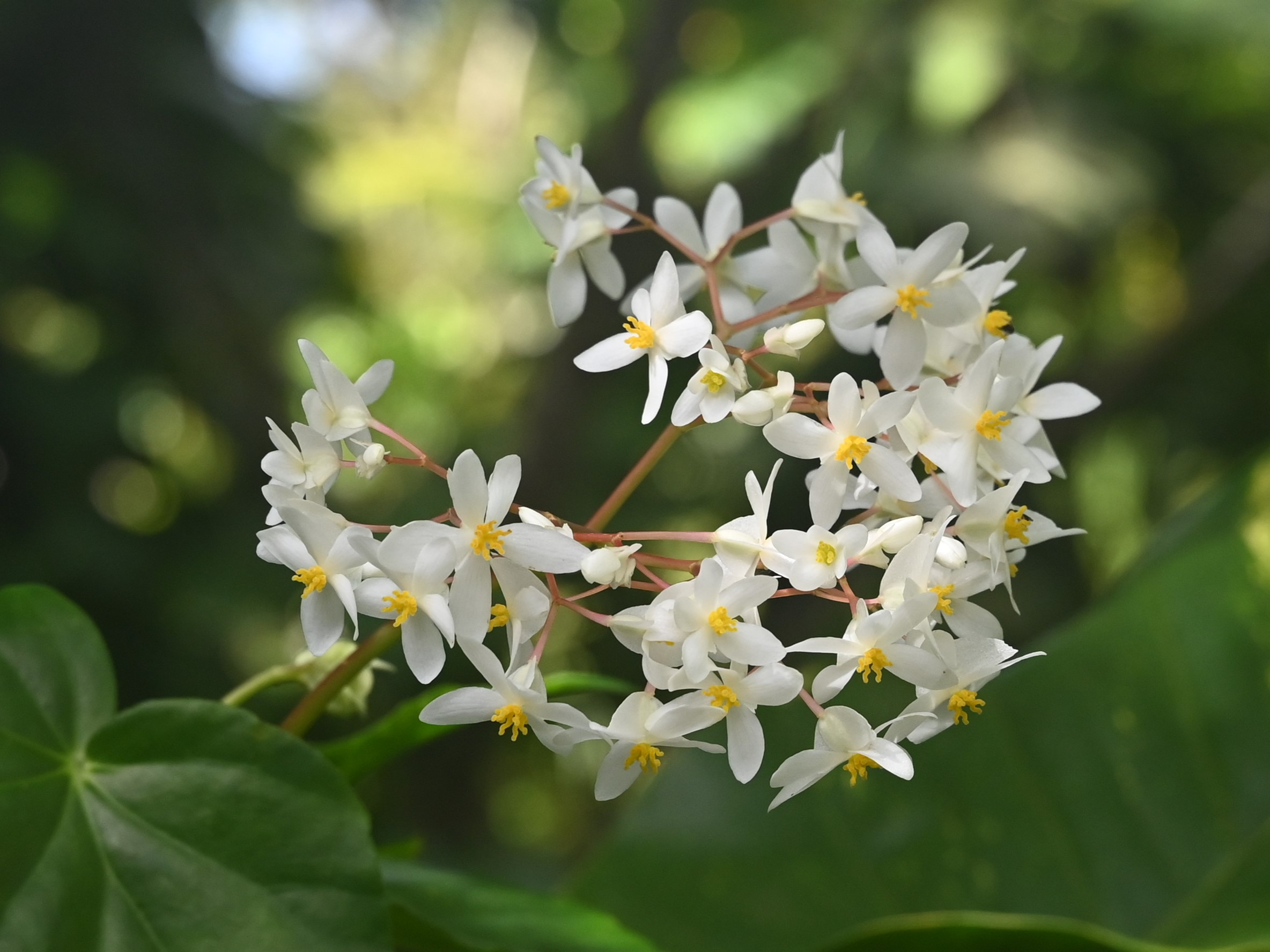

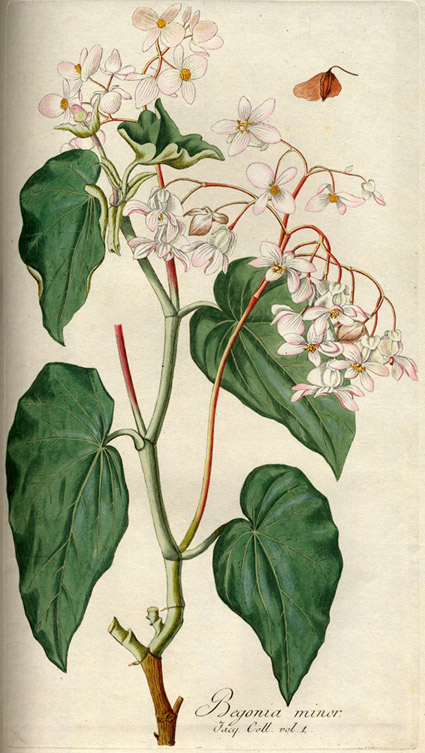

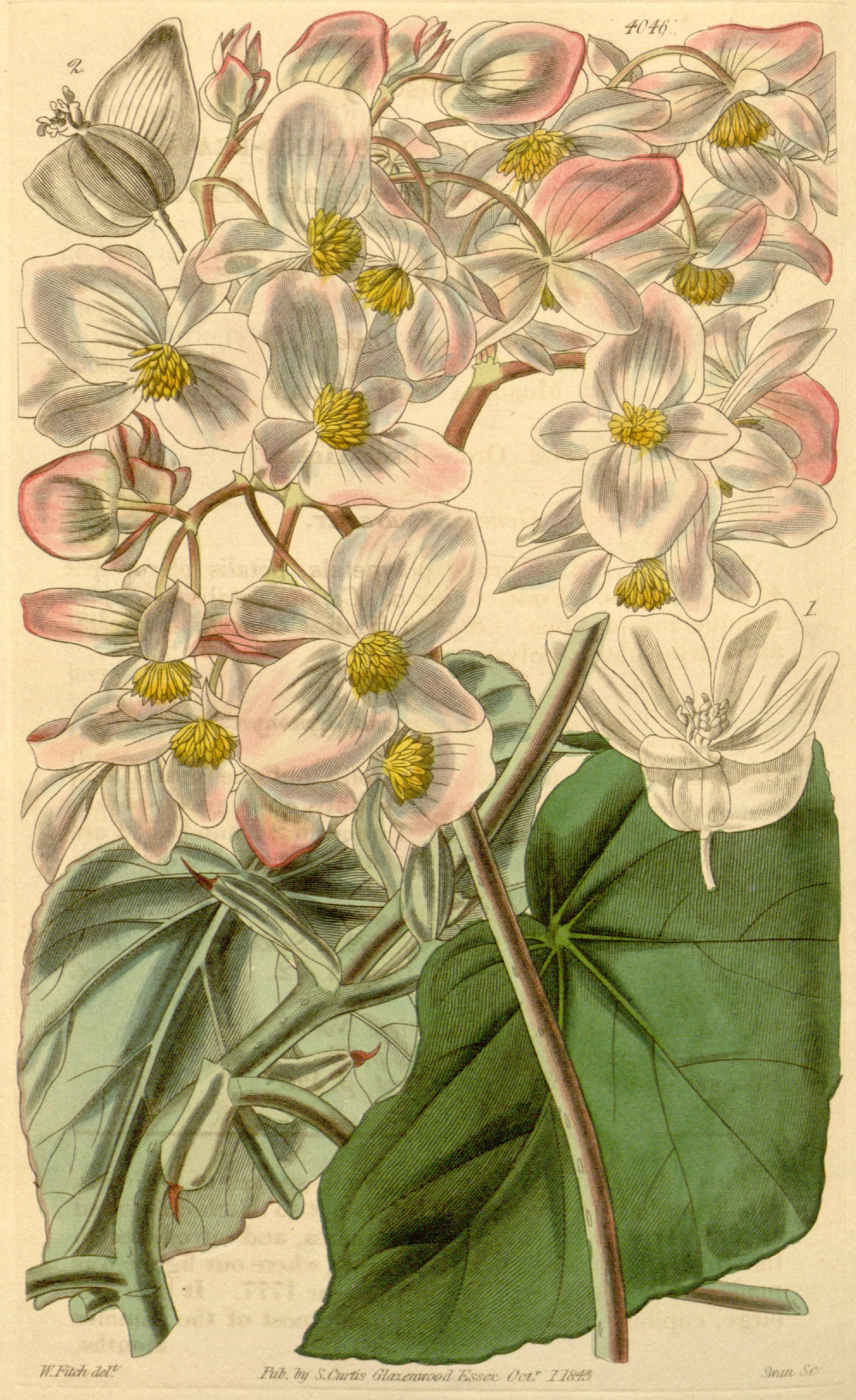

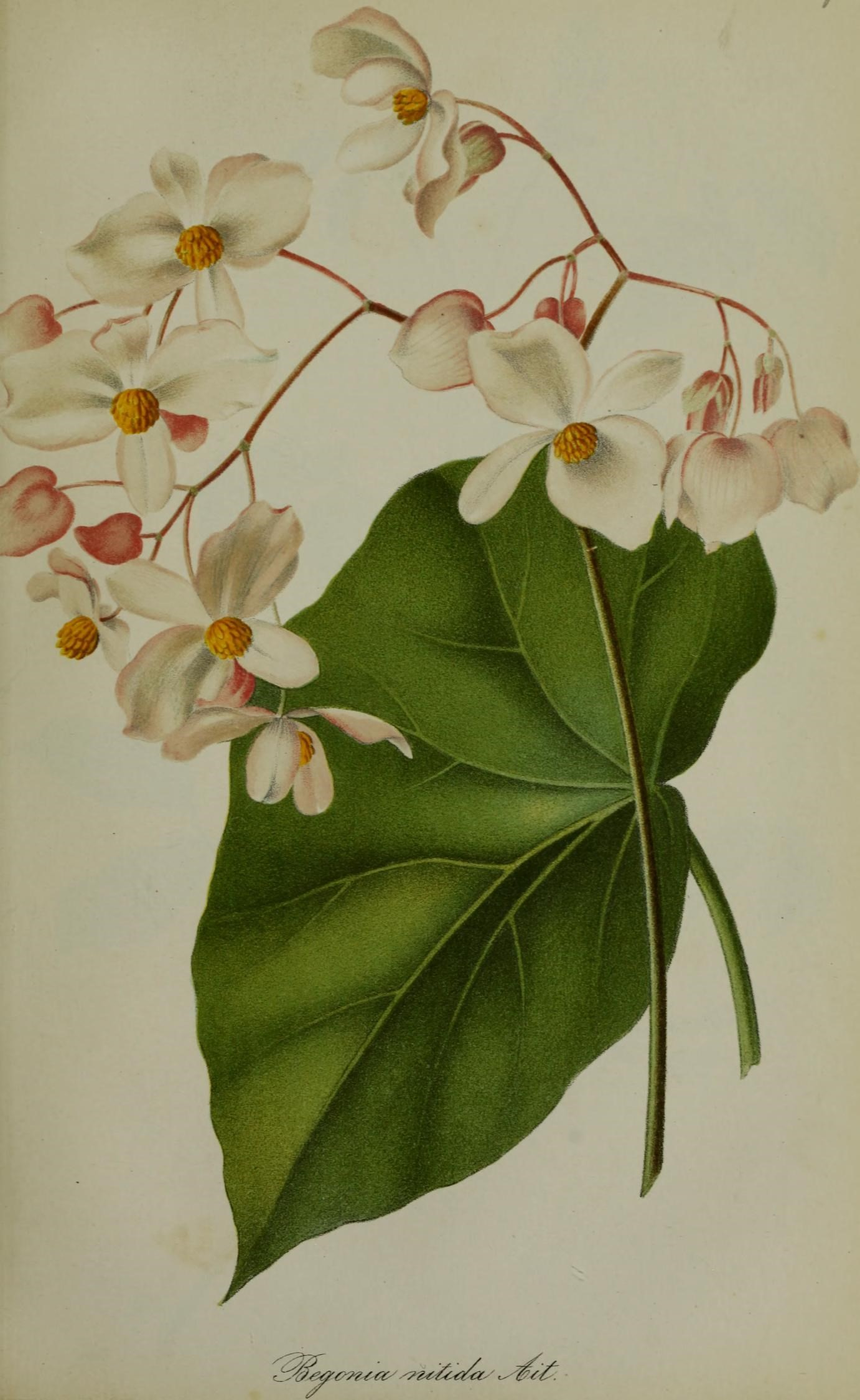

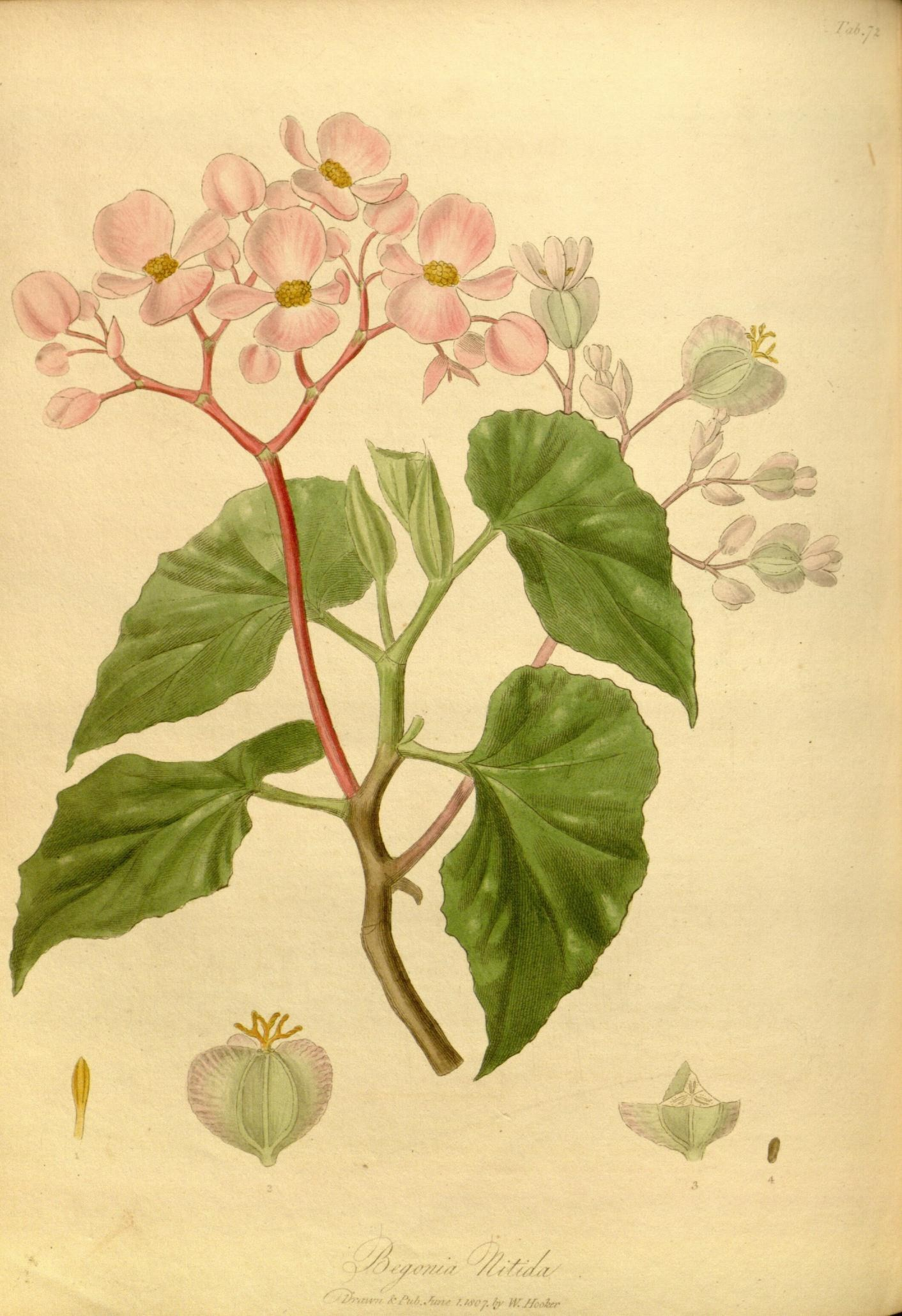
